= List of Space Ghost Coast to Coast episodes =

Space Ghost Coast to Coast is an animated late-night talk show produced by Williams Street for Cartoon Network and later its programming block Adult Swim. It is hosted by washed-up superhero Space Ghost and co-stars his archenemies Zorak and Moltar, who he has imprisoned and enslaved. Zorak is bandleader and Moltar is director and producer. They regularly disrupt the show in contempt of Space Ghost.

Two unaired pilots were created, the first released as a special feature on the Volume Two DVD set. The series premiered on April 15, 1994, and ended on May 31, 2008, with a total of 109 episodes over the course of 10 seasons. The final season was released on GameTap with no involvement from the series' staff outside of voice actors.

== Series overview ==
Series overview
Season	Episodes		Originally released		
Season	Episodes		First released	Last released	Network
Pilots	2		November 16, 2004		N/A
1	10		April 15, 1994	November 11, 1994	Cartoon Network
2	9		February 20, 1995	October 20, 1995	Cartoon Network
3	15		February 2, 1996	December 25, 1996	Cartoon Network
4	24		July 18, 1997	January 1, 1998	Cartoon Network
5	11		August 7, 1998	December 25, 1998	Cartoon Network
6	8		October 8, 1999	December 17, 1999	Cartoon Network
7	8	2	May 7, 2001	July 22, 2001	Cartoon Network
7	8	6	September 2, 2001	May 12, 2002	Adult Swim
8	5		January 1, 2003	December 14, 2003	Adult Swim
9	2		January 11, 2004	April 12, 2004	Adult Swim
10	17		May 30, 2006	May 31, 2008	GameTap
Specials	5		November 4, 1994	March 19, 1996	Cartoon Network

== Episodes ==
=== Pilots (1993–2004) ===
Title	Guest(s)	Original release date
Untitled Pilot 1 "Andy's Pilot"	Denzel Washington	November 16, 2004 (on DVD)
Space Ghost interviews actor Denzel Washington. Notes: This proof of concept test pilot was made in 1993. It features Andy Merrill as Space Ghost and features archived footage of Washington as opposed to an official appearance. It has never aired on television but a heavily edited version can be found as a bonus on the Volume 2 DVD set under the name "Andy's Pilot".
Untitled Pilot 2	Chris Gore & Emma Thompson	Unaired
Space Ghost (voiced by Gary Owens) introduces the show in a "coming soon"-style preview.

=== Season 1 (1994) ===
No. overall	No. in season	Title	Guest(s)	Written by	Original release date
1	1	"Spanish Translation"	The Bee Gees, Kevin Meaney & Susan Powter	Matthew Maiellaro, Andy Merrill, Khaki Jones & Keith Crofford	April 15, 1994
In this series premiere, Space Ghost declares his fondness for Mexican food to Susan Powter. In addition, comedian Kevin Meaney tells Space Ghost about his dislike of tight pants.
2	2	"Gilligan"	Bob Denver, Dawn Wells & Russell Johnson	Matthew Maiellaro, Andy Merrill, Khaki Jones & Keith Crofford	April 22, 1994
Space Ghost interviews the cast of Gilligan's Island and tries to find out if the show is real.
3	3	"Elevator"	Ashley Judd, Timothy Leary & Judy Tenuta	Matthew Maiellaro, Andy Merrill, Khaki Jones & Keith Crofford	May 6, 1994
Space Ghost falls in love with guest Judy Tenuta. Zorak and Moltar try escaping by getting on an elevator.
4	4	"CHiPs"	Bill Carter & Joe Franklin	Matthew Maiellaro, Andy Merrill & Khaki Jones	May 13, 1994
As Space Ghost interviews his guests, Moltar introduces his fascination of the TV series CHiPs while he produces the show.
5	5	"Bobcat"	Bobcat Goldthwait & the Ramones	Matthew Maiellaro, Andy Merrill, Khaki Jones & Keith Crofford	May 27, 1994
Space Ghost's real identity Tad Ghostal is revealed by Zorak during an interview with Bobcat. Bobcat wants to have a party with Space Ghost, and Space Ghost won't let Zorak's favorite band; The Ramones, come because they're "punks", but it turns out Zorak gave them Space Ghost's party cake.
6	6	"Punch"	Kamal Ahmed, Johnny Brennan, Cindy Guyer & Dian Parkinson	Billy Aronson & Matthew Maiellaro	September 16, 1994
Space Ghost, Zorak and Moltar say the word "Punch" a lot.
7	7	"Banjo"	Schoolly D & "Weird Al" Yankovic	Chris Feresten & Matthew Maiellaro	September 23, 1994
Zorak tests out a mind control spell on Space Ghost and the show's guests. Meanwhile, Space Ghost nurtures a special pet, Banjo the sea monkey, which eventually turns into a giant monster that threatens to destroy the studio.
8	8	"Batmantis"	Lee Meriwether, Eartha Kitt & Adam West	Matthew Maiellaro	September 30, 1994
"Your mother" captures Moltar, and says she won't let him free unless Space Ghost gives her his power bands. Meanwhile, Zorak becomes Batmantis and attempts to influence Lee Meriwether. The episode is a spoof of the 60s Batman TV series, and features several of its cast members.
9	9	"Self Help"	Joyce Brothers, Rich Hall & Anka Radakovich	Matthew Maiellaro	October 7, 1994
Hoping to rehabilitate Zorak, Space Ghost welcomes psychiatrist Dr. Joyce Brothers, who ends up being more concerned about him.
10	10	"Gum, Disease"	Danny Bonaduce & Branford Marsalis	Evan Dorkin & Sarah Dyer	November 11, 1994
Moltar is sick during the taping of this episode. Meanwhile, during Space Ghost's interviews with Branford and Danny, Zorak demands gum. Notes: At one point during the episode (specifically after the commercial break), Space Ghost can be clearly seen playing the 1994 video game Sonic & Knuckles.

=== Season 2 (1995) ===
No. overall	No. in season	Title	Guest(s)	Written by	Original release date
11	1	"President's Day Nightmare" "1st Annual World Premiere Toon-In"	Craig McCracken, Pat Ventura, Van Partible, Eugene Mattos, Genndy Tartakovsky, Dian Parkinson	Matthew Maiellaro	February 20, 1995
Space Ghost shows off his versatility by emceeing Cartoon Network's "World Premiere Toon-In". Members of the Council of Doom appear as judges in a beauty pageant-style competition between five cartoon directors. (Simulcast on TNT and TBS)
12	2	"Story Book" "Story Book House"	James Kirkconnell & Carl Clark	Chris Feresten, James Kirkconnell, & Andy Merrill	March 17, 1995
Kirk the Storyteller retells two episodes in a storybook format, with Carl the Cartoonist doing the illustrations.
13	3	"Girlie Show"	Fran Drescher, Carol Channing, Alice Cooper & Russell Johnson	Evan Dorkin, Sarah Dyer	March 24, 1995
Space Ghost does a whole episode dedicated to girls. Zorak gets mad that they didn't have an episode about Jack Klugman.
14	4	"Hungry"	Michael Stipe, Lassie & Mujibur and Sirajul	Spike Feresten & Steve O'Donnell	March 31, 1995
Space Ghost welcomes Michael Stipe from R.E.M. Later, he shares time-honored difficult-places-to-reach-while-scratching-stories with Lassie. Zorak introduces the crew to his young nephew, Raymond, and later eats him when the pizza that the crew ordered fails to arrive on time.
15	5	"Fire Drill"	David Byrne & Donny Osmond	David Greenberger & Matthew Maiellaro	June 2, 1995
Space Ghost makes Academy Award winner David Byrne uncomfortable and attempts to get to the root of the feud between former teen idols Donny Osmond and earlier guest Danny Bonaduce.
16	6	"Le Livre d'Histoire"	Jim Carrey, Chuck Russell, James Kirkconnell & Carl Clark	Matthew Maiellaro, Chris Feresten, James Kirkconnell & Andy Merrill	June 9, 1995
A merger of the episodes "The Mask" and the "Banjo" segment from "Story Book" with the addition of Lokar as guest host.
17	7	"Sleeper"	Hulk Hogan & Slash	Matt Harrigan	July 28, 1995
Space Ghost is concerned about whether Hulk Hogan is getting enough oxygen. Moltar and Zorak improvise guitar solos with their voices.
18	8	"Jerk"	Sandra Bernhard & B. Palmer Mills	Evan Dorkin & Sarah Dyer	August 18, 1995
Space Ghost attempts to create an award-winning show, but his frustration and strict ways make everyone call him a jerk. Introducing Space Ghost's evil twin brother Chad Ghostal.
19	9	"Urges"	Catherine Bach & Matthew Sweet	Nell Scovell & Joel Hodgson	October 20, 1995
It's mating season on Zorak's home planet. Despite the rather unpleasant role the male plays in the mantis love ritual, Zorak gives in to that most common of insect impulses and returns home.

=== Season 3 (1996) ===
No. overall	No. in season	Title	Guest(s)	Written by	Original release date
20	1	"Explode"	Terry Jones & Glen Phillips	Rob Thomas & Alan Laddie	February 2, 1996
Space Ghost talks to Terry Jones and makes many references to the Monty Python series with Zorak. Lokar offers Moltar a job working for him.
21	2	"$20.01"	Joel Hodgson & Penn and Teller	Evan Dorkin & Sarah Dyer	February 9, 1996
Moltar and Zorak are fired when Space Ghost replaces them with MOE 2000 (voiced by executive producer Keith Crofford), an unfeeling computer director. This is a loose parody of 2001: A Space Odyssey.
22	3	"Lovesick"	Carrot Top & Star Lady	Scott Lipe, Matt Harrigan & Alan Laddie	February 14, 1996
Space Ghost is depressed after a recent break up, and Carrot Top tries to cheer him up.
23	4	"Transcript"	Jonathan Richman	Matt Harrigan & Alan Laddie	February 23, 1996
Musician Jonathan Richman favors Space Ghost with a couple of charming songs during a meandering conversation.
24	5	"Sharrock"	Thurston Moore (as "Fred Cracklin")	Michael Cahill, Keith Crofford, Evan Dorkin, Sarah Dyer, Matt Harrigan, Khaki Jones, Mike Lazzo, Matt Maiellaro, Andy Merrill & Dave Willis	March 1, 1996
This episode is dedicated to Sonny Sharrock and showcases his musical work, with a moment of silence at the end.
25	6	"Boo!"	Michael Norman & Bill Nye	Matt Harrigan & Dave Willis	March 8, 1996
Space Ghost turns to experts for advice on supernatural phenomena such as the disappearance of his phantom cruiser keys.
26	7	"Freak Show"	Wylie Gustafson & Bill Manspeaker (of Green Jellÿ)	Andy Merrill	May 22, 1996
An eccentric villain called Commander Andy keeps interrupting the show.
27	8	"Switcheroo"	Susan Olsen & Elvira	Evan Dorkin & Sarah Dyer	June 5, 1996
Space Ghost's evil twin brother Chad Ghostal stops by the show with sinister plans to take over Tad Ghostal's job.
28	9	"Surprise"	Vinnie Dombroski, Jimmie Walker, Mike Watt, Dennis Diken, Pat DiNizio, Juliana Hatfield, Ben Folds, Cameron Diaz, Mark McEwen, Wes Johnson, Dr. Robert Bakker, Matt Talbott, Judy Tenuta, Lori Fetrick, Steve Henneberry, Method Man, Jill Cunniff, Rodney Trevon Oliver, Rev. Norbert St. Louis, Les Claypool, Larry LaLonde & Bobcat Goldthwait	Andy Merrill & Alan Laddie	June 19, 1996
While Space Ghost struggles to make his way to the mail room and pick up a package, The Council of Doom gathers for a surprise birthday party.
29	10	"Glen Campbell"	Matt Groening	Matt Harrigan, Dave Willis & Alan Laddie	October 9, 1996
Moltar puts the show on "automated technical direction" and disappears in accordance with a manual he's reading entitled The Joy of Escape.
30	11	"Jacksonville"	James Hetfield & Kirk Hammett	Andy Merrill & Dave Willis	October 16, 1996
Continuing from the previous episode, Moltar is on the run and suspense dominates this episode. Space Ghost is forced to recruit Tansit as his fill-in director, who causes problems before bringing out the guests.
31	12	"Late Show"	Janeane Garofalo, Dave Grohl, Flip Orley, & John Popper	Spike Feresten & Steve O'Donnell	October 23, 1996
Former Late Show with David Letterman writers scripted this unabashed spoof of late-night talk show convention.
32	13	"Cookout"	Emeril Lagasse, Nathalie Dupree & Martin Yan	Evan Dorkin, Sarah Dyer & Alan Laddie	December 11, 1996
The Council of Doom judge a cooking contest. Zorak wants all the bones.
33	14	"Art Show"	Laurie Anderson & Stomp	Evan Dorkin, Sarah Dyer & Alan Laddie	December 18, 1996
Performance artist Laurie Anderson riles Space Ghost by revealing that she never watches television, then waxes conspiratorial about cyberspace. A disengaged Space Ghost invisos out, missing much of the remaining interview.
34	15	"Woody Allen's Fall Project"	James Kirkconnell	Chip Duffey, Andy Merrill, Matthew Maiellaro, Khaki Jones, Evan Dorkin, Sarah Dyer, Chris Feresten, Steve O'Donnell & Spike Feresten	December 25, 1996
Reenactments of old episodes are done in live-action by various crew members, with introductions by "Space Ghost expert" James Kirkconnell.

=== Season 4 (1997–98) ===
No. overall	No. in season	Title	Guest(s)	Written by	Original release date
35	1	"Rehearsal"	Fred Schneider	Chip Duffey	July 11, 1997
This flashback episode transports viewers to a dress rehearsal two days before the premiere of Space Ghost Coast to Coast on April 15, 1994. Offering a rare glimpse behind the scenes, "Rehearsal" features Space Ghost, Moltar and Zorak flubbing familiar gags, missing cues and mistiming special effects.
36	2	"Gallagher"	Bob Odenkirk & David Cross	Mark Banker, Rich Dahm, Chip Duffey, Ben Karlin, Sean LaFleur, Andy Merrill, Pete Smith & Dave Willis	July 18, 1997
Space Ghost introduces "Space Time Quiz Fun 9000" and his "contestants". What follows is a rapid-fire conversation in more ways than one, as Odenkirk's growing addiction to power-band blasts results in a steady volley from Space Ghost.
37	3	"Edelweiss"	Beck	Dave Willis	July 25, 1997
Zorak is zapped until he can apparently no longer regenerate, leaving Space Ghost without a bandleader. Moltar is instructed to fill in for his dearly departed friend by singing renditions of German folk songs, which puts Beck, the show's lone guest, to sleep. Zorak, who isn't really dead, decides to get back at Space Ghost by "haunting" the set.
38	4	"Anniversary"	Judy Tenuta & Bobcat Goldthwait	Evan Dorkin & Sarah Dyer	August 1, 1997
Space Ghost marks a "special notch in the belt that is the Space Ghost saga".
39	5	"Zoltran"	Robin Leach & Merrill Markoe	Matt Harrigan & Alan Laddie	August 8, 1997
Space Ghost chats with Robin Leach until his guest reveals that he is, in fact, an evil villain named Zoltran.
40	6	"Pilot"	Lori Fetrick & Steve Henneberry	Evan Dorkin & Sarah Dyer	August 15, 1997
Lokar presents the "lost pilot" for the show Birdman Coast to Coast. George Lowe was a singer in the episode, yet his voice was distorted and was not given credit.
41	7	"Speck"	Jimmy Cliff & Jack Logan	Matt Harrigan	August 22, 1997
Moltar and mechanic-turned-musician Jack Logan share a creepy conversation about items underneath their beds. Meanwhile, an irritating speck in Space Ghost's eye stops the show cold, a final calamity on a night of amusing mishaps.
42	8	"Zorak"	Dr. Maxcy Nolan & Steve Arnold	Evan Dorkin & Sarah Dyer	August 29, 1997
An episode dedicated to Zorak.
43	9	"Switcheroo '97"	Bill Mumy & Mark Hamill	Rich Dahm, Ben Karlin, Dan Vebber & Alan Laddie	September 5, 1997
Zorak and Moltar go to a science fiction convention without inviting Space Ghost, prompting him to create Space Ghost Con '97.
44	10	"Mayonnaise"	Jon Stewart	Andy Merrill	September 12, 1997
While attempting to introduce Jon Stewart to the wonders of aroma therapy, Moltar accidentally cuts off his oxygen.
45	11	"Brilliant Number One"	Peter Fonda & Buzz Aldrin	Matthew Maiellaro, Michael Cahill & Alan Laddie	September 19, 1997
Space Ghost pays homage to his real boss by continually referring to Peter Fonda as "Ted Turner's brother-in-law". Rammstein's "Wollt ihr das Bett in Flammen sehen?" is used as the opening theme. Note: An alternate version, entitled "Brilliant Number Two", aired on December 14, 1997.
46	12	"Boo Boo Kitty"	Michael McKean & David Lander	Matthew Maiellaro	September 26, 1997
During Space Ghost's interview with McKean & Lander (or lack thereof), a menacing "kitty" blimp hovers around Ghost Planet.
47	13	"Needledrop"	Ice-T, Ernie C & Fred Willard	Dan Vebber, Sean LaFleur & Alan Laddie	October 3, 1997
Space Ghost decides to do the "hip shake" throughout the show. Meanwhile, Moltar accidentally releases a ghost into the studio, which steals Zorak's soul.
48	14	"Sphinx"	Mike Judge & Harland Williams	Dave Willis	October 10, 1997
Mike Judge kindly asks Space Ghost to "whack the Rugrats". Space Ghost agrees to the job, as long as he can get onto one of Judge's shows.
49	15	"Pavement"	Colin Quinn, Pavement, Steve Smith (as Red Green), Goldie Hawn & Tommy Davidson	Chip Duffey, Andy Merrill, Pete Smith & Dave Willis (credited to "Tad Ghostal")	October 17, 1997
In an episode written by Space Ghost himself, "The Beatles" arrive, and their singing disrupts a Goldie Hawn interview. The Great Gazoo also makes a cameo and Zorak goes to "prison".
50	16	"Untitled"	George Clinton & Erik Estrada	Chip Duffey, Matthew Maiellaro & Alan Laddie	October 24, 1997
Space Ghost, an unofficial member of the P-Funk Mob, sets the groove in motion with George Clinton, but Moltar attempts to wrest the show from Space Ghost's control so he can interview his hero and the star of TV's CHiPs, Erik Estrada.
51	17	"Hipster"	The Millionaire & Sam Butera	Evan Dorkin & Sarah Dyer	October 31, 1997
Space Ghost's evil twin brother Chad Ghostal hosts this episode. George Lowe portrays an audience member, uncredited.
52	18	"Piledriver"	Rob Zombie & Raven-Symoné	Mark Banker, Rich Dahm & Alan Laddie	November 7, 1997
Grandpa Space Ghost (voiced by Randy Savage) stops by the show to visit Tad Ghostal. Note: This episode opens with an archive dubbed segment from the Scooby-Doo, Where Are You! episode "Jeepers, It's the Creeper".
53	19	"Suckup"	John Henson & Bob Goen	Matt Harrigan & Alan Laddie	November 14, 1997
Desperate for a new gig, Space Ghost kisses up to Talk Soup host John Henson and Entertainment Tonight host Bob Goen by telling each that they are "pretty men". Brak however, spoils the whole affair by spilling gravy on the show's set.
54	20	"Dam"	Charlton Heston	Randolph Heard & Alan Laddie	November 21, 1997
This show welcomes its first-ever Academy Award winner, Charlton Heston, who, after much prodding, offers his trophy to Space Ghost.
55	21	"Boat Show"	Steve Allen & Andy Dick	Andy Merrill	December 5, 1997
This episode is a musical special consisting of 11 numbers. Brak joins in as the melodic "Man on the Street".
56	22	"Telethon"	Bob Abdou, Pete Michael & Russ Powell	Evan Dorkin & Sarah Dyer	December 12, 1997
Space Ghost holds a telethon with the Council of Doom because he's out of money, but ends up losing even more money.
57	23	"Dimethyl Pyrimidinol Bisulfite"	Pat Boone & Chuck D	Ben Karlin, Rich Dahm & Alan Laddie	December 19, 1997
Space Ghost and Zorak try to endorse ointment and potted meat to the home viewing audience. Everyone except Space Ghost is severely underwhelmed at the performance of special guest The Rappin' Space Goblin.
58	24	"Joshua"	Tony Bennett, Tom Arnold, Afro-Plane, Kathy Kinney, Ginny, the Dog Who Saves Cats, Paul Gilmartin, Annabelle Gurwitch, John Flansburgh, William, the King of Imagination, Ryah Rosenberg & Sean Medlock	Chip Duffey, Andy Merrill, Pete Smith & Dave Willis	January 1, 1998
A parody of corporate videos with a brief appearance at the end of two winners of a haiku contest. Notes: This is sometimes considered a season 5 episode due to the release year.

=== Season 5 (1998) ===
No. overall	No. in season	Title	Guest(s)	Written by	Original release date
59	1	"Terminal"	Dr. Drew Pinsky & Marc Weiner	Pete Smith & Matt Harrigan	August 7, 1998
Space Ghost fakes a terminal illness so Zorak and Moltar will have sympathy for him.
60	2	"Toast"	Merrill Markoe, Adam Carolla & John Henson	Matt Harrigan, Pete Smith & Dave Willis	August 14, 1998
After Space Ghost declares his love for Merrill Markoe, he receives advice from Adam Carolla, co-host of MTV's Loveline.
61	3	"Lawsuit"	Greta Van Susteren	Evan Dorkin & Sarah Dyer	August 21, 1998
Space Ghost gets sued by his old sidekicks Jan and Jace. Their lawyer is Space Ghost's arch enemy Dr. Nightmare, Attorney at Law.
62	4	"Cahill"	Garrett Morris & Mark McEwen	Ben Karlin & Brian Posehn	August 28, 1998
A vicious storm on Ghost Planet has Space Ghost scared silly.
63	5	"Warren"	Gary Owens & Col. Bruce Hampton (as Warren)	Matt Maeillaro	September 4, 1998
Space Ghost grows angry upon learning that he has been 'imposternated' on a bizarre, intergalactic television program. Notes: The premiere airing was an extended edit in which the same events played out three times in a row, running for 35 minutes without commercial breaks. The shorter, 12 minute version was first aired on September 6, 1998. The longer version was later released on "The 1998 Episodes" DVD.
64	6	"Chinatown"	Tyra Banks & Rebecca Romijn	Dave Willis	September 11, 1998
Space Ghost trades Moltar to a Chinese baseball team and replaces him with a dog. Zorak loses his edge without Moltar.
65	7	"Rio Ghosto"	Ben Stiller, Kevin Smith, & Jim Jarmusch	Mark Banker	September 18, 1998
Space Ghost pursues a movie career.
66	8	"Pal Joey"	Michael Moore	Pete Smith	September 25, 1998
Joey, an overzealous ex-intern, annoys Space Ghost with his antics.
67	9	"Curses"	Moby, Emo Philips, Shirley Manson, & James Kirkconnell	Pete Smith	November 6, 1998
Space Ghost is afflicted by the Curse of Kintavé and is driven to eat all of his guests.
68	10	"Intense Patriotism"	Jeff Foxworthy	Dave Willis	December 4, 1998
Space Ghost attempts to take Ghost Planet to the United States, and consequently focuses the show on various aspects of America.
69	11	"Waiting for Edward"	Denis Leary	Matt Harrigan, Matthew Maiellaro, Pete Smith & Dave Willis	December 25, 1998
While Space Ghost interviews Denis Leary, Moltar destroys Ghost Planet and Space Ghost subsequently appears at a day camp, explaining how he saved Christmas.

=== Season 6 (1999) ===
No. overall	No. in season	Title	Guest(s)	Written by	Original release date
70	1	"Chambraigne"	Bob Costas & Al Roker (TV version)	Matt Maiellaro, Dave Willis, Jim Fortier & Pete Smith	October 8, 1999
Space Ghost tries the product "Chambraigne", a shampoo that supposedly enhances intelligence. After watching the show, the inventors of Chambraigne rush to Ghost Planet to try and stop Space Ghost from endorsing their fake product before his idiocy exposes their scam. Notes: This episode was first released on DVD as a bonus feature on Aqua Teen Hunger Force Volume Five and later on "From the Kentucky Nightmare DVD". The commercial at the beginning was edited for both releases, with Al Roker replaced by George "Al" Lowe. Carl and his son later returned in the Aqua Teen Hunger Force episode "Carl Wash", also available on the Aqua Teen Hunger Force Volume Five.
71	2	"Snatch"	Steven Wright	N/A	October 15, 1999
The comedy stakes are high when Space Ghost, Moltar, Zorak and guest Steven Wright are sealed inside the studio by a giant blob and stalked by body-snatching alien pods. Notes: This episode premiered with an ending featuring a Colonial Man (played by Dave Willis) telling viewers to bid for the ending on eBay. It was later re-aired on January 28, 2000 without this closing message. The Colonial Man ending was later included as a bonus on "From the Kentucky Nightmare DVD". An aborted attempt to use the Steven Wright interview, entitled "Dinner with Steven", was released on "The 1998 Episodes" DVD as a "bonus value episode".
72	3	"Girl Hair"	Hanson	Matt Harrigan, Matt Maiellaro, Pete Smith & Dave Willis	October 22, 1999
Members of Hanson have long hair and Space Ghost is obsessed with combing it. This episode reveals Space Ghost's dark side as well as Zorak's desire to procure teeth so that he can get into clubs. Appearances by the Tooth Fairy and Bizarro Santa Claus bring about one of the weirdest scenes yet staged on the show.
73	4	"Sequel"	Captain & Tennille	Evan Dorkin & Sarah Dyer	October 29, 1999
After Space Ghost has been sent to the slammer for years of mistreating Jan and Jace, Birdman is called upon to guest host the show, but spends most of his time lamenting an impending divorce from his wife Galaxy Girl, a.k.a. Sylvia.
74	5	"Curling Flower Space"	Jerry Springer & Sarah Jessica Parker	Matt Maiellaro, Jim Fortier & Dave Willis	November 19, 1999
Jerry Springer and Sarah Jessica Parker nearly get trampled in this bizarre romp through the minds of Space Ghost, Moltar and Zorak.
75	6	"Table Read"	N/A	Dave Willis, Jim Fortier, Matt Maiellaro & Mark Banker	December 3, 1999
The show's voice actors and writers, consisting of George Lowe, C. Martin Croker, Jim Fortier, Dave Willis, Matt Maiellaro, Mike Lazzo and Mark Banker, rehearse (in live-action) the episode "Fire Ant".
76	7	"Fire Ant"	Conan O'Brien	Dave Willis, Matt Maiellaro, Jim Fortier & Mark Banker	December 10, 1999
Space Ghost spontaneously combusts during his interview with fellow talk show host Conan O'Brien. Later, after vaporizing an ant that bit him, Space Ghost finds another ant in the studio, and vows to follow it home and kill its whole family. Notes: Two versions of this episode exist, with approximate lengths of 11 and 22 minutes. In the extended episode, a more than 10-minute version of Space Ghost's pursuit of the fire ant across various backdrops is shown, eventually reaching the standard episode's conclusion. This version is currently available on the Adult Swim app.
77	8	"King Dead"	Jon Benjamin	Dave Willis, Matt Maiellaro, Pete Smith, Jim Fortier & Mark Banker	December 17, 1999
Space Ghost fires Zorak and Moltar and replaces them with Brak and Tansit, but quickly realizes they are poor substitutes. Meanwhile, after breaking into Space Ghost's apartment, Zorak and Moltar decide to derail the show by abducting the guest star Jon Benjamin and holding him for ransom.

=== Season 7 (2001–02) ===
The series moved to Adult Swim on September 2, 2001, with the premiere of "Knifin' Around". Another episode featuring Merrill Markoe titled "Drop Out" was planned for this run of episodes but was never produced. The series' revival run is the first season of the show after Hanna-Barbera was absorbed into Warner Bros. Animation on March 12, 2001, and William Hanna's death of throat cancer on March 22, 2001.

No. overall	No. in season	Title	Guest(s)	Written by	Original release date
78	1	"Kentucky Nightmare"	Willie Nelson	Matt Maiellaro & Dave Willis	May 7, 2001 (on Cartoon Network)
Space Ghost signs an endorsement deal with a liquor store chain, and he is forced to use a shark as the show's new mascot. A bear wanders onto the set, upsetting the normal routine by repeatedly attacking Space Ghost. After remembering a comment Bobcat Goldthwait had made during his interview several years earlier, Space Ghost cracks open all the windows in the studio, which later allows the building to be overrun by giant killer bees that the shark attracted by spontaneously combusting.
79	2	"The Justice Hole"	Dave Thomas	Matt Maiellaro & Dave Willis	July 22, 2001 (on Cartoon Network)
An agitated Space Ghost leaves his own show, but can't find anything to do. When he tries joining a team of third-rate superheroes based in a hole in the ground outside the Justice League's headquarters, he finds that even the reject heroes don't like him.
80	3	"Knifin' Around"	Björk & Thom Yorke	Matt Maiellaro & Dave Willis	September 2, 2001
Space Ghost has Moltar sub in as the show's host to keep Thom Yorke distracted while he illegally copies the new Radiohead album. Meanwhile, Space Ghost discovers he is married to Björk, but hates being a husband, especially to someone so eccentric.
81	4	"Flipmode"	Busta Rhymes	Matt Maiellaro & Dave Willis	October 14, 2001
Space Ghost is hosting a "mystery dinner theater" and in the midst, he beats Zorak senseless a number of times and causes a massive gas leak, which causes everyone to hallucinate.
82	5	"Sweet for Brak"	Tenacious D (Jack Black & Kyle Gass)	Matt Maiellaro & Dave Willis	November 18, 2001
Space Ghost becomes jealous when Brak's spin-off, The Brak Show, becomes a hit. Meanwhile, Zorak teaches the band Tenacious D how to perform.
83	6	"Mommentary"	Willie Nelson	Matt Maiellaro & Dave Willis	December 2, 2001
Special edition of "Kentucky Nightmare" with commentary provided by the show producers' mothers: Harriet Lazzo, Rachel Maiellaro and Sharon Willis.
84	7	"Mommentary: Creator's Commentary"	Willie Nelson	Matt Maiellaro & Dave Willis	May 12, 2002
Special edition of "Mommentary" with commentary on previous commentary by Mike Lazzo, Matt Maiellaro and Dave Willis.
85	8	"Mommentary: Jelly Bean"	Willie Nelson	Matt Maiellaro & Dave Willis	May 12, 2002
Special edition of "Mommentary" with new commentary from the show's producers Mike Lazzo, Matt Maiellaro and Dave Willis.

=== Season 8 (2003) ===
Two other episodes were planned for this season but scrapped. One entitled "One Way Out" would have featured Seth Green, while the other, untitled episode would have featured Seth MacFarlane.

No. overall	No. in season	Title	Guest(s)	Written by	Original release date
86	1	"Baffler Meal"	Willie Nelson	Matt Maiellaro, Dave Willis & Todd Hanson	January 1, 2003
Space Ghost sells the show out to a fast food restaurant named Burger Trench, but the restaurant's overzealous mascots, the Aqua Teen Hunger Force (Master Shake, Frylock and Meatwad), continually disrupt the show with their relentless promotion of Burger Trench's food. Notes: This episode was originally meant to serve as a backdoor pilot for Aqua Teen Hunger Force. It was originally written in 1999 but was initially rejected because of the heavy emphasis on the Aqua Teen Hunger Force characters. who appear here in their prototype designs with Shake and Frylock's different voices. It was later produced years after Aqua Teen Hunger Force premiered in late 2000. The episode is included as a bonus on Aqua Teen Hunger Force Volume 2 along with a deleted opening sequence and commentary.
87	2	"Whipping Post"	Dennis Miller	Matt Harrigan; Contributing Writers: Jim Fortier, Matt Maiellaro, Pete Smith & Dave Willis	November 23, 2003
Space Ghost is angry about a variety of topics, and rants mightily to his guest, comedian Dennis Miller.
88	3	"Eat a Peach"	Todd Barry	Matt Harrigan; Contributing Writers: Jim Fortier, Matt Maiellaro, Pete Smith & Dave Willis	November 30, 2003
Moltar and Zorak compete for Space Ghost's attention, while Space Ghost is more concerned with the safety of comedian Todd Barry's automobile.
89	4	"In Memory of Elizabeth Reed"	William Shatner	Matt Harrigan; Contributing Writers: Jim Fortier, Matt Maiellaro, Pete Smith & Dave Willis	December 7, 2003
Space Ghost's interview with William Shatner is cut short when he is called into action to take part in an epic battle with the HVAC repairmen working on Zorak's air conditioner. In Space Ghost's absence, Moltar attempts to share some of his Star Trek fanfiction with Shatner.
90	5	"Idlewild South"	Jeff Probst	Matt Harrigan; Contributing Writers: Jim Fortier, Matt Maiellaro, Pete Smith & Dave Willis	December 14, 2003
Space Ghost becomes incredibly drunk after Moltar convinces him that tallboys (16oz beers) will make him "feel like a cowboy", and his inebriated antics quickly derail his interview with Survivor host Jeff Probst.

=== Season 9 (2004) ===
This is the last season of the show that would be aired on Adult Swim before being moved to the video section of GameTap for one more season before its cancellation.

No. overall	No. in season	Title	Guest(s)	Written by	Original release date
91	1	"Dreams"	Triumph the Insult Comic Dog	Matt Harrigan; Contributing Writers: Jim Fortier, Matt Maiellaro, Pete Smith & Dave Willis	January 11, 2004
Space Ghost hosts a telethon to raise money for "retardos" and enlists Triumph's help.
92	2	"Live at the Fillmore" "Unfinished POS"	None	Matt Harrigan	April 12, 2004
The show's budget is used to bail Space Ghost out of jail. Afterwards, he, Zorak, and Moltar try to find ways to run the show without that money, but things take a bizarre turn for the worse. Notes: This episode was left unfinished and was promoted as an "Unfinished POS". The credits for "Kentucky Nightmare" appear at the end.

=== Season 10 (2006–08) ===
No. overall	No. in season	Title	Guest(s)	Original release date
93	1	"Billy"	Billy Mitchell	May 30, 2006
Space Ghost interviews Billy Mitchell.
94	2	"Rand"	Rand Miller	June 13, 2006
Space Ghost discusses Myst with Rand Miller.
95	3	"Kenny"	Kenny Wayne Shepherd	July 4, 2006
Space Ghost seeks style advice from Kenny Wayne Shepherd.
96	4	"Al"	Allan Alcorn as "Mr. Pong"	October 10, 2006
Zorak is reunited with Mr. Pong, his father.
97	5	"Steve"	Steve Wozniak	January 23, 2007
Zorak shops for a "brain cannon".
98	6	"Rob"	Rob Fulop	February 28, 2007
Space Ghost seeks answers after his cat, Marty, dies.
99	7	"Howard"	Howard Warshaw	March 17, 2007
Zorak's old nemesis, Yarr, returns after 20 years.
100	8	"Wayne"	Wayne Coyne	April 21, 2007
Space Ghost appoints Moltar as the staff cook.
101	9	"Larry"	Larry Hunter	May 24, 2007
Space Ghost interviews Larry Hunter.
102	10	"Richard"	Richard Garriott	September 11, 2007
Space Ghost and Zorak talk to Moltar about his marriage.
103	11	"Stephen"	Stephen Bristow	October 31, 2007
Zorak and Moltar torment Space Ghost, after over hearing him discuss his nightmare with Yarr.
104	12	"David"	David Crane	November 11, 2007
Zorak takes over the show when Space Ghost goes searching for Moltar.
105	13	"Chantal"	Chantal Claret	December 2, 2007
Space Ghost discusses Morningwood with Chantal Claret.
106	14	"Mark"	Mark Thompson	May 4, 2008
Space Ghost interviews Mark Thompson.
107	15	"Bruce"	Bruce Stern	May 16, 2008
Space Ghost interviews Bruce Stern.
108	16	"Dee"	Dee Snider	May 25, 2008
Space Ghost brags about winning a "Golden Throaty" award.
109	17	"Barenaked Ladies"	Barenaked Ladies	May 31, 2008
Space Ghost attempts to spice up the show to boost ratings by showing Barenaked Ladies, but gets confused when they are not literally bare-naked ladies. He gets the show canceled by repeatedly showing his nipple to increase the show's female audience.

=== Specials ===
Title	Guest(s)	Written by	Original release date
"The Mask"	Jim Carrey & Chuck Russell	Matthew Maiellaro	November 4, 1994
A promotional special released exclusively on the VHS release of The Mask, featuring interviews with the film's star and director. Later shown as a part of the "Le Livre d'Histoire" episode on June 9, 1995.
"A Space Ghost Christmas"	Kevin Meaney	Matthew Maiellaro	December 25, 1994
A special Christmas episode featuring musical segments with the main cast and the Council of Doom. Notes: Aired in the form of a marathon with its separate segments and songs surrounding older episodes. It originally premiered with "Bobcat", "Batmantis" and "Gum, Disease" shown in-between.
"Space Ghost Syndication Exclusive Special"	N/A	Matt Harrigan	November 12, 1995
Space Ghost waits for a large cash payment from the "syndication weasels" so he can perform some all-new material. Notes: This was a one-hour special that aired in broadcast syndication; "Batmantis", "Bobcat" and "Jerk" were shown in between its separate segments.
"Dark Side of the Ghost Planet Planetarium Tour"	Thurston Moore	Matthew Maiellaro	February 9, 1996
In early 1996, there was a planetarium tour that Cartoon Network and Turner produced. The event included the Space Ghost Coast to Coast episodes "$20.01", "Transcript" and "Explode", along with music videos and old 1960s Space Ghost episodes. The event was hosted by Space Ghost, Zorak and Moltar. Thurston Moore made an appearance, from footage of Moore that would later be seen in the episode "Sharrock". This episode/special, with the episodes and music videos edited out, can now be found on YouTube.
"Jonny Quest"	Jonny Quest	Matthew Maiellaro	March 19, 1996
Created as a trailer as well as an interview of sorts for Turner Home Entertainment's VHS releases of Classic Jonny Quest. Also included commercial clips.

== See also ==
- List of Space Ghost Coast to Coast characters
