= Brak Presents the Brak Show Starring Brak =

2000 animated television special

- Title card
- Genre: Comedy; Musical show; Slapstick
- Based on: Brak by Hanna-Barbera
- Written by: Pete Smith; Matt Maiellaro; Anne Susan Brown; Jim Fortier
- Voices of: Andy Merrill; C. Martin Croker
- Composer: Eddie Horst
- Country of origin: United States
- Original language: English
- No. of episodes: 2

Production
- Executive producers: Mike Lazzo; Keith Crofford
- Producer: Jim Fortier
- Running time: 22–23 minutes approx.
- Production company: Williams Street

Original release
- Network: Cartoon Network
- Release: February 20, 2000

Brak Presents the Brak Show Starring Brak is a two-part live-action/animated musical comedy television special produced by Williams Street for Cartoon Network which aired on February 20, 2000. It is a spin-off of Space Ghost Coast to Coast and serves as a predecessor to The Brak Show, which would air the following year on the network's nighttime programming block Adult Swim.

== History ==
On July 2, 1999, at the Cartoon Network panel at Dragon Con in Atlanta, Georgia, Andy Merrill, C. Martin Croker, Pete Smith and Nina Bishop announced they were developing a new series starring Brak.

== Plot ==
Brak is the host of a musical variety show while Zorak is trying to sabotage it. The show features celebrity appearances by Monica, Freddie Prinze Jr., The Chieftains, Diamond Dallas Page, and Jo Dee Messina. Grape Ape and Wally Gator make an appearance as well.

== Soundtrack ==
Brak Presents the Brak Album Starring Brak

Soundtrack album by Brak
- Released: March 14, 2000
- Length: 39:50
- Label: Kid Rhino

Brak chronology
Space Ghost's Surf & Turf (1998)	Brak Presents the Brak Album Starring Brak (2000)

Professional ratings
Review scores
Source	Rating
Allmusic	link

In 2000, the soundtrack Brak Presents the Brak Album Starring Brak was released. The 30 tracks are taken in order from the two "Brak Presents the Brak Show Starring Brak" specials, with the exception of the three bonus tracks and a re-recording of "We're Buds" which was originally a duet between Brak and Jo Dee Messina, but appears on the album with Brak singing both parts.

=== Track listing ===
1. "Really Cool Song" (Brak, Wally Gator, Zorak & The Brakettes) 1:19
2. "Franz Shoebert" (Franz Shoebert & The Brakettes) :46
3. "Dentist" (Wally Gator, Brak & Zorak) 1:18
4. "Magic Toenail" (Brak) 1:25
5. "Babbling Brook" (Brak, Brook & The Chieftains) :38
6. "I'll Tell Me Ma" (Brak & The Chieftains) 2:10
7. "Rock Candy" (Zorak) :56
8. "Big Fat Squid" (Grape Ape & The Brakettes) 1:01
9. "I Like Hubcaps" (Brak, Franz Shoebert & The Brakettes) 1:52
10. "Cowboy Buddy" (Cowboy Buddy) :35
11. "Highway 40" (Brak & Freddie Prinze, Jr.) 2:17
12. "Bananachek" (Brak, Allen Wrench & The Brakettes) 1:10
13. "Smell You Later" (Zorak, Fuzzy & The Brakettes) 1:27
14. "Store" (Brak & The Brakettes) 1:08
15. "Brak Counterbrak" (Brak) :54
16. "Evil Is Only Skin Deep" (Diamond Dallas Page, Zorak & The Brakettes) 1:35
17. "We Like Girls" (Brak, Zorak & The Brakettes) 1:20
18. "El Brakiachi" (Brak, Zorak & The Brakettes) 1:17
19. "Beeflog" (Brak & Zorak) 1:02
20. "Another Cowboy Buddy" (Cowboy Buddy) :38
21. "Barbeque" (Brak & Zorak) :51
22. "Count Brakula" (Brak & Zorak) 1:14
23. "I'm Forgettable" (Brak) 1:19
24. "News Bulletin" (Brak) :24
25. "I'm a Cucumber" (Brak) :21
26. "News Bulletin" (Brak) :27
27. "Molly Cule" (Brak & Zorak) 1:01
28. "We're Buds" (Brak) 2:07
29. "Chili Today, Hot Tamale" (Brak, Zorak & The Brakettes) 1:19
30. "Ohio" (Brak, Wally Gator, Zorak & The Brakettes) 1:25
31. "I've Got You Under My Drawers" [*] (Brak & The Brakettes) 2:13
32. "Year of the Mantis" [*] (Zorak) :55
33. "Soup on a Stick" [*] (Brak) 1:26

=== Personnel ===
- Phil Baron – executive producer
- The Brakettes – performer
- The Braktonics - Performer
- The Chieftains – performer
- C. Martin Croker - Voice of Zorak & Wally Gator
- Alfreda Gerald – executive producer
- Eddie Horst – director, executive producer
- Andy Merrill – executive producer, Voice of Brak
- Diamond Dallas Page - Performer
- Freddie Prinze Jr. – performer
- Dave Rowland – executive producer
- Doug Schwartz – Mastering
- Peter Smith – composer, producer
- Dale Voelker – design
- Dave Willis – executive producer

== See also ==
- The Brak Show
- Space Ghost Coast to Coast
