= 655321 =

655321 is the prisoner number of Alex in A Clockwork Orange by Anthony Burgess, subsequently adapted into a 1971 film by Stanley Kubrick.

It may also refer to:

- The prisoner number of Zorak in "Time Machine", a 2001 episode of The Brak Show
- A song on the 2005 album We're Already Gone by roots music group the Beautiful Girls
- The employee number of Nolan Sorrento in the 2011 science fiction novel Ready Player One
- The prisoner number of Plankton in "Jailbreak", a 2013 episode of SpongeBob SquarePants
- The candidate reference number of Skeletor in the 2018 dystopian action horror film The First Purge
