= Space Ghost Coast to Coast =

American animated parody talk show (1994–2008)

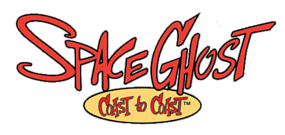
- Genre: Comedy; Surreal humor; Talk show; Satire; Parody
- Based on: Space Ghost by Alex Toth
- Developed by: Andy Merrill; Mike Lazzo; Khaki Jones
- Showrunner: Mike Lazzo
- Written by: Matt Maiellaro (Note: Seasons 1–9); Dave Willis (Note: Seasons 3–7); Matt Harrigan (Note: Seasons 3–6 & 8–9); Various (Note: Seasons 1–6 & 8–9)
- Voices of: George Lowe; C. Martin Croker; Andy Merrill
- Opening theme: "Hit Single" by Sonny Sharrock
- Composers: Sonny Sharrock; Eddie Horst; Dave Willis; Matt Maiellaro; Man or Astro-man?
- Country of origin: United States
- Original language: English
- No. of seasons: 10
- No. of episodes: 109 (Note: As well as 5 specials) (list of episodes)

Production
- Executive producers: Mike Lazzo (Note: Seasons 1, 4 and 6–8, except "Brilliant Number One, "Brilliant Number Two" (both from season 4) and "Sweet for Brak" (season 7)); Keith Crofford (Note: Seasons 4–8); Matt Harrigan (Note: seasons 5 and 8); Elliot Blake (Note: 2006–08)
- Producers: Andy Merrill (Note: Season 1); Khaki Jones; Matt Maiellaro (Note: Seasons 1 and 2); Michael Cahill (Note: Season 2); Mike Lazzo (Note: Seasons 2 and 3); Keith Crofford; Dave Willis (Note: Episodes 28–33, 54, 58–62, 65, 68, 69, 71, 72, 73 and 85); Daniel Messias (Note: Brazilian Editions)
- Animator: C. Martin Croker
- Running time: 11–23 minutes (Note: seasons 1–9); 5 minutes (Note: season 10)
- Production companies: Williams Street (Note: As Ghost Planet Industries on seasons 1–5); Cartoon Network Productions (seasons 1–5); Williams Street West (seasons 8–9); GameTap (season 10)

Original release
- Network: Cartoon Network
- Release: April 15, 1994 – July 22, 2001
- Network: Adult Swim
- Release: September 2, 2001 – April 12, 2004
- Network: GameTap
- Release: May 30, 2006 – May 31, 2008

Related
- Space Ghost; What a Cartoon!; The Powerpuff Girls; Cartoon Planet; Aqua Teen Hunger Force; Sealab 2021; Harvey Birdman, Attorney at Law; The Brak Show; Perfect Hair Forever

Space Ghost Coast to Coast is an American live-action/adult animated parody talk show produced by and aired on Cartoon Network. A spin-off of Hanna-Barbera's Space Ghost, it is hosted by a reimagined version of the series protagonist Space Ghost. It incorporates surreal and non-sequitur humor while reusing substantial amounts of animation from Hanna-Barbera series. It is the first TV series to be produced by Williams Street, Cartoon Network's in-house production studio which later started programming block Adult Swim in the early 2000s.

Space Ghost Coast to Coast is one of the first original series produced for Cartoon Network, and the earliest to not be an anthology of pre-existing cartoons. It premiered on April 15, 1994, and originally ended on December 17, 1999. It was revived on May 7, 2001, and was moved to the new Adult Swim late-night programming block on September 2, where new episodes premiered until April 12, 2004. A final season was released exclusively on GameTap from 2006 to 2008. 109 episodes were aired over 10 seasons.

Space Ghost Coast to Coast helped launch the careers of Mike Lazzo, Keith Crofford, Matt Harrigan, C. Martin Croker, Adam Reed, Matt Thompson, Andy Merrill, Jim Fortier, Pete Smith, Michael Ouweleen, Erik Richter, Dave Willis, and Matt Maiellaro. It produced the spin-offs The Brak Show, Aqua Teen Hunger Force, Perfect Hair Forever, and Harvey Birdman, Attorney at Law. The series inspired or influenced other series for Adult Swim, including Sealab 2021 and The Eric Andre Show.

== Premise ==
Space Ghost Coast to Coast uses a subverted talk show format hosted by Space Ghost as he interviews live-action guest stars, whom Space Ghost usually believes to be fellow superheroes, appearing on a monitor beside Space Ghost's desk. In early episodes, Space Ghost begins his interviews by asking guests about their superpowers. His interactions with guests can be awkward because the guests' answers are often changed to humorously match Space Ghost's questions in post-production. Later episodes feature guests being allowed to interact directly with the characters. Space Ghost is depicted to be highly idiotic with a weak grasp of basic concepts and lack of common sense, becoming more and more eccentric and egomaniacal with how he manages the show and treats his guests.

Space Ghost's bandleader, an evil talking mantis named Zorak, and his director-producer, a red-helmeted lava man named Moltar, work forced unpaid labor for Space Ghost, ostensibly as punishment for their crimes committed on the original series. They maintain passive-aggressive relationships with him, providing the bulk of the series' humor by bantering with him or sabotaging the program. Despite this, the trio often unwillingly stand up for each other in disastrous scenarios. Other Space Ghost villains, especially the Council of Doom, frequently make cameo appearances and interfere with the program.

=== Songs ===
Early seasons feature music played by Zorak and his band "The Original Way-Outs". The original theme song, "Hit Single", was composed by free jazz guitarist Sonny Sharrock and performed by Sharrock on guitar, Lance Carter on drums, Eddie Horst on bass, and Alfreda Gerald on vocals. Sharrock and Carter recorded songs for the show that were later compiled on the album Space Ghost Coast to Coast. As a tribute to Sharrock, who died in May 1994 shortly after the show first aired, the episode "Sharrock" featured fifteen minutes of unedited takes of music recorded for the show.

Seasons 4–6 feature a new closing theme by Man or Astro-man?, and in later seasons the opening theme and titles were nearly abandoned. Alternate songs are sometimes used as theme music, including the CHiPs theme song for the episode titled "CHiPs". An hour-long musical season finale featuring the bands Yo La Tengo and Cornershop was planned for the 1998 season but never produced.

== Production ==
=== Original run ===
Space Ghost Coast to Coast was conceptualized by Cartoon Network programmer Mike Lazzo after he was asked to develop a cartoon to appeal to adults. It began as an attempt to revive Hanna-Barbera's Wacky Races alongside Khaki Jones and Andy Merrill, which eventually transitioned into focusing solely on Space Ghost. The series' original title stemmed from early 1993 when Andy Merrill and Jay Edwards were brainstorming names for a marathon of the 1960s Space Ghost for Cartoon Network, trying to find things that rhyme with "Ghost". Because of budget limitations, Michael Cahill recycled clips from the original series and reorganized them on an Avid non-linear editor for a "talk show" style program. Because the series remixed limited animation, editing took the most time in production. The characters' crudely animated lips, awkward movements that resembled "paper dolls glued to Popsicle sticks", and continuity errors became part of the joke. Production of the first season was handled by Designefx at Atlanta due to its proximity to Cartoon Network headquarters. Lazzo managed to poach animator C. Martin Croker from the company; in addition to being the show's principal animator, it was also his idea to have Zorak and Moltar be Space Ghost's sidekicks, voicing both characters with sufficient mastery to have impressed Lazzo. The name Alan Laddie was the nom de plume for the show's writing staff.

Merrill assembled a proof of concept test pilot in April 1993, using archival footage of Denzel Washington, and Merrill voiced Space Ghost. The pilot never aired but an edited version later appeared on DVD, with Washington removed.

A second pilot was developed, interviewing Emma Thompson. Gary Owens, who originally voiced Space Ghost in the 1960s show, portrayed the character for the pilot. George Lowe was eventually cast as Space Ghost when Coast to Coast was officially picked up. Owens later made two appearances on the show: first as an announcer in a season 3 episode and then appeared as himself inside a caldron in a season 5 episode.

The series premiered on April 15, 1994, having aired initially at 11:00 p.m. ET on Friday nights, with an encore showing of the episode on Saturday night. Later, the program was moved to various late-night time slots, usually on weekends. In its first few years, Cartoon Network showed episodes of the original 1960s and 1980s Space Ghost cartoons (sometimes with an added laugh track) after each 11-minute episode of Space Ghost Coast to Coast. Williams Street was founded around the premiere of the third season as it progressively split from Cartoon Network management.

In February 1995, the episode 1st World Premiere Toon-In was simulcast on Cartoon Network, TBS, and TNT, serving as the launch of World Premiere Toons and showcasing Hanna-Barbera's The Powerpuff Girls short film. In the special, Space Ghost interviews a few of the new directors, while the Council of Doom members are the judges of the cartoon clips. The first run ended on December 17, 1999, with the episode "King Dead".

=== Revivals ===
On September 2, 2001, new episodes and re-runs moved to Cartoon Network's late-night programming block (Adult Swim) during the block's premiere. The series ended its television run in 2004 with its 93rd episode, "Live at the Fillmore".

In 2006, the series returned as a five-minute web series on Turner Broadcasting's online GameTap service, in which Space Ghost interviewed celebrities from the video game industry and GameTap's artist of the month. Cartoon Network had no involvement in the season, with only Lowe and Croker returning. The series officially concluded with the final webisode on May 31, 2008. The show was removed from GameTap in 2008, and the service was shut down in 2010. Despite this, almost all of the 17 episodes from the GameTap season have been found.

On April Fools' Day 2014, Adult Swim broadcast an unannounced Space Ghost Coast to Coast marathon with new material in the form of commercials featuring Space Ghost, Zorak, and Moltar in a voice-recording booth ad-libbing lines from episodes. The series has seen occasional marathons on Adult Swim since, including one on October 22, 2021, in promotion of an Adult Swim tie-in with Carl's Jr.

In commemoration of the show's 30th anniversary, Adult Swim streamed a 16-episode marathon loop on the official YouTube channel. The stream lasted for one month.

== Characters ==
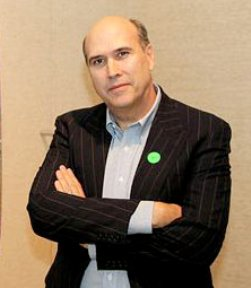
George Lowe provided the voice of the lead role, Space Ghost.

=== Main ===
- Space Ghost (voiced by George Lowe) was a 1960s superhero who fought supervillains. In the 1990s, he was brought back as a host for his own late-night talk show.
- Zorak (voiced by C. Martin Croker) is a mantis-like alien who is the band leader of The Original Way-Outs and its most prominent leader. Though Space Ghost's prisoner, Zorak retains his membership in the Council of Doom. He co-hosts Cartoon Planet and its revival with Brak and Space Ghost.
- Moltar (voiced by C. Martin Croker) is the show's director and producer. He is an alien who has a body that is made entirely of lava, and he normally wears an orange and gray full-body containment suit which has a breathing receptacle. He serves as the straight man on the show. He is a fan of the show CHiPs, in particular star Erik Estrada.

=== Supporting ===
- Brak (voiced by Andy Merrill) is a lion-like alien who, although a villain, is the weakest and least-threatening one on both this program and the earlier Space Ghost series. He appears on the series in sporadic cameo appearances, often with the Council of Doom, of which he is a member, and is often victimized by Space Ghost. He is more prominent in Cartoon Planet, co-hosting it with Space Ghost and Zorak.
- The Original Way-Outs is a band that provides music to Space Ghost's program. It consists of former Space Ghost adversaries Zorak, The Sorcerer (voiced by Andy Merrill), Parko and original character Christy. Despite their prominence, only Zorak and the Sorcerer have spoken lines on the series.
- Lokar (voiced by Andy Merrill) is a locust-like alien. Lokar seems to harbor a grudge towards Space Ghost, and constantly seeks his destruction, perhaps more for his boorishness than anything else. Lokar is a member of the Council of Doom.
- Tansut (voiced by Don Kennedy) is an overweight and cowardly alien in an orange costume and helmet. His outfit makes him appear much more menacing than he actually is. He is a member of the Council of Doom. For about half the episodes of season 4, he announces the show off-screen until he is fired by Space Ghost.
- Metallus (voiced by Michael Tew in 1994) is a big metallic creature who is a member of the Council of Doom. In his first appearance, Metallus did speak English similar to the original cartoon but it was changed to only talking in a reverb-heavy metallic drone, rendering his every word incomprehensible, though other characters seem to understand him.
- Black Widow (voiced by Judy Tenuta) is a 300-year-old sorceress. Black Widow has a crush on Space Ghost and is the only member showing no hostility to him, much to him and her fellow Council of Doom members' chagrin.
- Chad Ghostal (voiced by Brad Abelle) is Space Ghost's evil twin brother. He is a beatnik with a love for jazz music and uses outdated beatnik slang while also being a womanizer.
- Harvey Birdman (voiced by Scott Finnell) is the host of the show in the episodes "Pilot" and "Sequel." He then gets a job as a lawyer in his own spin-off show Harvey Birdman, Attorney at Law, where he is voiced by Gary Cole.

== Episodes ==
Series overview
Season	Episodes		Originally released		
Season	Episodes		First released	Last released	Network
Pilots	2		November 16, 2004		N/A
1	10		April 15, 1994	November 11, 1994	Cartoon Network
2	9		February 20, 1995	October 20, 1995	Cartoon Network
3	15		February 2, 1996	December 25, 1996	Cartoon Network
4	24		July 18, 1997	January 1, 1998	Cartoon Network
5	11		August 7, 1998	December 25, 1998	Cartoon Network
6	8		October 8, 1999	December 17, 1999	Cartoon Network
7	8	2	May 7, 2001	July 22, 2001	Cartoon Network
7	8	6	September 2, 2001	May 12, 2002	Adult Swim
8	5		January 1, 2003	December 14, 2003	Adult Swim
9	2		January 11, 2004	April 12, 2004	Adult Swim
10	17		May 30, 2006	May 31, 2008	GameTap
Specials	5		November 4, 1994	March 19, 1996	Cartoon Network

== International broadcast ==
In Canada, Space Ghost Coast to Coast previously aired on Teletoon's Teletoon at Night block, and periodically airs on the Canadian version of Adult Swim.

== Reception ==
Space Ghost Coast to Coast has received generally positive reviews from critics. In January 2009, IGN named Space Ghost Coast to Coast as their 37th favorite animated TV show in their Top 100 Best Animated TV Shows article. In 2013, IGN placed Space Ghost Coast to Coast as number 18 on their list of Top 25 animated series for adults.

Alex Toth, the creator of Hanna-Barbera's Space Ghost, was rumored to have been displeased with the usage of his characters in parody, but Toth wrote letters in which he admitted to appreciating all adaptations of his work.

In a 2012 interview, Eric André mentioned being a big fan of the show, stating it was a major influence on him while developing his own series for Adult Swim, The Eric Andre Show. Before shooting Andre would rewatch several episodes of Space Ghost Coast to Coast in a row in order to "absorb as much Space Ghost" as he could. Andre would also ask executive producer and Adult Swim president Mike Lazzo several questions about the series, as he was an executive during its production run. To Andre's surprise Lazzo had no interest in Space Ghost Coast to Coast, saying "Space Ghost is dead to me".

== Other media ==
=== Appearances in other works ===
The character Space Ghost has hosted various Coast to Coast-style interviews outside of the series, including an interview with Jim Carrey and film director Chuck Russell for the 1995 VHS release of The Mask, a 2009 interview with Zoe Saldaña to promote James Cameron's Avatar, a 2010 interview with Jack Black to promote Gulliver's Travels, a 2010 short with Steve Nash to promote VitaminWater, a 2011 interview with Tommy Wiseau interspersed during commercial breaks on Adult Swim's April Fools' Day broadcast of The Room, and a 2012 interview with Will Ferrell and Zach Galifianakis to promote The Campaign. Space Ghost has appeared in commercials for Coca-Cola, Dr Pepper, AT&T, Nestea, Esurance, and VitaminWater as well as network promos for Cartoon Network and Adult Swim. Space Ghost, Moltar, Zorak, Brak, and Mojo Jojo from The Powerpuff Girls appear in a 2002 interview with professional soccer player Hugo Sánchez on the Latin America Cartoon Network channel, and again in 2003 interviewing Óscar Pérez Rojas, which also features Eustace from Courage the Cowardly Dog.

Space Ghost frequently makes cameo appearances in episodes of or promos for other Cartoon Network or Adult Swim animated series, including a 2002 promo for The Powerpuff Girls Movie, the 2002 The Brak Show episode "Runaway" and 2003's "Enter the Hump", the 2003 Aqua Teen Hunger Force episode "The Dressing", a 2004 promo interview for Tom Goes to the Mayor, the 2004 Adult Swim special Anime Talk Show, the 2006 Robot Chicken episode "Suck It", the 2007 film Aqua Teen Hunger Force Colon Movie Film for Theaters, and the 2011 Adult Swim pilot Earth Ghost, a reworking of a 2007 live-action pilot Lowe Country. Space Ghost also appears on the 1998 series Donny & Marie to promote the CD Space Ghost's Surf & Turf, and as the announcer for the 2011 video game Cartoon Network: Punch Time Explosion, with some of his dialogue alluding to Coast to Coast.

Space Ghost appears in or is referenced in various musical works. The character is mentioned in the opening lyrics of cello rock band Rasputina's song "The Olde Headboard", which is featured on their 1998 album How We Quit the Forest. Space Ghost Coast to Coast is featured in the Danger Doom song "Space Ho's". Rapper SpaceGhostPurrp named himself after the titular character and used the character's image for the cover of his NASA mixtape. British indie band Glass Animals references Space Ghost Coast to Coast on their 2020 album Dreamland with a song of the same name.

=== Comics ===
From 1997 to 2003, Space Ghost Coast to Coast comics were published in anthology comics Cartoon Network Present, Cartoon Network Starring and Cartoon Cartoons by DC Comics. Issue 40 of the comic book Scooby-Doo Team-Up features a non-satirical Space Ghost in his traditional role as a space-traveling superhero, albeit one who captures Moltar and Zorak with the help of Scooby-Doo. Sidekicks Jan and Jace say that the two villains are clever and that once, to keep him from interfering in their plans, they even "hypnotized him into thinking he was a talk show host! Fortunately, he snapped out of it after eight seasons." On hearing that, Space Ghost frowns and says, "I don't want to talk about it."

=== Home media ===
Space Ghost: Coast to Coast has been released on home media in three widespread DVD volumes and two additional volumes only available for purchase through the now-defunct Adult Swim online store. The final six episodes of the television run have never had an official DVD release. Nearly every episode was available to buy through a "build your own DVD" feature on Adult Swim's website. Thus the final season episodes, early episodes that were left off the first volume, and unedited shows that had been altered on the official releases were now available to own, but only in DVD-ROM form.

In 2006, episodes were made available on the Xbox Live Marketplace. The series, along with other Adult Swim shows such as Robot Chicken, Aqua Teen Hunger Force, Samurai Jack and Rick and Morty, was released on HBO Max on its May 2020 launch. It was removed when the streaming service rebranded as Max.

Title	Release date	Episodes	Additional information
Volume One	November 18, 2003	16	This two disc boxset collects 16 episodes from the show's first three seasons, 1994 to 1996. "Elevator", "Spanish Translation", "Gilligan", "CHiPs", "Bobcat", "Punch", "Banjo", "Batmantis", "Story Book" (listed as "Story Book House"), "Girlie Show", "Hungry", "Fire Drill", "Sleeper", "Jerk", "Urges", and "Explode" and had 2 Easter eggs. Special features include commentaries, original artwork, and Zorak singing "Jingle Bells".
Volume Two	November 16, 2004	14	This two disc boxset collected 14 episodes from the third season, 1996. "$20.01", "Lovesick", "Transcript", "Sharrock", "Boo", "Freak Show", "Switcheroo", "Surprise", "Glen Campbell", "Jacksonville", "Late Show", "Cookout", "Art Show", and "Woody Allen's Fall Project" Special features include "Andy's Pilot", a performance by Thurston Moore, the unedited version of Matt Groening's interview from "Glen Campbell", pencil test footage, bonus footage and Easter eggs, as well as commentary on every episode.
Volume Three: This Is 1997	April 12, 2005	24	This two disc boxset collects all 24 episodes from the show's 1997 season, the fourth season, some of which are the originally aired extended versions. "Rehearsal", "Gallagher", "Edelweiss", "Anniversary", "Zoltran", "Pilot", "Speck", "Zorak", "Switcheroo (1997 Version)", "Mayonnaise", "Brilliant Number One", "Boo Boo Kitty", "Needledrop", "Sphinx", "Pavement", "Untitled", "Hipster", "Piledriver", "Suckup", "Dam", "Boatshow", "Telethon", "Dimethylpyrimidinol Bisulfite" and "Joshua". It also features commentaries by cast members, new footage, deleted scenes, the 1995 World Premiere Toon-In, "President's Day Nightmare" (without any footage from the cartoons featured and some scenes rearranged) and Easter eggs.
Volume Four: The 1998 Episodes	December 7, 2007	11	This single-disc set collected all 11 episodes from the show's 1998 season, the fifth season, one of which was the originally aired extended version. The fourth DVD released exclusively through the Adult Swim website and is titled "The 1998 Episodes" rather than "Volume Four". It includes the episodes "Terminal", "Toast", "Lawsuit", "Cahill", "Warren" (36-minute cut), "Chinatown", "Rio Ghosto", "Pal Joey", "Curses", "Intense Patriotism" and "Waiting for Edward". It also features an unfinished episode guest-starring Steven Wright titled "Dinner with Steven" and one Easter egg.
Volume Five: From the Kentucky Nightmare DVD	September 11, 2008	16	This two disc boxset included all 14 episodes from 1999 to 2001, seasons six and seven, one of which was the originally aired extended version. The fifth DVD released exclusively through the Adult Swim website and is titled "From the Kentucky Nightmare DVD" rather than "Volume Five". It includes the episodes "Snatch", "Sequel", "Girl Hair", "Chambraigne", "Table Read", "King Dead", "Fire Ant" (22-minute cut), "Curling Flower Space", "Knifin' Around", "The Justice Hole", "Kentucky Nightmare", "Sweet for Brak", "Flipmode", "Mommentary". Extras include Snatch Alt Ending, Table Read Extra, Conan Raw Interview, George Lowe Record, Clay Croker Record, Promos, Busta Raw Interview, Momentary w/Creators Commentary and Momentary: Jelly Bean and two Easter eggs.

=== Music releases ===
A Space Ghost Coast to Coast promotional CD titled Space Ghost Coast to Coast: Yeah, Whatever... featuring four tracks was released in 1995. A comedy album titled Space Ghost's Musical Bar-B-Que was released by Kid Rhino and Cartoon Network in 1997. A follow-up album, Space Ghost's Surf & Turf, released the following year.

== Legacy, spin-offs, and other adaptations ==
Space Ghost Coast To Coast was an important precursor to Cartoon Network's adult oriented programming block, Adult Swim, revolutionizing adult animation with its clever use of limited animation and surreal humor.

Cartoon Planet, a spin-off featuring Space Ghost, Zorak, and Brak hosting a variety show on the Cartoon Planet, premiered on Cartoon Network and its sister network TBS in 1995. In 2000, a special starring characters Brak and Zorak, Brak Presents the Brak Show Starring Brak, was released on Cartoon Network, with it serving as a predecessor to spin-off series The Brak Show.

Aqua Teen Hunger Force (Note: Also known by various alternative titles) and Cartoon Network Studios' Harvey Birdman, Attorney at Law were based on characters that previously appeared on the series, though in the former's case the SGCTC episode responsible was produced and aired after the series was produced. Harvey Birdman uses traditional animation to flash animation, the rest uses the same limited animation style as Space Ghost Coast to Coast. The Brak Show includes the characters Brak and Zorak, recurring characters on Space Ghost Coast to Coast.

In 2007, Cartoon Network Spain produced an adaptation of the series which aired as part of the Adult Swim block on TNT Spain. This version replaces the guests with Spanish celebrities.

In 2020, a puppet version of Brak appeared in unofficial YouTube videos uploaded by Andy Merrill. This puppet version was brought to Adult Swim in an official capacity through skits produced for the programming block Checkered Past in late 2024, during reruns of Cartoon Planet.

On January 21, 2023, Jason Segel announced in a podcast that he wrote a script for a live-action version of Space Ghost Coast to Coast.

Four boulders found on the planet Mars were named after Space Ghost, Zorak, Moltar, and Brak.

Zorak and Brak make various cameos in the series Jellystone! Season 3's "Space Con" features Space Ghost, Brak, Zorak, and Moltar, with Lowe and Merrill reprising their roles. The episode makes references to Space Ghost Coast to Coast and its spinoffs Cartoon Planet and The Brak Show.

== See also ==
- Take Two with Phineas and Ferb, animated series with a similar premise
- Tooning Out the News, animated news program with a similar premise
- Earth to Ned, a puppet talk show with a similar premise
- The Eric Andre Show, a live-action talk show with a similar premise.
