= Andy Merrill =

American voice actor

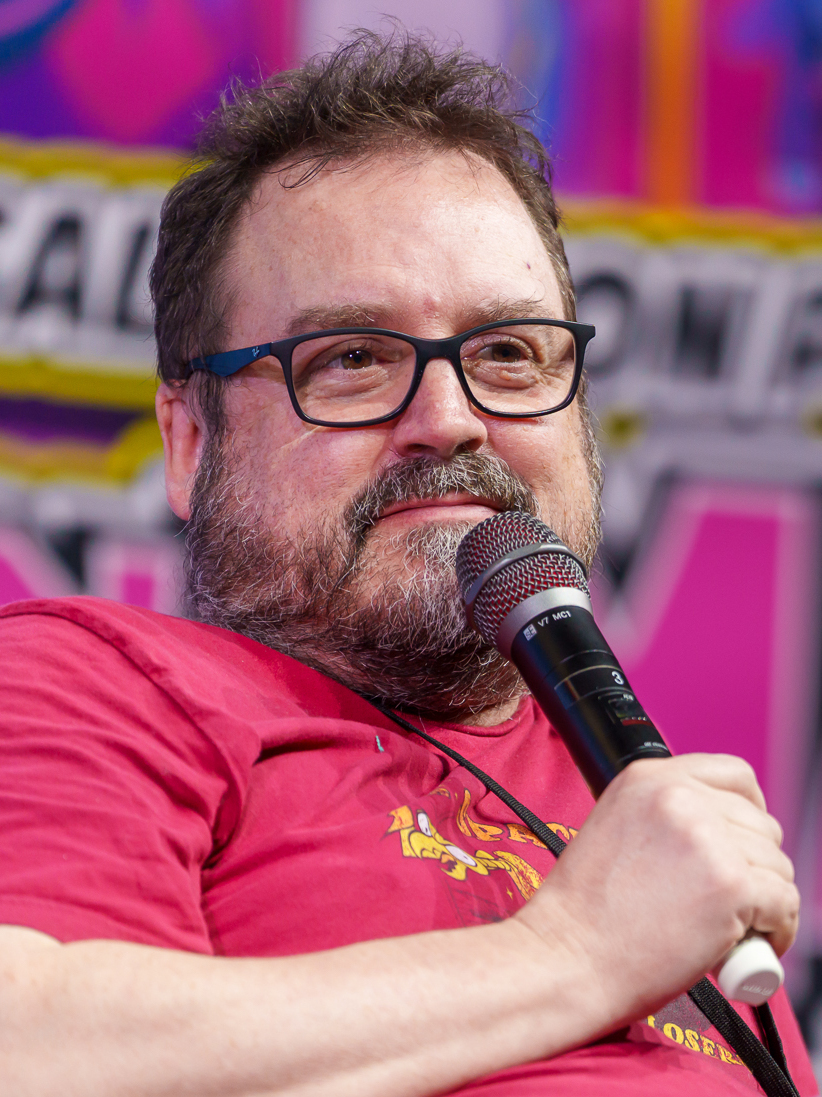
- Merrill at Animate! Columbus in 2025
- Occupations: Writer, producer, voice actor
- Years active: 1990–present
- Children: 1

Andy Merrill is an American voice actor, television writer and producer best known for his portrayal of the character Brak on Space Ghost Coast to Coast, The Brak Show, and Cartoon Planet; as well as Oglethorpe on Aqua Teen Hunger Force.

== Career ==
=== Space Ghost Coast to Coast ===
Merrill joined Cartoon Network within several months of its inception in 1992, coming over from sister company CNN. He started working in programming, and in 1993 he and then head of programming Mike Lazzo helped put together the first animated late-night talk show, Space Ghost Coast to Coast. He voices Space Ghost in the first of two unaired pilots for the show.

In April 1994, Space Ghost Coast to Coast premiered on Cartoon Network. The concept was that 1960s Hanna-Barbera cartoon superhero Space Ghost had retired from being a superhero and was hosting his own talk show, in which he interviewed live action celebrity guests, with his old archenemies Zorak and Moltar as band leader and director. To date, the show has had over 90 episodes aired on television, and was one of the motivating forces behind the creation of the Adult Swim programming bracket started in 2001. Merrill helped produce and write for the show for years, and voiced "Council of Doom" members Brak and Lokar, who appear on the show periodically, mostly Brak.

Merrill, along with Coast to Coast friend and co-star George Lowe, wrote on social media that their friend and co-star C. Martin Croker died on September 17, 2016. It was then revealed that Adult Swim would play the first produced episode of Space Ghost Coast to Coast aired 12:30 eastern, 11:30 central that night in honor of Croker's contribution not only to Space Ghost, but many Adult Swim shows in both animation and voice overs. The three of them, along with Dave Willis, Dana Snyder, and Carey Means had been friends since their earliest Cartoon Network days.

=== Cartoon Planet ===
In 1995, Cartoon Planet premiered on TBS (moving to Cartoon Network in 1996). Merrill wrote and produced the show, along with crew members who had worked on Space Ghost Coast to Coast, himself voicing the character of Brak. The main characters on Cartoon Planet were Space Ghost, Zorak, and Brak, and it was a show of skits and songs put together with the same limited animation used in Space Ghost Coast to Coast.

Originally, the skits and songs were filler for showing old cartoons owned by Turner Entertainment (Hanna-Barbera, Looney Tunes, Merrie Melodies, Popeye the Sailor) until the skits and songs became more popular and Brak developed more of a personality and grew popular with fans. The show eventually became entirely skits and songs.

=== Brak spin-offs ===
In 2000, two Sonny & Cher-style variety show specials premiered on Cartoon Network, titled Brak Presents the Brak Show Starring Brak. The show featured new animation, and new songs with celebrity guests and fellow Space Ghost villain Zorak. However, the specials were met with mixed reviews from fans. In the early hours of December 21, 2000, a new sitcom parody cartoon premiered, titled "Leave It to Brak", which was actually the pilot episode for the future Adult Swim show The Brak Show, which premiered on Adult Swim in 2001 and ran for three seasons.

Merill reprised his role of Brak on the episode "Space Con" of the Max series Jellystone! which is also based on Hanna-Barbera characters.

=== Boomerang ===
Merrill left Atlanta briefly, moving to New Jersey for a year and joining the programming department of Boomerang, an asset of the Turner Broadcasting System.

== Influences ==
In a 2003 IGN interview, Merrill stated that his parents were the biggest influences on his career. He further added Steve Martin, Soupy Sales, Jerry Lewis, and Roger Miller. Merrill has cited Shooby Taylor, Southern Culture on the Skids, The Love Bug soundtrack, and "You'll Never Go Down the Drain" by Fred Rogers as his favorite pieces of music. He has stated that One Flew Over the Cuckoo's Nest and You're Never Too Young are his favorite films, and he noted that The Simpsons, Father Ted, The Office, Look Around You, Food Network shows, and M*A*S*H are some of his favorite TV programs. Merrill has stated that Anthony Bourdain's Kitchen Confidential and A Cook's Tour are among his favorite books along with Soupy Sez, an autobiography written by Soupy Sales.

== Personal life ==
As of April 2024, Merrill was a driver for Amazon.com, tweeting on the 30th Anniversary of the premiere of Space Ghost Coast to Coast, "If you would’ve told me 30 years ago that today, I would be at the bottomest rockiest rung of the rock bottom ladder, I wouldn’t have believed you." He later tweeted that he was working part time at Adult Swim.

== Filmography ==
Year	Production	Role	Other notes
1993; 1994–2008	Space Ghost Coast to Coast	Brak, Lokar, Live-Action Space Ghost	Also developer, writer and producer
1995–1999; 2012–2014	Cartoon Planet	Brak, Dancin' Space Ghost	
2000	Brak Presents the Brak Show Starring Brak	Brak	Special
2000–2003; 2007	The Brak Show	Brak, Clarence	Creator and actor
2000–2015	Aqua Teen Hunger Force	Oglethorpe, Merle	Actor, 21 episodes
2005	Sunday Pants	Dr. Lyle Pushkin	Actor
2007	Aqua Teen Hunger Force Colon Movie Film for Theaters	Oglethorpe	Film
2007	Aqua Teen Hunger Force Zombie Ninja Pro-Am	Oglethorpe	Video game
2008	Assy McGee	Yusuf	Season 2, Episode 9
2011	Pound Dogs	Dog Pound Worker Guy	Short film
2011	Secret Mountain Fort Awesome	Additional voices	
2013–2017	Adventure Time	James, Additional voices	3 episodes
2013–2017	TripTank	Various characters	2 episodes
2015–2016	Gravity Falls	8-Ball, Teeth	3 episodes
2016	Harvey Beaks	Bag	Season 2, Episode 6
2016	Club Sandwich	Jelly Lips	Failed pilot
2018-2019	Welcome to the Wayne	Muhlstrommer	2 episodes
2022	Aquadonk Side Pieces	Oglethorpe	1 episode
2024	Jellystone!	Brak	1 episode
2024–2025	Kiff	Pat Chatterley	2 episodes
2025	Adventure Time: Fionna and Cake	Blade Wizard, Narrator	2 episodes

Preceded by Gary Owens	Actors portraying Space Ghost; 1995-1999	Succeeded by George Lowe
