= Carlos Tureta =

- Born: 1963 (age 62–63)
- Known for: The Brak Show; Cartoon Network announcer

Carlos Tureta (Londrina, May 1, 1963) is a Brazilian announcer and voice actor known for being the announcer for the channel Cartoon Network in Brazil.

== Career ==
Tureta began by narrating promos for the pay-TV channel Cartoon Network since starting with its 1993 launch in Brazil and voicing few characters on the show The Brak Show. He also oversaw adaptations and created special sound effects for Turner Broadcasting System of Latin America.

== Cameos ==
Other appearances include the Specal Terra à Vista, an animated soap opera about Brazil, and the Copa Toon events, the channel's tribute to soccer which features real players.
