= Space Ghost (TV series) =

American animated television series

- Also known as: Space Ghost & Dino Boy
- Genre: Science-fiction; Superhero
- Created by: Alex Toth
- Directed by: William Hanna; Joseph Barbera
- Voices of: Gary Owens; Tim Matheson; Ginny Tyler; Don Messick; John David Carson; Mike Road
- Music by: Ted Nichols
- Country of origin: United States
- Original language: English
- No. of seasons: 1
- No. of episodes: 20

Production
- Producers: William Hanna; Joseph Barbera
- Running time: 30 minutes
- Production company: Hanna-Barbera Productions

Original release
- Network: CBS
- Release: September 10, 1966 – September 16, 1967

Related
- Space Ghost Coast to Coast; Moby Dick and Mighty Mightor; The Herculoids; Shazzan; Space Stars

Space Ghost is an American Saturday-morning superhero animated television series produced by Hanna-Barbera Productions, first broadcast on CBS from September 10, 1966, to September 16, 1967, and continued reruns until September 7, 1968. The series was composed of two unrelated segments, Space Ghost and Dino Boy in the Lost Valley. The series was created by Alex Toth and produced and directed by William Hanna and Joseph Barbera. Sometimes, it is alternatively called Space Ghost & Dino Boy to acknowledge the presence of both shows.

The Space Ghost segments were seen again in the 1976 series Space Ghost and Frankenstein Jr. (which replaced the Dino Boy segments with the Frankenstein Jr. ones from fellow Hanna-Barbera show Frankenstein Jr. and The Impossibles), which aired on NBC from November 27, 1976, to September 4, 1977, to replace Land of the Lost.

In the 1990s, the title character and others were brought back for an adult parody talk-show cartoon titled Space Ghost Coast to Coast.

== Segments ==
=== Space Ghost ===
Space Ghost, along with teenaged sidekicks Jan and Jace and their pet monkey Blip, fight villains in outer space. Usually, Space Ghost's sidekicks would get captured or trapped by the villains, and Space Ghost would have to defeat the villains and save the day. His enemies included Zorak, Brak and his brother Sisto, the Creature King, the Black Widow/Spider Woman, Moltar, and Metallus.

Voice cast

- Gary Owens as Space Ghost
- Ginny Tyler as Jan, Black Widow/Spider Woman
- Tim Matheson as Jace
- Don Messick as Blip, Zorak, Sisto, Sandman (in "The Sandman"), One Eye (in "Space Sargasso"), Zorket (in "Ruler of the Rock Robots"), Schemer (in "The Schemer"), Collector (in "The Evil Collector"), Creature King (Council of Doom episodes)
- Lucille Bliss as Wootan (in "Brago"), Wootan's mother (in "Brago")
- Regis Cordic as Moltar
- Ted Cassidy as Metallus, Tansut (in "Hi-Jackers"), Tarko the Terrible (in "The Time Machine")
- Paul Frees as Zeron (in "The Iceman"), Cyclo (in "The Cyclopeds"), Brago (in "Brago")
- Keye Luke as Brak
- Vic Perrin as Creature King (in "Creature King" and "The Space Ark"), Lurker (in "Space Sargasso"), Pirahnor (in "Space Piranhas")
- Alan Reed as Glasstor (in "Glasstor"), Sorcerer (in "The Sorcerer")
- Paul Stewart as Dr. Nightmare (in "Nightmare Planet"), Mind Taker (in "Jungle Planet")
- Paul Winchell as Parko (in "Space Birds")
- Henry Corden as Foreign Legion Colonel (in "The Sandman")
- Joseph Sirola as Lokar (in "Lokar - King of the Killer Locusts")

=== Dino Boy in the Lost Valley ===
Dino Boy is a young boy called Todd who parachuted out of a crashing plane with his parents still on board. He lands in an unknown South American valley where dinosaurs, prehistoric mammals, and cavemen have somehow survived extinction and now live alongside some strange creatures and various tribes like the Moss Men, the Rock Pygmies, the Worm People and the Vampire Men, amongst others. Dino Boy then meets the caveman Ugh (who saves Dino Boy from a Smilodon when he first arrives) and his pet baby Brontosaurus Bronty who become his friends in the episodes to come. The cartoon also features a woolly mammoth named Tusko whom Ugh would enlist in certain episodes to help him, Dino Boy, and Bronty out.

==== Voice cast ====
- Johnny Carson (who soon switched to his full name, John David Carson, to avoid confusion with the talk show host) as Todd/Dino Boy
- Mike Road as Ugh
- Don Messick as Bronty
- Gary Owens as opening narration

== Production ==
(left) Space Ghost design by Alex Toth (right) Cover of March 1966 issue of Life magazine featuring Adam West as TV's Batman which CBS daytime programming head Fred Silverman used as an example of what he wanted in terms of Space Ghost's design.

The series came about because the head of CBS daytime programming at the time, Fred Silverman, enjoyed superheroes like Superman and wanted to incorporate classic superhero iconography with the emerging interest in both space travel as well as the Space Age for the Saturday morning lineup under a broader initiative of "superhero morning" which also included Filmation's The New Adventures of Superman. For visual reference as to what Silverman wanted from a Superhero design, he used the cover of the March 1966 issue of Life magazine featuring Adam West as TV's Batman to emphasize he wanted a Batman look for the character.

The shift towards more action-oriented animated formats proved a challenge for Hanna-Barbera as up to that point, the studio's Saturday morning output had consisted primarily of short form funny animal comedies such as The Yogi Bear Show and The Huckleberry Hound Show while many of the scripts for Space Ghost and future action adventure shows would be written by Joe Ruby and Ken Spears. Brainstorming sessions for the series would typically involve Silverman and William Hanna throwing out character descriptions and concepts with Joseph Barbera and Alex Toth translating them as rough sketches and doodles. While Toth was happy to provide designs for Space Ghost (while also complaining about the limited animation as a lack of quality), he was less enthused with working on the Dino Boy segments as he hated working on anything involving Neanderthals, dinosaurs, or the "primordial soup" and would provide such designs to comic books and animation with reluctance.

According to Barbera, when The Herculoids achieved a then unheard of 60 share in the ratings beating the already impressive 55 share of Space Ghost the previous season, this prompted Silverman not to order any further episodes of Space Ghost and instead pool support behind The Herculoids.

== Episodes ==
With the exception of the final two half-hour shows (the "Council of Doom" episodes), each episode featured two Space Ghost segments with one Dino Boy segment between them.

No.	Title	Original release date
1	"The Heat Thing" "The Worm People" "Zorak"	September 10, 1966
"The Heat Thing": A lava monster attacks Jace on Jupiter (incorrectly depicted as a cratered rocky planet). Space Ghost must save him from the monster.; "The Worm People": A tribe of worm-like creatures captures Dino Boy and Ugh must plan a rescue.; "Zorak": Zorak, one of Space Ghost's enemies, is freed from prison by his henchmen and kidnaps the twins in a revenge plot against Space Ghost.
2	"The Lizard Slavers" "The Moss Men" "The Web"	September 17, 1966
"The Lizard Slavers": Lizard-like slavers capture Jan and Jace for stumbling across their base.; "The Moss Men": While running from a T-rex, Dino Boy and Ugh are captured by the Moss Men after falling into a water-filled hole that leads to their lair. The Moss Men plan to use Dino Boy as a sacrifice. Ugh must defeat the Moss Men and rescue Dino Boy before it is too late.; "The Web": The Black Widow plans to kill Space Ghost with her minions the Tarantopods on her planet.
3	"Creature King" "The Treemen" "The Sandman"	September 24, 1966
"Creature King": After suffering a reactor burnout, Jan and Jace land on a planet where huge animals live and are controlled by the Creature King.; "The Treemen": Dino Boy is captured by a group of Treemen to serve as a sacrifice and Ugh must leap into action with the help of some mammoths.; "The Sandman": The Sandman has attacked military units to draw Space Ghost to him in order to destroy his mind and conquer the world.
4	"The Evil Collector" "The Fire God" "The Drone"	October 1, 1966
"The Evil Collector": The Collector shrinks people to use in a real-life cat-and-mouse game involving his pet six-legged alien cat Dracto.; "The Fire God": A Fire God captures Dino Boy. The Saber-Tooth People plan to sacrifice him, but Ugh is determined to foil them.; "The Drone": A mysterious figure uses a robot to steal the Phantom Cruiser. Space Ghost and the twins must retrieve it.
5	"Homing Device" "The Mighty Snow Creature" "The Robot Master"	October 8, 1966
"Homing Device": Metallus threatens to destroy Earth with a missile unless Space Ghost surrenders to him.; "The Mighty Snow Creature": Dino Boy and Ugh venture into the snow-capped mountains to rescue a young tribal girl from a large Snow Creature.; "The Robot Master": Metallus uses a robot fleet to take over Space Ghost's planet.
6	"The Iceman" "The Wolf People" "Hi-Jackers"	October 15, 1966
"The Iceman": Zeron attacks Space Ghost by using a powerful ice ray.; "The Wolf People": Ugh is captured by the Wolf People. Dino Boy and Bronty must save him.; "Hi-Jackers": Jan and Jace are captured by Tansut after they witness his hi-jacking of a ship.
7	"The Energy Monster" "Valley of the Giants" "The Lure"	October 22, 1966
"The Energy Monster": Space Ghost must fight a monster created by Dr. Soonev in a lab accident.; "Valley of the Giants": During an earthquake, Bronty is captured by a giant and Dino Boy and Ugh must save him.; "The Lure": Brak and Sisto kidnap Jan so that Space Ghost will not interfere in Brak's robbery plans.
8	"The Cyclopeds" "The Ant Warriors" "The Schemer"	October 29, 1966
"The Cyclopeds": Space Ghost must rescue the twins from Cyclo and his robots.; "The Ant Warriors": Ugh is captured by the Ant Warriors after fighting a Stegosaurus and got away. Dino Boy tries to rescue him but ends up having to save the Ant Warriors from a Megatherium.; "The Schemer": Space Ghost is ensnared in the Schemer's plan to kill the team.
9	"Lokar - King of the Killer Locusts" "The Bird Riders" "Space Sargasso"	November 5, 1966
"Lokar - King of the Killer Locusts": Lokar lures the twins to him to be captured by his killer locust robots.; "The Bird Riders": Dino Boy and Ugh are forced to protect a Bird Rider from the Rock Pygmies.; "Space Sargasso": The Lurker and his partner One Eye have been preying on ships that pass close by and now they have their sights set on the Phantom Cruiser.
10	"Brago" "Giant Ants" "Revenge of the Spider Woman"	November 12, 1966
"Brago": Brago's bandits attack an outpost and the twins must defend them until Space Ghost arrives.; "Giant Ants": While running from a volcanic eruption, Dino Boy ends up in a valley of giants. He has to run from giant ants and Ugh must come to the rescue.; "Revenge of the Spider Woman": Staying true to her word, the Black Widow/Spider Woman tries to kill Space Ghost again. This time, she uses aquatic creatures.
11	"Attack of the Saucer Crab" "The Rock Pygmies" "Space Birds"	November 19, 1966
"Attack of the Saucer Crab": Space Ghost must defeat a UFO from another galaxy that could be acting as a vanguard for an invasion.; "The Rock Pygmies": Dino Boy and Bronty get in trouble with a Smilodon and are separated. Bronty is captured by the Rock Pygmies and Dino Boy must save him while leaving markers to show Ugh where he went.; "Space Birds": An evil genius named Parko is using metal birds to attack satellites and destroy them.
12	"The Time Machine" "Danger River" "Nightmare Planet"	November 26, 1966
"The Time Machine": Jace's time machine invention accidentally sends Jan back in time, where she is taken captive by a Viking named Tarko the Terrible. When Jace also gets captured trying to save her, it is up to Space Ghost to rescue them.; "Danger River": After rescuing a kid from some Birdmen, Dino Boy and Ugh row along the Danger River to bring him home, where they encounter various threats like the Snake People and dangerous river rapids.; "Nightmare Planet": Dr. Nightmare is planning on taking Space Ghost's brain for his mechanical monsters.
13	"Space Armada" "The Vampire Men" "The Challenge"	December 3, 1966
"Space Armada": Space Ghost and the twins must stop Metallus' new, powerful missiles.; "The Vampire Men": While showing off his kite invention to Ugh, Dino Boy ends up crashing into the mountains and ends up captured by the Vampire Men.; "The Challenge": Zorak resurfaces and has created a metal monster that he thinks will defeat Space Ghost. He issues a challenge to Space Ghost...if Space Ghost wins, Zorak will leave and never return. If Zorak's metal monster wins, Space Ghost must be the one who leaves forever. When Space Ghost's Power Bands somehow fail him, Jan and Jace uncover the ruse.
14	"Jungle Planet" "The Terrible Chase" "Ruler of the Rock Robots"	December 10, 1966
"Jungle Planet": The Mind Taker is abducting people to steal their knowledge.; "The Terrible Chase": The Sun People are hunting and start chasing Ugh. Dino Boy must save him.; "Ruler of the Rock Robots": The twins and Space Ghost are forced to battle Zorket and his rock robots.; Note: the "Jungle Planet" introduction music of the opening title is from the Dino Boy series.
15	"Glasstor" "The Sacrifice" "The Space Ark"	December 17, 1966
"Glasstor": Glasstor captures the twins in order to force them to work in his glass mines.; "The Sacrifice": Ugh is captured by the Sun People to serve as a sacrifice and Dino Boy must stop them.; "The Space Ark": The Creature King is planning on using his monsters to conquer Jupiter. Space Ghost must prevent the mastermind from reaching that goal.
16	"The Sorcerer" "The Marksman" "The Space Piranhas"	December 24, 1966
"The Sorcerer": The Sorcerer is using his powerful magic for evil and plans to challenge Space Ghost.; "The Marksman": Dino Boy teaches Ugh how to shoot a bow and arrow and Ugh throws his club at a rock but it was revealed to be a T-rex who attacks them. After that, a Pteranodon kidnaps Dino Boy for food and Ugh must save him.; "The Space Piranhas": Pirahnor wants to use his space piranhas to take revenge on Space Ghost.
17	"The Ovens of Moltor" "The Spear Warriors" "Transor - The Matter Mover"	December 31, 1966
"The Ovens of Moltor": Moltor is planning on using his molten men and ships to take over the universe.; "The Spear Warriors": Dino Boy and Ugh are collared for attacking a Spear Warrior and have to fight their way out.; "Transor - The Matter Mover": Transor plans on using Jan and Jace as specimens in his zoo.
18	"The Gargoyloids" "Marooned" "The Looters"	January 7, 1967
"The Gargoyloids": Space Ghost must keep the Gargoyloids, who have inhabited a planet during their wanderings through space, from causing problems in the galaxy.; "Marooned": As Dino Boy teaches Ugh how to spell, they are attacked by venomous wasps who sting Ugh. Dino Boy must get some choka leaves from Misty Island or Ugh will die. At the same time, he must stop two Moss Men from sacrificing one of their own.; "The Looters": Brak is using sleeping gas so that he and Sisto can rob gold shipments and Space Ghost has to stop them.
19	"The Meeting" "Clutches of Creature King" "The Deadly Trap"	September 9, 1967
"The Meeting": Metallus, the Creature King, Zorak, Moltar, Brak, and the Black Widow/the Spider Woman unite to form the Council of Doom as they plan to destroy Space Ghost. Metallus goes first and uses a fleet of robots to attack Space Ghost.; "Clutches of Creature King": After defeating Metallus' fleet, Space Ghost is forced to land on the Creature King's world. Cameos by Tor/Mighty Mightor and Tog.; "The Deadly Trap": After Space Ghost thwarts the Creature King, Zorak plans to destroy Space Ghost using monsters. He also jettisons the twins when they try to rescue him. Cameos by Moby Dick, Tom, Tub, and Scooby.
20	"The Molten Monsters of Moltar" "Two Faces of Doom" "The Final Encounter"	September 16, 1967
"The Molten Monsters of Moltar": After escaping Zorak, Space Ghost and the twins are captured by Moltar. Cameos by Zandor, Tara, Dorno, and The Herculoids.; "Two Faces of Doom": Following Moltar's defeat, Brak and the Black Widow/the Spider Woman each take their turns to dispose of Space Ghost.; "The Final Encounter": After Space Ghost returns from a point in the past, he, Jan, Jace and Blip take the final fight to the Council of Doom. Cameos by Shazzan, Chuck, Nancy, and Kaboobie. This was also the only episode to have villains not associated with the Council of Doom, the Sultan of the Flame and his Fire Demon.

The final two half-hour shows only feature Space Ghost as he takes on the Council of Doom. Additionally, they feature cameos from other characters (The Herculoids, Moby Dick, the Mighty Mightor, and Shazzan) that would appear in their own Hanna-Barbera series broadcasts on CBS the following (1967–68) season.

== Broadcast ==
The series was broadcast on CBS from September 10, 1966 through September 7, 1968. From November 27, 1976, to September 4, 1977, NBC rebroadcast the series to replace Land of the Lost under the title Space Ghost and Frankenstein Jr. (which replaced the Dino Boy segments with the Frankenstein Jr. ones from fellow Hanna-Barbera show Frankenstein Jr. and The Impossibles). In February 1993, Cartoon Network began rebroadcasting Space Ghost as part of their Boomerang programming block airing the series through January 1997.

== Merchandise ==
=== Home media ===
Space Ghost & Dino Boy were released on multiple VHS tapes in the 1980s put out by Worldvision Home Video and later re-released by GoodTimes Home Video under the Kids Klassics label. The episodes on the VHS tape for Space Ghost were "The Heat Thing", "Zorak", "The Creature King" and the Dino Boy episode "The Worm People". Worldvision released another VHS tape, Space Ghost and Dino Boy: Ghostly Tales; this contained the episodes "The Robot Master", The Energy Monster", "Hi-Jackers", "The Lure", and "The Schemer". The Dino Boy episodes were "Marooned" and "The Red Ants". These same episodes were released in the UK by The Video Collection.

Warner Home Video (via Hanna-Barbera Cartoons and Warner Bros. Family Entertainment) released Space Ghost & Dino Boy: The Complete Series on DVD in Region 1 on July 17, 2007.

The DVD edition presents the episodes on two double-sided DVDs, but alters the order from the original air-date order. This episode order is also present on Blu-ray and digital sell-throughs.

A Blu-ray set of the series was released by Warner Bros. Home Entertainment (under the Warner Archive Collection label), on October 13, 2020. The release is a two-disc set containing all 20 episodes.

=== Comics ===
The TV series was adapted into a comic strip by Dan Spiegle, distributed by Gold Key Comics. He has also appeared in comics published by Marvel Comics, Comico and Archie Comics.

In 2016, Space Ghost and his allies and Dino Boy played a major role in the DC Comics series Future Quest, that also featured characters from various animated series produced by Hanna-Barbera such as Jonny Quest, The Herculoids, Birdman and the Galaxy Trio, Frankenstein Jr. and The Impossibles and Moby Dick and Mighty Mightor.

In October 2023, it was announced a new Space Ghost comic was in the works from Dynamite Entertainment. The first issue was published in May 2024. According to Comicscored.com, the Space Ghost series received a "Very Good" rating, with a Comicscore Index of 85 based on 94 ratings from critics. The series ran for twelve issues and one annual and was followed by a second series in July 2025.

=== Manga ===
A manga adaptation by Kentaro Nakajo was serialized in Weekly Shonen Sunday by Shogakukan in 1967. The manga was compiled into one volume.

== Space Ghost Coast to Coast ==
In 1994, nearly three decades after the finale of the original series, Mike Lazzo pitched the idea of an adult animated parody talk show using the Space Ghost character to Cartoon Network. Voice actors George Lowe, C. Martin Croker, and Andy Merrill joined the project, which Cartoon Network would soon air as Space Ghost Coast to Coast. The series premiered on April 15, 1994, and originally ended on December 17, 1999. The series was revived on May 7, 2001, and was moved to the new Adult Swim late-night programming block on September 2 of that year, where new episodes premiered until April 12, 2004. Two final seasons were released on GameTap from 2006 to 2008. 10 seasons and 110 episodes aired.

The show gained spin-offs in the form of The Brak Show (2000–2007) and Aqua Teen Hunger Force (2000–2015), and has been cited as inspiration for a variety of Adult Swim programming in the years since its debut. In a 2014 interview, Eric André spoke about the show's influence on The Eric Andre Show, saying, "Before we started shooting, I rented as many seasons I could get my hands on and did a Space Ghost marathon by myself in my house, just so I could absorb as much Space Ghost as I could."

== Legacy ==
Space Ghost proved considerably popular on its initial run and is credited with spurring a wave of similar superhero-themed action-adventure shows across all three major networks from 1967 to 1969. During its broadcast, Space Ghost managed to become the number one show in its time slot when aired opposite the second season of The Beatles on ABC with Space Ghost securing a 9.6 rating with a 44 share while The Beatles moved down to second place with 7.6 rating with a 36 share.

== See also ==
- List of works produced by Hanna-Barbera Productions
- List of Hanna-Barbera characters
