= Cartoon Planet =

Programming block on Cartoon Network

- Logo of 2012 revival
- Network: TBS (1995-1996); Cartoon Network
- Launched: July 5, 1995; 31 years ago (initial TBS run); September 4, 1995; 31 years ago (initial Cartoon Network run); March 30, 2012; 14 years ago (revival)
- Closed: 1998; 28 years ago (initial run); March 1, 2014; 12 years ago (revival)
- Country of origin: United States
- Owner: The Cartoon Network, Inc. (Warner Bros. Discovery)
- Headquarters: Atlanta, Georgia
- Format: Animation
- Running time: 1 hour 30 minutes (1997-1998)
- Original language: English
- Voices of: George Lowe (1995–98); C. Martin Croker; Andy Merrill

Cartoon Planet is an American television programming block that originally ran from 1995 to 1998 on Cartoon Network. Produced by Cartoon Network Productions and later Ghost Planet Industries, it serves as a child-friendly spin-off of Space Ghost Coast to Coast. It centered on Space Ghost recruiting his imprisoned evil nemesis Zorak and his loud and dimwitted archenemy Brak to assist him in hosting a variety show. A revival without the involvement of Williams Street ran from 2012 to 2014 on the network.

Cartoon Planet began as an hour-long block of cartoons hosted by Space Ghost, Zorak, and Brak. They would introduce full cartoons from the Turner Entertainment library, such as old theatrical shorts and Hanna-Barbera cartoons, including the original 1960s Space Ghost episodes (sometimes with an edited laugh-track). The host segments often included original songs, as well as skits with non-sequiturs and surreal humor similar in tone to Space Ghost Coast to Coast. New material ceased being made in 1997, and most of the songs and skits were re-packaged into 22 half-hour episodes without classic cartoon clips.

== Original series ==
Each episode included segments such as "Brak's School Daze," "Zorak's Horror Scopes," "Poets' Corner," "Brak's Monday Ratings Report," "The Top 5 Cartoon Countdown" (discontinued in 1997 after the show's Saturday-morning slot was shortened to a half-hour), "Vacation Spots Around the Universe" (pieced together from clips of Ultraseven episodes; at the time Turner owned the distribution rights to a dub created in 1985), "Messages from Outer Space" (also from Ultraseven, featuring the Hot Dog Men), "Mailbag Day", readings from "The Cartoon Planet Storybook," messages from Count Floyd (Joe Flaherty's local public-access television cable TV horror movie host from SCTV; the segments were originally shown on Hanna-Barbera's The Completely Mental Misadventures of Ed Grimley), "Learning to Talk Italian," "Nuggets of Joy from Zorak," "Zorak's Helpful Hints," and "Cooking with Brak."

The show also had short live-action segments featuring producer Andy Merrill wearing an ill-fitting Space Ghost costume doing various things like visiting a petting zoo, getting a haircut (although he kept his mask on), playing tennis, or visiting a gift shop. Intros of the show during the early years featured Merrill in the costume performing an amateur dance to the mambo-style theme music, or sitting in a chair reading a newspaper, falling asleep to lullaby music.

For the first season of the show, the opening and closing theme songs were instrumental excerpts from "No One Knows My Plan" and "The End of the Tour" by They Might Be Giants.

Clips of numerous cartoons from the Turner library would often pop up spontaneously during segments of the show, especially during the music videos. These included Tom and Jerry, Popeye, Tex Avery cartoons, pre-August 1948 Looney Tunes/Merrie Melodies shorts, 2 Stupid Dogs, The Flintstones, The Jetsons, and other classic Hanna-Barbera cartoons. Clips from other Turner-owned properties were used as stock footage as well.

At the time, head writer/producer Pete Smith described Cartoon Planet "as a cross between The Sonny & Cher Comedy Hour, The Electric Company, and recess at the Richard M. Nixon School for Wayward Boys. ...Cartoon Planet skillfully steers clear of any semblance of sophisticated humor. Forced by network muckity-mucks to air his dirty spandex in front of millions of impressionable young minds, Space Ghost dragged a reluctant Zorak and a confused Brak into the treacherous waters of sketch comedy."

Cartoon Planet resulted in three soundtrack CDs: Modern Music for Swinging Superheroes in 1996 (a non-commercial promotional album), Space Ghost's Musical Bar-B-Que in 1997, and Space Ghost's Surf & Turf, the latter two published by Rhino Entertainment) in 1998. The albums consisted of songs and dialogue skits with different background music not used in the show.

== Revival series ==
The revival of the series premiered on March 30, 2012, and ended on February 8, 2014, featuring a different format from the original series. Due to budget restrictions, Space Ghost did not appear in the revival, thus leaving Brak and Zorak to host the show as "roommates together in their own, stupid little apartment" (despite this, Brak made a mini clone of Space Ghost in one episode). Instead of classic 1960s-era cartoons being showcased, the revival featured Cartoon Network's original programming, mostly Cartoon Cartoons, from the mid-1990s to late 2000s. Also, Zorak is not trapped behind a console, instead usually playing video games. Sometimes Zorak will get interrupted by Brak, causing him to lose the game.

Airing in a format based on The Cartoon Cartoon Show, the revival aired a variety of classic Cartoon Network shows in 7 or 11-minute segments per-cartoon. This allowed for four or five different cartoons to be aired in the blocks one hour timeslot.

In October 2012, Cartoon Planet celebrated Cartoon Network's 20th birthday to which it released a special two-minute song sung by Brak. The song paid tribute to the shows throughout the network's history.

There have also been holiday-themed episodes, featuring several of the Cartoon Network programming presented in a holiday-themed episode, including Halloween and Christmas.

Starting on January 11, 2013, several Cartoon Network shows that have been short-lived, permanent hiatus, canceled, or officially ended joined up to Cartoon Planet's programming block starting with Robotomy, Secret Mountain Fort Awesome, and The Problem Solverz, all of which have since been removed in the transition back to the Cartoon Cartoon format. Other short-lived series including Whatever Happened to... Robot Jones, Sheep in the Big City, Mike, Lu & Og, Time Squad, and Squirrel Boy did not air on the block.

Starting on April 12, 2013, the block began airing YTV, Teletoon, and Warner Bros. Animation programming in which the first were Scaredy Squirrel, Almost Naked Animals, and Tom and Jerry Tales, breaking the show's tradition of only airing Cartoon Network original programming. They were subsequently removed. From June 27 to August 9, 2013, the block aired on Thursdays at 1:30 pm ET. On August 30, 2013, the block ran on a Friday night for the last time before it was replaced by Pizza Night with Pizza Steve. It aired on Saturdays at 11:30 am ET and Sundays at 11:00 am ET since September 7, 2013. Also, on November 4, 2013, the block started airing on weekdays at 2:00 pm ET.

The revival was animated in Flash, rather than cel animation, like the original Space Ghost series (several cels, mainly Brak's, were duplicated in Flash). It features stop motion scenes, such as the "Make You Go Splat!" music video.

=== Skits ===
The following are some of the skits that appear in the 2012 revival:

- Advertisements – Fake advertisements for made-up products which the show indicates as "Not Real". On rare occasions, two advertisements are shown. The first advertisement aired is for "Bushido Potatoes".
- Music Video – Brak and Zorak sing original songs. The first song is "Pizza Song". Zorak also sings in his first music video "Make You Go Splat!" which received internet fame as well.
- Zorak's Poetry Beat – Zorak recites poetry involving ridiculous items and nonsensical lyrics. In one episode, Brak recites the poetry segment because Zorak does not feel like it. The first poem is "Ode to a Diseased Chimpanzee".
- Brak's Comedy Jokes – Brak tells jokes to the audience. In one episode, Zorak replaces Brak in the segment now renamed "Zorak's Comedy Jokes" telling jokes which are black comedy jokes involving the misfortunes of the people that the joke is centered on.
- Dating Tips with Brak – Brak gives out (poor) dating advice to the audience. At the end of each skit, he says, "And that's a tip from me...".
- What's in my Mouth? – Brak slightly opens his mouth while saying "Aaaah", and Zorak has to guess what is in it. Usually, the objects are gross (such as a piece of dental cotton from five weeks ago).
- Make Stuff Happen on the T.V. – Brak and Zorak watch television and interact with the programs by poking the characters on the screen, commenting to each other, voicing them, and even giving them root beer (Brak).
- Zorak Video Game Chats – Zorak reviews a video game on his Zbox, which indicates that the games are not real. One example of a reviewed game is Pasta Grandma.
- Clones – A one-off skit reminiscent of the skits done on the original show. In one skit, Brak clones himself, Zorak, and Space Ghost. The clones are smaller, and their voices are provided by Andy Merrill's daughter. The skit continues with the little Braks singing the opening theme for the modern show.

== Programming ==
=== Programming from Cartoon Network ===
==== Cartoon Network Studios ====
Title	Premiere date	End date	Source(s)
Dexter's Laboratory	March 30, 2012	January 25, 2014	(Note: Program transitioned to the Checkered Past block.)
Johnny Bravo	March 30, 2012	January 18, 2014	
I Am Weasel	March 30, 2012	March 29, 2013	
The Powerpuff Girls	March 30, 2012	February 8, 2014	
Foster's Home for Imaginary Friends	March 30, 2012	November 24, 2013	
Ed, Edd n Eddy	April 6, 2012	December 23, 2013	
The Grim Adventures of Billy & Mandy	April 6, 2012	December 22, 2013	
Camp Lazlo	April 6, 2012	January 18, 2014	
Chowder	April 6, 2012	December 19, 2013	
Courage the Cowardly Dog	April 13, 2012	January 18, 2014	
Evil Con Carne	April 13, 2012	March 29, 2013	
Codename: Kids Next Door	April 13, 2012	February 8, 2014	
Cow and Chicken	April 20, 2012	April 26, 2013	
The Marvelous Misadventures of Flapjack	April 20, 2012	January 5, 2014	
My Gym Partner's a Monkey	April 27, 2012	August 16, 2013	
Robotomy	January 11, 2013	February 22, 2013	
Secret Mountain Fort Awesome	January 18, 2013	March 1, 2013	
The Problem Solverz	January 25, 2013	September 8, 2013	

==== Warner Bros. Animation ====
Title	Premiere date	End date	Source(s)
Tom and Jerry Tales	April 26, 2013	July 19, 2013	
MAD	June 14, 2013	February 8, 2014	
Johnny Test	November 5, 2013	February 8, 2014	

==== Hanna-Barbera Studios Europe ====
Title	Premiere date	End date	Source(s)
The Amazing World of Gumball	September 29, 2013	January 25, 2014	

=== Acquired programming ===
Title	Premiere date	End date	Source(s)
Scaredy Squirrel	April 12, 2013	May 24, 2013	
Almost Naked Animals	April 19, 2013	July 12, 2013	
The High Fructose Adventures of Annoying Orange	July 25, 2013	January 5, 2014	
The Garfield Show	December 16, 2013	December 19, 2013	

== Episode list ==
Season	Episodes	Originally released	
Season	Episodes	First released	Last released
1	22	September 10, 1997	February 4, 1998
2	33	March 30, 2012	December 28, 2012
3	91	January 4, 2013	February 8, 2014

== Broadcast history ==
The show's first run was from 1995 to 1998, premiering on TBS in 1995 and then moving to Cartoon Network later that year. New material stopped being made around 1997 and the show was repackaged into 22 half hour episodes, consisting entirely of songs and skits.

From September 24 to October 28, 2005, Cartoon Network briefly aired reruns on its Adult Swim block (for which Williams Street contributes programming to), where it ran at 5:30 am Eastern time. The series ran again on Adult Swim from July 8 to October 29, 2006, on Sundays at 5:30 am Eastern time. The reason for the show's disappearance from 2001 to 2004 was due to Cartoon Network temporarily losing the rights of all the music videos to Rhino Records, who produced the soundtracks. Often, Cartoon Planet skits would be played after an 11-minute Space Ghost Coast to Coast episode in 2000 and 2001 as a time filler.

Though no plans for a DVD release have been announced, Cartoon Planet segments are included on the Volume One DVD release of The Brak Show.

The Cartoon Planet skits aired again on September 24, 2021, as part of Adult Swim's Pete Smith Day marathon. On September 16, 2024, Adult Swim's Checkered Past block began airing episodes of the series, with 2 episodes airing every week. New interstitials with Merrill performing a Brak puppet were created for this run.
