= C. Martin Croker =

American animator and voice actor (1962–2016)

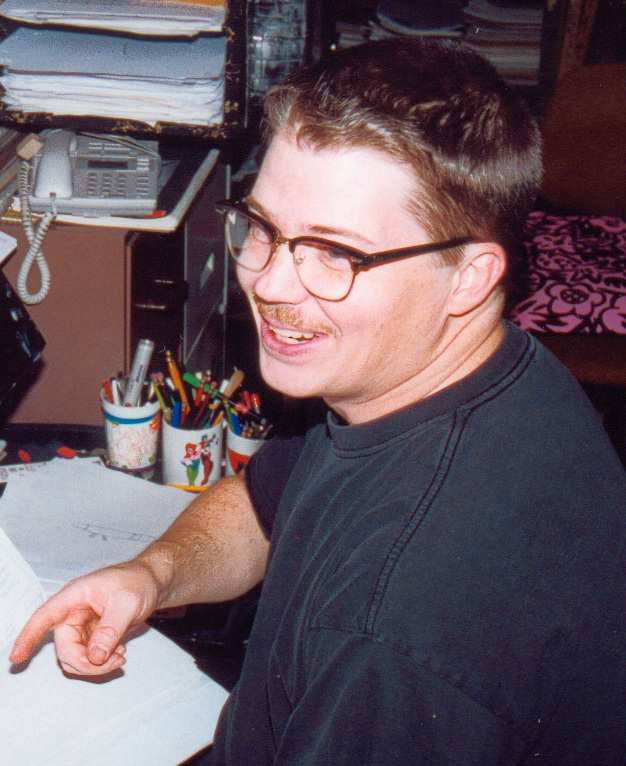
- Croker in his home studio in Atlanta, 2001
- Born: January 10, 1962; Smyrna, Georgia, U.S.
- Died: September 17, 2016 (aged 54); Atlanta, Georgia, U.S.
- Occupations: Voice actor, animator
- Years active: 1988–2016
- Spouse: April Stephens (m. 1988; div. 2014)

Clay Martin Croker (January 10, 1962 – September 17, 2016), generally credited as C. Martin Croker, was an American animator and voice actor. He was best known for having provided the voices of Dr. Weird and Steve on the animated series Aqua Teen Hunger Force, and Zorak and Moltar in Space Ghost Coast to Coast, replacing Don Messick and Ted Cassidy, who originally voiced the characters in the 1960s series Space Ghost. He was also an animator for both productions throughout their runs.

== Career ==
Croker began his professional career in animation in 1988 by providing animation of the Laser Show at Stone Mountain. He worked at Crawford Communications until 1994, where he was poached by Cartoon Network to work on Space Ghost Coast to Coast, which he would work for throughout its entire run from 1994 until 2008. In addition to being the show's principal animator, it was also his idea to have Zorak and Moltar be Space Ghost's sidekicks. He also voiced Zorak on Cartoon Planet and The Brak Show and voiced Moltar as the host of Toonami from 1997 until 1999.

Croker animated various "TNT Toons" promos for TNT in the early 1990s and helped animate and design bumpers for Cartoon Network in 1998. Croker also worked on various commercials and bumpers which often featured well-known cartoon characters.

Croker provided animation for Aqua Teen Hunger Force and its 2007 feature film adaption Aqua Teen Hunger Force Colon Movie Film for Theaters through his company Big Deal Cartoons. He also provided the voices for Dr. Weird, Steve, and various characters for the series.

Croker provided the voice of Young Man and other various characters in Perfect Hair Forever.

== Personal life ==
Croker married April Stephens in 1988, with Stephens serving as his production manager and bookkeeper as well as helping with inking prior to their divorce in 2014.

=== Death ===
Croker died at his residence in Atlanta on September 17, 2016. His memorial service was held a month later at Carmichael Funeral Home in Smyrna, Georgia. Adult Swim honored him by re-airing the first Space Ghost Coast to Coast episode produced, "Elevator", on September 19, 2016, as a special presentation. The tribute began with a brief description of Croker's contribution to Space Ghost and Adult Swim, with the words his character Zorak said in one episode: "Think of me when you look to the night sky", then the episode played. At the end of the episode, the screen shows "C. Martin Croker [1962-2016]". In the wake of the news of his death, Croker's friends and colleagues, such as his Coast to Coast friends and co-stars George Lowe and Andy Merrill, paid tribute to him in posts on social media. Adult Swim made almost every episode of Space Ghost Coast to Coast available for free on their website in honor of him.

On September 24, 2016, Croker was honored at the beginning of Toonami in a segment in which T.O.M. receives a transmission from Moltar saying he's returning to his home planet and will not be coming back, then boasting that he was the better Toonami host. T.O.M. wishes Moltar the best of luck and says "May your oven stay forever lit." An image of Croker was then shown, captioned "(1962–2016)".

== Filmography ==
Year(s)	Title	Role(s)	Notes
1994–99; 2001–04; 2006–08	Space Ghost Coast to Coast	Zorak, Moltar, Various	Animator
1997–99	Toonami	Moltar	Programming block
1995–98; 2012–14	Cartoon Planet	Zorak	
1998	How Zorak Stole X-Mas	Zorak	Video game
2000	Brak Presents the Brak Show Starring Brak	Zorak, Wally Gator, Various	Television specials
2000–03; 2007	The Brak Show	Zorak	
2000–2015	Aqua Teen Hunger Force	Dr. Weird, Steve, Various	Animator
2004–07; 2014	Perfect Hair Forever	Young Man, Various	
2005	Sunday Pants	Man	Loving Lovers in Love segments.
2007	Aqua Teen Hunger Force Colon Movie Film for Theaters	Dr. Weird, Steve, Various	Feature film Animator

Preceded by Don Messick	Actors portraying Zorak; 1994–2016	Succeeded by Jim Conroy
Preceded by Don Messick	Actors portraying Moltar; 1994–2016	Succeeded by Bernardo de Paula
Preceded by Keye Luke	Actors portraying Brak; 1994	Succeeded by Andy Merrill
