= Space Ghost =

Fictional character created by Hanna-Barbera

- Space Ghost as he appears in Space Ghost Coast to Coast
- First appearance: "The Heat Thing" (1966)
- Created by: Alex Toth; William Hanna; Joseph Barbera
- Portrayed by: Gary Owens (1966–1982, 2011); George Lowe (1994–2025); Andy Merrill (1995–99); Tom Kane (Mad); Michael Berger (Wacky Races); Paul F. Tompkins (Jellystone! season 2)

In-universe information
- Full name: Major Dickson-Yates; Thaddeus "Tad" Eustace Ghostal (in Space Ghost Coast to Coast); Thaddeus Bach / Tempus the Time Master (in the 2004 Space Ghost mini-series); Kyr (in DC's Future Quest); Dax (in Dynamite comics)
- Nicknames: SG; Broken-Wind Clap-Like-Thunder
- Gender: Male
- Occupation: Superhero, late-night talk show host (in Space Ghost Coast to Coast)
- Family: Unnamed mother; Chad Ghostal (twin brother on Space Ghost Coast to Coast)
- Spouses: Björk (wife in "Knifin' Around"); Elua Bach (wife in the 2004 Space Ghost mini-series); Charlene (wife on Cartoon Planet); Mira (wife in the Dynamite comic)
- Children: Eugene and Doris (children on Cartoon Planet); Lilah (daughter in the Dynamite comic)
- Relatives: Leonard Ghostal (paternal grandfather)
- Powers: Flight; Super strength; Enhanced agility; Enhanced stamina; Teleportation; Belt that grants invisibility/intangibility; Power Bands give an assortment of energy powers and abilities

Space Ghost is a superhero created by Hanna-Barbera Productions. He was designed by Alex Toth for the animated series of the same name. In his original incarnation, he was a superhero who, with his teen sidekicks, Jan and Jace, and Blip the monkey, fought supervillains in outer space. In the 1990s, Space Ghost was brought back as a host for his own fictional late-night talk show, Space Ghost Coast to Coast, on Cartoon Network; this version of Space Ghost, known for his dim-witted behavior and use of non-sequiturs, served as a mascot for the network since its launch, eventually moving to its programming block Adult Swim and becoming a mainstay in Williams Street productions. In the 2000s, he was revamped as a serious superhero once again in a mini-series by DC Comics.

== Development ==
The character and eponymous series came about because the head of CBS daytime programming at the time, Fred Silverman, enjoyed superheroes like Superman and wanted to incorporate classic superhero iconography with the emerging interest in both space travel as well as the Space Age for the Saturday morning lineup under a broader initiative of "superhero morning" which also included Filmation's The New Adventures of Superman. For visual reference as to what Silverman wanted from a Superhero design, he used the cover of the March 1966 issue of Life magazine featuring Adam West as TV's Batman to emphasize he wanted a Batman look for the character.

== Television series ==
=== Space Ghost and Dino Boy ===
The original series debuted in September 1966. Space Ghost was voiced by Gary Owens, who is best known as the announcer for Rowan & Martin's Laugh-In.

In the original series, Space Ghost was an intergalactic crime fighter from the Ghost Planet. He had the ability to become invisible (referred to as "Inviso Power") via his belt, fly, and survive in space. His principal weapons were his power bands which generated beam-based attacks including heat, cold, magnetism, energy, and force among others. Space Ghost's sidekicks are Jan (voiced by Ginny Tyler), Jace (voiced by Tim Matheson), and their pet monkey Blip (vocal effects provided by Don Messick).

Space Ghost would fight such recurring supervillains as:

- Zorak (voiced by Don Messick) - A villain from a race of insectoids called Dokarians from the planet Dokar.
- Lizard Slavers - A race of reptilian humanoids that capture humans and sell them as slaves.
- Black Widow (voiced by Ginny Tyler) - A spider-themed villain who controls the Tarantopods and other insects. She was later renamed Spider Woman.
- Creature King (voiced by Vic Perrin in the first two appearances, Don Messick in later appearances) - An alien who uses a mind-control helmet to control different intergalactic animals.
- Metallus (voiced by Ted Cassidy) - A mechanical alien.
- Brak (voiced by Keye Luke) - A feline alien and space pirate.
- Moltar (voiced by Regis Cordic) - The creator of the Magma Men.

The original series shared time with an unrelated segment called Dino Boy in the Lost Valley. During its original run, there were a total of 42 Space Ghost episodes and 18 Dino Boy episodes. The series ended in 1968, but remained in syndication during the 1970s.

The final episodes had Metallus, Creature King, Zorak, Moltar, Brak, and Black Widow coming together as the Council of Doom to destroy Space Ghost. They were defeated by Space Ghost and were assumed to have escaped when their headquarters was destroyed.

=== Space Stars ===
Twenty-two new Space Ghost segments appeared on Space Stars on NBC in 1981. Gary Owens reprised his role as Space Ghost, while Steve J. Spears voiced Jace, Alexandra Stoddart voiced Jan, and Frank Welker provided the vocal effects of Blip. The episodes introduced a new assortment of villains including an evil version of Space Ghost named Space Spectre (voiced by John Stephenson) who came from an alternate universe. The villains Toymaker and Wizard (both voiced by Frank Welker) made more than one appearance. As in the original series, Space Ghost often came to the aid of The Herculoids and vice versa. The Phantom Cruiser was given a more modern redesign as well. They also frequently crossed paths with the Teen Force with it appearing that Jan and Teen Force's Kid Comet were dating as well.

=== Space Ghost Coast to Coast ===
The character Space Ghost hosted a talk show, Space Ghost Coast to Coast, which began broadcasting in 1994 on Cartoon Network. The show spoofed late-night talk shows, with villains Zorak and Moltar serving as Space Ghost's sidekicks with occasional guest appearances from other Space Ghost villains Metallus, Lokar, Tansut, Brak, and Black Widow. In this version, Space Ghost is voiced by George Lowe and his real name is Tad Ghostal. The show reused animation cels from the Hanna-Barbera archives.

The show ran from 1994 to 1999, and returned with two new episodes in 2001, moving to the Adult Swim programming block later that year; the series ended its Adult Swim run in 2004. The characters of Jan, Jace, and Blip (Space Ghost's old sidekicks) appeared a few times on the show. After eight seasons on television, the show went into hiatus. New episodes of Space Ghost Coast to Coast appeared on the "Animation" channel of the GameTap service, beginning on May 30, 2006. On May 31, 2008, the show ended when the TV section of GameTap shut down.

=== Cartoon Planet ===
Following the popularity of Coast to Coast, the show provided a spin-off series, Cartoon Planet; the show ran from 1995 to 1998. Cartoon Planet was an hour-long cartoon block hosted by Space Ghost with his imprisoned sidekicks Zorak and Brak. The segments in-between the cartoons usually consisted of skits and original songs.

Due to the popularity of the series' songs, two albums were released: Space Ghost's Surf & Turf and Space Ghost's Musical Bar-B-Que. Lowe provided the voice for Space Ghost on both records.

=== Other appearances ===
- Space Ghost also appeared in some of the Adult Swim projects:
  - In the Robot Chicken episode "Suck It", Space Ghost was seen as a member of the Adult Swim Council alongside Peter Griffin from Family Guy and Master Shake from Aqua Teen Hunger Force. Additionally, Jan, Jace, Brak, and a statue of Space Ghost appear in the Robot Chicken Adult Swim Special (which is also dedicated to George Lowe, the voice of Space Ghost who died a year prior).
  - In an episode of Perfect Hair Forever, he is attacked by a bear and is friends with a shark. He makes sporadic appearances throughout the series while drunk.
  - Space Ghost appeared in three episodes of The Brak Show.
  - Space Ghost and Zorak make cameos in Aqua Teen Hunger Force Colon Movie Film for Theaters, where he is killed by a missile that Meatwad launches. This was Space Ghost's only film appearance until Space Jam: A New Legacy in 2021.
  - Space Ghost briefly appeared in Sealab 2021 episode "Predator", on a TV where Captain Murphy changes channels along with other Adult Swim shows such as The Brak Show and Aqua Teen Hunger Force.
  - In a scene of the Aqua Teen Hunger Force episode "Multiple Meat", when an older version of Frylock returns home, Space Ghost can be seen in a dumpster outside the Aqua Teens' home. He also makes a few other cameo appearances in the series.
  - Space Ghost makes cameo appearances in Off the Air, usually as a background character.
- Space Ghost makes a non-speaking cameo in the Fantastic Max episode "The Big Sleep", along with The Great Gazoo and George Jetson.
- Space Ghost appears in Donny & Marie.
- Space Ghost along with Birdman appeared in the background in multiple scenes of the Season 4 episode of The Powerpuff Girls titled "Members Only". They are shown as members of the Association of World Super Men.
- Space Ghost appears as the unseen narrator in the video game Cartoon Network: Punch Time Explosion, reprised by George Lowe. He comments over the events of the game's story, making several references to Coast to Coast.
- Space Ghost and his sidekicks appear in the Batman: The Brave and the Bold episode "Bold Beginnings!" with Gary Owens reprising his role of Space Ghost, Jan voiced by Cathy Cavadini, and Jace voiced by James Arnold Taylor. He teams up with Batman to fight Creature King (voiced by Gregg Berger) who had captured Jan, Jace, and Blip.
- Space Ghost appeared in the Mad segment "ParaMorgan", voiced by Tom Kane. He was shown with other popular fictional ghosts.
- Space Ghost appeared at the beginning, in several pictures and as a cosplayer at the "Mega Mondo Pop! Comic ConApalooza" in Scooby-Doo! Mask of the Blue Falcon.
- Space Ghost and Blip appeared in the Wacky Races episode "The Wack Stuff", voiced by Michael Berger. In a twist, Space Ghost and Blip later turn out to be Tiny and Bella in disguise.
- Space Ghost appeared in Space Jam: A New Legacy. This is Space Ghost's second film appearance after Aqua Teen Hunger Force Colon Movie Film for Theaters. Unlike that film, Space Ghost does not have any lines in the film as he is among the Warner Bros. 3000 Server-Verse inhabitants that watch the basketball game between the Tune Squad and the Goon Squad where he watched while in the air.
- Space Ghost appeared in the Jellystone! episode "Bleep", voiced by Paul F. Tompkins. He was riding around in his Phantom Cruiser when a spaceship containing Bleep and his hot sauce-irradiated clones that were created by Cindy Bear crashed into Space Ghost's Phantom Cruiser much to his annoyance. Space Ghost appears again in the episode "Space Con" with his supporting characters with Space Ghost reprised by George Lowe from Space Ghost Coast to Coast Jan was voiced by Georgie Kidder, while Jace and Brak were voiced by Andy Merrill who reprised the latter. Blip's vocal effects were provided by Jeff Bergman, Zorak voiced by Jim Conroy, and Moltar voiced by Bernardo de Paula.
- Space Ghost makes a visual appearance in the form of his own issue Space Ghost - Coast to Coast #4 in The Flash episode titled "Revenge of the Rogues" at the timestamp of 12 minutes and 6 seconds.
- Space Ghost speaks for the intro and outro of the song "Space Hoes" on the Danger Doom album The Mouse and the Mask.

== Voice actors ==
Three voice actors played Space Ghost in the three main Space Ghost series:

- Gary Owens (1966–1968, 1981–1982, 2011) in Space Ghost, Space Stars and Batman: The Brave and the Bold
- George Lowe (1994–2025) in Space Ghost Coast to Coast, Cartoon Planet, The Brak Show, Squidbillies, Perfect Hair Forever, Robot Chicken, Aqua Teen Hunger Force Colon Movie Film for Theaters, Cartoon Network: Punch Time Explosion and Jellystone! (season 3)
- Andy Merrill (1995–1999) in Space Ghost Coast to Coast as "Live Action Space Ghost" and Cartoon Planet as "Living Ghost"
- Tom Kane (2012) in Mad
- Michael Berger (2018) in Wacky Races
- Paul F. Tompkins (2022) in Jellystone! (season 2)

== Comics ==
Space Ghost has appeared in the following comic books:

- Space Ghost (Gold Key, 1967)
- Hanna-Barbera Super TV Heroes (Gold Key, 1968)
- Golden Comics Digest (Gold Key, 1969)
- TV Stars (Marvel, 1978)
- Space Ghost (Comico, 1987)
- Cartoon Network Presents (Archie, 1997)
- Cartoon Network Presents (DC, 1997)
- Cartoon Network Starring (DC, 1999)
- Cartoon Cartoons (DC, 2001)
- Space Ghost (DC, 2005)
- Future Quest (DC, 2016)
- Scooby-Doo! Team Up (DC, 2016)
- Green Lantern/Space Ghost Special #1 (DC, 2017)
- Space Ghost: The Ghost Rises (Dynamite, 2024)
- Space Ghost / Jonny Quest: Space Quest (Dynamite, 2025)
- Space Ghost (Vol. 2) (Dynamite, 2025-2026)

== Action figures ==
Space Ghost's Coast to Coast version was released as an action figure by Toycom, complete with a desk and chair, a series of cue cards and a mug. Also included were several different sets of hands, allowing the figure to be used either as the talk show host or the super hero or both. The shoulders and neck were ball-jointed, with a light plastic yellow cape. A transparent variant "invisible" figure and a variant with electric "light up" powerband were also released. A repaint of this figure was used to create a Space Spectre figure.

In 2012, a new Space Ghost figure was released in the Jazwares Hanna-Barbera series and came with a pack-in of Blip.

In 2016, Funko released 4 Pop! Vinyl Figures: Space Ghost, Brak, Space Ghost Invisible and Zorak. The last two were exclusive to the New York-based Toy Tokyo store. The same year, a new release of Space Ghost was presented by the toy company Mezco Toyz. This figure is a high quality toy and was pending confirmation of an official release date. Now recently released in June 2017 with one being the regular release while the second being a variant glow-in-the-dark figure sold exclusively from Entertainment Earth but is still being sold through other online retailers.

In 2017, Figures Toy Company released two 8 inch Mego-like sets: Space Ghost in one set and Jan, Jace, and Blip in another set.
