= Mike Lazzo =

American television executive

- Born: Michael Allen Lazzo; April 10, 1958 (age 67); LaGrange, Georgia, U.S.
- Other names: Mickey LaLamean
- Occupations: Network executive, television programmer, television producer, TV series creator
- Years active: 1984–2020
- Known for: Space Ghost Coast to Coast; Cartoon Planet; Adult Swim; Perfect Hair Forever

Michael Allen Lazzo (born April 10, 1958) is a retired American television producer and the former executive vice president in charge of the Adult Swim programming block of Cartoon Network, and its production arm, Williams Street.

== Life and career ==
Lazzo was born in LaGrange, Georgia. In his childhood, his family would often relocate, making it difficult for him to make friends. Instead, he grew heavily invested in television, cartoons (mainly Astro Boy and Speed Racer), and comic books. He dropped out of high school at 15 and for a time worked at a movie theater. In 1984, he began working in the shipping and receiving department of Turner Broadcasting System. He gradually worked his way through the programming department of Turner in the intervening years. He went to program TBS's animation block, running daily from 4:30–6PM Eastern time until 1993, when he became the first programmer in Cartoon Network's history. By 1994, he was the vice president of programming for Cartoon Network.

In 1994, Lazzo helped create the first animated late-night talk show, Space Ghost Coast to Coast, for the Cartoon Network. His production company, Ghost Planet Industries, created the spin-off of Hanna-Barbera's Space Ghost in 1995; Cartoon Planet debuted on TBS but moved to Cartoon Network the following year. Lazzo helped create The Powerpuff Girls before moving to Cartoon Network's adult-oriented block Adult Swim.

In 1997, Lazzo and GPI began production on Toonami, an afternoon block of action cartoons on Cartoon Network. In 1999, Lazzo himself appeared in a rehearsal of the Space Ghost Coast to Coast episode "Fire Ant" in an episode "Table Read". In 2004, he served as the producer for Miguzi, another afternoon block of action programming, this time aimed at a younger audience.

In 1999, Ghost Planet Industries changed its name to Williams Street, and the following year the studio started developing more non-Space Ghost-related comedy cartoons aimed at adult audiences. The Brak Show, Sealab 2021, Harvey Birdman, Attorney at Law, and Aqua Teen Hunger Force all premiered on Cartoon Network unannounced in the early mornings of December 2000, almost a year before Adult Swim officially premiered in September 2001. Keith Crofford has served as Lazzo's co-executive producer since 1994.

Since 2006, Lazzo appeared in Seth Green's Robot Chicken nine times, in which he voiced a parody of himself from 2006 to 2007, and later Clark Duke voicing Lazzo from 2008 to 2018.

On December 16, 2019, Lazzo retired from the company. In 2021, he was listed as a recipient of the Emmy Award for Outstanding Animated Program for the Primal episode "Plague of Madness". In the Smiling Friends season 1 commentary, creators Zach Hadel and Michael Cusack allege that Lazzo contributed to the show as his "final animation" for Williams Street, though he is not officially credited.

Lazzo has stated that his all-time favorite cartoon short is Nasty Quacks, which he has seen hundreds of times, and his favorite TV show is The Simpsons.
