= The Brak Show =

American adult animated sitcom

- Genre: Adult animation; Comedy; Satire; Surreal humour; Slapstick; Slice of life
- Created by: Jim Fortier; Andy Merrill; Pete Smith
- Based on: Brak by Hanna-Barbera
- Written by: Jim Fortier (seasons 1–3); Andy Merrill (seasons 1–2); Pete Smith; Various (seasons 1–2 & webisode)
- Voices of: Andy Merrill; George Lowe; C. Martin Croker; Marsha Crenshaw; Joanna Daniel; Carlos Tureta
- Composer: Eddie Horst
- Country of origin: United States
- Original language: English
- No. of seasons: 3
- No. of episodes: 28 (and 1 webisode)

Production
- Running time: 11 minutes; 5 minutes (webisode)
- Production companies: Williams Street; Turner Studios

Original release
- Network: Cartoon Network; Adult Swim; Adult Swim Video
- Release: December 21, 2000 – May 24, 2007

Related
- Space Ghost Coast to Coast; Cartoon Planet

The Brak Show is an American adult animated sitcom created by Jim Fortier, Andy Merrill, and Pete Smith for Cartoon Network's late-night programming block, Adult Swim. The Brak Show serves as a spin-off of the animated television series Space Ghost Coast to Coast, for which the show's creators originally wrote, and featured recurring characters from Space Ghost Coast to Coast and Cartoon Planet. Both programs used stock footage from the Hanna-Barbera cartoon Space Ghost, for which The Brak Show serves as a prequel. The protagonist is the alien villain Brak, voiced by Merrill, who developed a quirky persona for the character.

"Leave It to Brak", a pilot episode that serves as an earlier version of the fifth episode "Bawk Ba Gawk", originally aired prior to the official launch of Adult Swim on Cartoon Network, on December 21, 2000, at 5:15 AM. The series made its official premiere debut during the night Adult Swim officially launched on September 2, 2001, as its second inaugural program, and ended on December 31, 2003, with a total of 28 episodes. On May 24, 2007, a webisode was released on Adult Swim Video, ending the series.

== History ==
The Brak Show was preceded by a two-part special titled Brak Presents the Brak Show Starring Brak. Despite the similarities in the titles, the two Brak Shows have very little in common. The specials parodied variety shows, while the series was a spoof of early sitcoms. Each of the specials aired in the United States only once in February and March 2000, respectively.

The series premiered with a sneak peek unannounced in the early hours of December 21, 2000, along with the "Radio Free Sealab" episode of Sealab 2021. This "stealth" pilot (titled "Leave It to Brak") featured hand-drawn backgrounds and different opening titles. The show's official showing was on Adult Swim's debut on September 2, 2001.

It originally started as a parody of sitcoms which depicts the day-to-day lives of the dysfunctional Guerta family, including Brak, as well as Zorak, various other neighbors, and peers from Learnmore High School, but just like its sister show, Aqua Teen Hunger Force, the plot becomes increasingly surreal and uninvolved. The setting is Spacetown, which resembles American suburbia, but with an extra-planetary hint. A Saturn-like planet appears in the background on occasion, and many of the extras are aliens. Often, episodes parody stereotypical plot tropes seen in regular sitcoms.

The show was canceled in December 2003. However, on October 22, 2006, Adult Swim announced in a bumper that The Brak Show would return to production as an internet cartoon on the network's website. On May 24, 2007, a single webisode premiered online, but no further webisodes were produced thereafter, hence serving as the de facto series finale.

On August 1, 2008, Adult Swim had a retro night, an all-night marathon of shows featured on Adult Swim in 2001 and 2002. Two of the early episodes of The Brak Show aired during the marathon. The series has since appeared in Adult Swim's "DVR Theater". Since 2019, Adult Swim has aired The Brak Show as part of "Pete Smith Day", a yearly event celebrating the career of one of The Brak Show's co-creators.

== Characters ==
From the left: Dad, Mom, Brak, and Zorak. Taken from the prototype pilot "Leave It to Brak".

- Brak (Andy Merrill) is a teenage alien with lion features with an eccentric personality and a speaking lisp, who is a student at Learnmore High School. He is quite silly and unintelligent but with a very sweet and gentle personality. He still has attachments to stuffed animals but starts to get attracted to girls. He frequently breaks into impromptu song, lyrically about events in the episode. The writers use a wide variety of musical styles for the songs — covering jazz, country, show tunes, rap, and rock & roll. His closest friend is Zorak, although in return he treats him with open contempt and little respect. Brak's demeanor is derived from his appearances on both Space Ghost Coast to Coast and its spin-off Cartoon Planet.
- Zorak (C. Martin Croker) is another character from Space Ghost Coast to Coast, a 40-year-old anthropomorphic human-sized mantis-like alien who poses as a teenager to attend Learnmore High School. On this show, he plays the role similar to that of the Eddie Haskell character, who is also a sociopathic, sadistic, morally bankrupt misanthrope who expresses more than a platonic interest in Mom. He hangs out with Brak, but only as a way to force him into doing something for his own benefit. Zorak considers himself "above" the Guertas, and is constantly criticizing and insulting them. He enjoys bullying Clarence, the neighborhood nerd. He is also homophobic, breaking into furious rage when one of his romantic interests, Pepper, is revealed to be male.
- Dad (George Lowe) is a middle-aged small human and illegal alien with a Cuban accent, who is extremely self-centered, lazy, and nonsensical. Unemployed since 1984, most of his time is spent sitting at the kitchen table and reading the newspaper. An episode seldom goes by without him delivering "fatherly advice" or a "moral of the story" that is often incoherent or has no relevance to the situation, and typically ends in a non sequitur. Occasionally, he displays prominent womanizing and male-chauvinistic behavior, which is sometimes rebuked by his wife. In an Adult Swim New Year's Eve bumper in 2003, he revealed his name to be "Javier". He is also extremely incompetent at holding a paid job; during his brief stint working at the ice cream shop in the episode "We Ski in Peace", he tries to take his break immediately after the store opens and shoots the ice cream because "it was about to rob [the ice cream store]". In the same episode, he is shown to have a high-ranking job in protecting the Earth in a base underneath the house, but does so for free. He also cares little for his children, doing things like using Brak's college funds to buy a ski boat and being unfazed when Sisto was selected as "the lucky one" and seized by an alien mothership.
- Mom (Marsha Crenshaw in episodes 1–13, 18 (DVD), 28, and the webisode, Joanna Daniel in episodes 14–17, 18 (broadcast), and 19–28) is a middle-aged creature of the same "species" as Brak, with a more humanoid facial structure and the fashions of a housewife character on a 1950s sitcom. She is largely the only semi-sane character on the show. She displays little romantic or sexual interest in her husband and only tolerates him for her children's sake. When she gets drunk, however, she finds him suddenly irresistible. When voiced by Crenshaw, she is most often a homage to June Cleaver and similar motherly characters, with occasional hints of discontent with her husband's laziness and, most importantly, his sexism. When Daniel took over the role, Mom inexplicably acquired a British accent and became far more open in her discontent with domestic life and her annoyance with and disdain for her husband. Her change in accent has been commented upon several times on the show. In the last episode, "Cardburkey", it's revealed that the Mom with the British accent was a replacement for the previous Mom.
- Thundercleese (Carey Means) is Brak's next-door neighbor, an anthropomorphic militant killbot (with the visual appearance of a Gundam or a similar mecha) who is passionate about his lawn and garden, particularly the gnomes that decorate it. A short-lived shtick involved Thundercleese blasting Zorak whenever intentionally provoked. He is very aggressive and warlike, always speaking in a loud, robotic monotone. When Brak is troubled, no matter what the problem is, Thundercleese invariably suggests swift and brutal retaliation. Thundercleese's social skills are rather lacking, and before social get-togethers, he studies very bad "party jokes" in preparation. Thundercleese's creator is MoroccoBotix, as shown in an early episode of the series, and a special 2003 New Year's Eve event on Adult Swim in 2003 revealed that Aqua Teen Hunger Force's Frylock bought and raised him, which is the in-universe reason for their similar voices.
- Clarence (Andy Merrill) is Brak's second closest friend, a teenage chubby purple alien from Learnmore High School. He was a supporting character on the show who made more regular appearances towards the end of the series. Clarence is socially awkward and idolizes Brak. His constant talking often annoys those around him, and when faced with an extremely stressful situation, he wears his mother's sundress and bonnet for comfort. In a rap contest, he revealed that he dearly misses his father, who left them for unknown reasons. In the same contest, he also noted that his mom has since married his stepfather Gary, whom he does not like. Many of his appearances end with him being maimed, usually by Zorak. According to Andy Merrill, he was originally going to be the series' version of Space Ghost villain The Schemer but the one-shot character Butchy Toughington ended up becoming The Brak Show version of The Schemer instead of Clarence.
- Sisto is Brak's younger brother, an elementary school aged "space cat" who resembles his elder brother even though he wears a red outfit as opposed to his brother's blue one. In three early episodes, he would make random appearances walking across the room farting. He was killed and eaten by mothership aliens in his fourth and final appearance in the episode "Pepper". Afterwards, only a picture of himself was depicted on a scratch and sniff card in the episode "Sexy New Brak Show Go".

== Episodes ==
Season	Episodes	Originally released	
Season	Episodes	First released	Last released
1	9	December 21, 2000	December 2, 2001
2	11	April 14, 2002	December 29, 2002
3	8	October 5, 2003	December 31, 2003
Webisode		May 24, 2007	

=== Season 1 (2000–01) ===
No. overall	No. in season	Title	Written by	Original release date	Prod. code
1	1	"Bawk Ba Gawk" "B.J. and the Brak" "Leave It to Brak" (original version)	Jim Fortier, Andy Merrill & Pete Smith	December 21, 2000 (original version on Cartoon Network); October 7, 2001 (official version on Adult Swim)	2109
Zorak convinces Brak that he will be more popular at school if he steals the rival high school's mascot. It ends up causing trouble with Brak's parents. Note: An earlier version of this episode, featuring 2D backgrounds, originally aired on Cartoon Network on December 21, 2000. An updated official version of this episode, featuring the regular 3D backgrounds and some minor changes, later made its official debut on Adult Swim on October 7, 2001. The early version of this episode is titled "Leave It to Brak", which is not to be confused with the later episode "Goldfish" (S1E2), which also goes under the alternative title "Leave It to Brak".
2	2	"Goldfish" "Leave It to Brak"	Jim Fortier, Andy Merrill & Pete Smith	September 2, 2001	2101
Brak promises to take care of Mr. Thundercleese's goldfish Mr. Tickles (Matt Maiellaro). Note: This episode is not to be confused with the aforementioned early version of "Bawk Ba Gawk" (S1E1), which is titled "Leave It to Brak", just like the alternative title of "Goldfish".
3	3	"Time Machine" "Diff'rent Braks"	Jim Fortier, Andy Merrill & Pete Smith	September 2, 2001	2103
Brak and Zorak didn't finish their homework on time, so they use Thundercleese's time machine to go back in time to set things right.
4	4	"War Next Door" "Gimme a Brak"	Jim Fortier, Andy Merrill & Pete Smith	September 9, 2001	2102
Zorak makes Brak jealous when he develops a wonderful singing voice after accidentally having a pink lump knocked out of his throat. Guest-starring Jason Bowen as Zorak's singing voice.
5	5	"Hippo" "The Braks of Life"	Jim Fortier & Pete Smith	September 9, 2001	2104
Brak is upset because Zorak made him get rid of his lobster doll, Hippo. Brak eventually gets a new doll, Dr. Grumbles, which used to belong to Thundercleese, only for Zorak to discover that Dr. Grumbles is actually a powerful and indestructible demon.
6	6	"Mobab" "Laverne and Brak"	Jim Fortier & Pete Smith	October 21, 2001	2105
When an alien named Mobab falls in love with Mom and takes her away to his home planet, Dad realizes how much he needs her and feels sorry for mistreating her earlier in the episode. He and Brak go into outer space to save her.
7	7	"Expiration Day" "Brak's My Momma"	Jim Fortier & Pete Smith	November 4, 2001	2106
Thundercleese finds his powers have been deactivated by his creators from MoroccoBotix Inc., which is a bad thing as there is an asteroid heading for The Planet. Dad and Brak go to the MoroccoBotix office to request reactivation of his powers so that he can save everyone.
8	8	"Psychoklahoma" "Father Knows Brak"	Jim Fortier, Andy Merrill & Pete Smith	December 2, 2001	2107
Brak and company attempt to raise money to save Señor Science by putting on a musical (a merger of Psycho and Oklahoma!). Guest-starring Jason Bowen as Zorak's singing voice.
9	9	"The Eye" "Petticoat Brak"	Jim Fortier & Pete Smith	December 30, 2001	2108
Dad, retired staring contest expert, is challenged by Brak, Zorak, and a mysterious guest. Dad has no choice but to take them on.

=== Season 2 (2002) ===
No. overall	No. in season	Title	Written by	Original release date	Prod. code
10	1	"Poppy"	Jim Fortier, Andy Merrill & Pete Smith	April 14, 2002	2201
While watching his favorite cop show, Schnozzo, Brak tells Zorak that he wants to get some action. Brak asks Dad and Mom for some advice. They give Brak some help passed down from Brak's grandfather, Poppy, which Brak puts to use. Guest-starring Don Kennedy as Poppy.
11	2	"Bully"	Jim Fortier & Pete Smith	April 28, 2002	2202
Zorak has set up a booth where children give him money to beat them up. Unfortunately, the business has been taken over by the new kid in town, Roy "Butchy" Toughington.
12	3	"Mother, Did You Move My Chair?"	Jim Fortier & Pete Smith	May 12, 2002	2203
Brak tries to get out of going to school to avoid dissecting a clam in Biology class. Dad thinks that someone moved his chair.
13	4	"President Dad"	Jim Fortier & Pete Smith	May 26, 2002	2204
Dad decides to run for President of the neighborhood association. Unfortunately, he doesn't know that the incumbent Galrog used to be a terrible planet-eating monster. (Note: Galrog's appearance is an homage to a Dalek from Doctor Who.)
14	5	"Brakstreet" "Brakstreet: Men in the Band"	MC Chris, Nora Smith, Jim Fortier & Pete Smith	November 3, 2002	2209
With high hopes of winning a fabulous spa resort vacation, Brak enters a rap contest. Guest-starring rapper CeeLo Green as Prime Cut Miggity-Mo' Macdaddy Gizzabang Doggy Dog Dog.
15	6	"Feud"	Jim Fortier & Pete Smith	November 10, 2002	2207
Dad and Thundercleese are in the midst of a neighborhood feud. Guest-starring "Weird Al" Yankovic as Petroleum Joe.
16	7	"Runaway"	Matt Maiellaro, Pete Smith & Jim Fortier	November 17, 2002	2208
When Brak's dad sentences him to 3 years in his room for making his knees cry, Brak escapes from his room. He ends up in a rocket ship with Zorak and Moltar. Space Ghost arrives at the house to arrest Brak for crimes he has committed in the future.
17	8	"The New Brak"	Jim Fortier & Pete Smith	November 24, 2002	2206
Brak has a devoted admirer named Clarence which is initially quite flattering, but when the admirer starts imitating him, Brak worries that he might be replaced. Space Ghost makes a cameo appearance.
18	9	"Pepper"	Jim Fortier & Pete Smith	December 1, 2002	2205
Dad believes the mothership will select him as "the lucky one" and take him away to be king of the alien world. Meanwhile, Zorak begins a relationship with an interesting alien named Pepper, who is actually the special agent tasked with the selection process by the Commodore of the mothership. Unfortunately, Sisto is selected, seized by the mothership aliens, and killed for their dinner.
19	10	"Dinner Party"	Teleplay by : Jim Fortier & Pete Smith; Additional teleplay dialogue : Matt "Van" Maiellaro, MC Chris & Nora "the explorer" Smith	December 15, 2002	2210
Brak, Mom, Dad, and Thundercleese have been invited to a dinner party at the new neighbors' house. The neighbors include Franklin (a nervous dad, whose nose grows every time he lies), Rhonda from the Seventh Level of Yar (a mother who lives in a steel box, and keeps talking about everyone's judgement), and Winston (their son, a large man that looks similar to an infant, and is incapacitated due to his size). Zorak doesn't appear in this episode at all.
20	11	"We Ski in Peace"	Jim Fortier, Andy Merrill, Pete Smith, Dave Willis & Matt Maiellaro	December 29, 2002	2211
Brak wants to go to work with Dad for "Go to Work with your Father Day". Mom tells Brak the truth that Dad doesn't have a job. Dad shows mother a secret underground base, where he works for free keeping Earth safe. Mom forces him to get a real, paid job at the local Ice Cream Shop, and Clarence becomes his boss. Meanwhile, Alien Ants from Outer Space attack Spacetown.

=== Season 3 (2003) ===
No. overall	No. in season	Title	Written by	Original release date	Prod. code
21	1	"Braklet, Prince of Spaceland"	Jim Fortier & Pete Smith	October 5, 2003	2301
Brak's family presents their take on the classic Hamlet story. Dad is murdered by Zorak, who tricks Mom into thinking that they're married. Brak gets insane to the point of attempting to kill everybody, especially Zorak.
22	2	"Coma"	Jim Fortier & Pete Smith	October 12, 2003	2302
Dad offers to help Thundercleese win the heart of his true love, a vacuum cleaner, even though he bought it for his own use. Zorak burns things, including Clarence.
23	3	"Shadows of Heat"	Jim Fortier & Pete Smith	October 19, 2003	2303
Dad is playing a dangerous game, with George Martinez, Hector Riviera, and Rudolpho the Butcher. Quickly, Dad's 'dirty world of espionage and intrigue' drags in Mom, Brak, and even Zorak. All the while, The Shadows of Heat flicker and swirl.
24	4	"Splat"	Jim Fortier & Pete Smith	October 26, 2003	2305
Mom is gone for a vacation and has hired lookalike Brenda to tend to her family in her absence. She and Dad are involved in an accident that must be kept secret from Brak. They killed Zorak in a fatal car crash.
25	5	"Enter the Hump"	Jim Fortier & Pete Smith	November 2, 2003	2304
After being bitten by a radioactive camel, Dad is given superpowers. Space Ghost returns once again, and Zorak doesn't appear in this episode at all.
26	6	"Sexy New Brak Show Go"	Jim Fortier & Pete Smith	November 9, 2003	2306
Brak wins a cereal contest, giving him and his family their own TV commercial. The Rizaya Profit Corporation executive Mr. Kiori directs the commercial. Guest starring George Takei as Mr. Kiori.
27	7	"All That I Desire You"	Jim Fortier & Pete Smith	November 16, 2003	2307
Brak's family presents their take on a soap opera. Tragedy! Wealth! Passion! Betrayal! Incest! Doctors! The Photographs! Zorak!
28	8	"Cardburkey"	Jim Fortier & Pete Smith	December 31, 2003	2308
Brak decides that living in a cardboard box will help him snare some women. Clarence loses his virginity to a vicious bloodcat who turns out to be a buxom blonde woman placed under a spell by her mother-in-law.

=== Webisode (2007) ===
Title	Written by	Original release date
"Space Adventure"	Nora Smith & Pete Smith	May 24, 2007
Brak has a space adventure while Zorak 69s with Brak's mom.

== International broadcast ==
In Canada, The Brak Show previously aired on Teletoon's Teletoon at Night block, and currently airs on the Canadian version of Adult Swim.

== Home releases ==
Warner Home Video released the first 14 episodes on DVD on February 1, 2005, and the remaining episodes were released on August 8, 2006. In addition to being available on DVD, The Brak Show is also available on iTunes. The series was made available on HBO Max on September 1, 2020.

DVD name	Release date	Ep #	Additional information
Volume One	February 1, 2005	14	This two-disc box set contains the first 14 episodes of The Brak Show in production order. Bonus features include commentaries on two episodes, a never-produced pilot for a radio version of the show, the Brak Presents the Brak Show Starring Brak special, a few segments from Cartoon Planet, and a few "Easter eggs".
Volume Two	August 8, 2006	14	This two-disc box set contains the last 14 episodes of The Brak Show in production order. There are no bonus features. For this set, Cartoon Network abandoned their usual digipak packaging design in favor of a more modern Amaray keep case.
