= History of Cartoon Network =

Historical timeline

A variation of the first Cartoon Network logo used since 2010

Cartoon Network is an American basic cable and satellite television channel that is part of The Cartoon Network, Inc., a corporate umbrella within the television division of Skydance, which primarily focuses on animated programs.

== 1986–1992: Development ==
On March 25, 1986, Ted Turner's Turner Broadcasting System acquired Metro-Goldwyn-Mayer/United Artists from Kirk Kerkorian. However, due to concerns over the debt load of his companies, Turner was forced to sell MGM/UA back to Kerkorian on August 26, 1986, after just 75 days of ownership. However, Turner kept much of MGM's film and television library made before May 1986 (as well as some of the United Artists library) and both formed Turner Entertainment Co. and created Turner Network Television from it. The pre-May 1986 MGM library also included animated shorts from United Artists' acquisition of Associated Artists Productions. In 1991, Turner acquired Hanna-Barbera for $320 million, outbidding MCA Inc. (Universal Studios) and Hallmark Cards.

Through these acquisitions, Turner gained an expansive animation library. Outside of Metro-Goldwyn-Mayer cartoons and Hanna-Barbera productions, the company's catalogue also included pre-1948 Warner Bros. and Popeye cartoons, enabling them to establish its own children's programming-focused network. Hanna-Barbera's intellectual property proved to be a great advantage for brand recognition.

Ted Turner selected Betty Cohen, then Senior Vice President of TNT, to develop a new network to showcase these animated programs. Several potential names, such as Toon City and Cartoonia, were considered before the decision to name it Cartoon Network. On February 18, 1992, Turner Broadcasting announced plans to launch Cartoon Network as a platform for its animation library.

== 1992–1997: Launch and Checkerboard era ==
The original Cartoon Network logo, used from October 1, 1992, to June 13, 2004.

On March 12, 1992, The Cartoon Network, Inc. was founded. Seven months later on October 1, 1992, its namesake television channel was launched, with the first program being Droopy's Guide to the Cartoon Network, hosted by MGM cartoon character Droopy, featuring the first cartoon to air on the network, Rhapsody Rabbit. At first, cable providers in Atlanta, Boston, Chicago, Cincinnati, Columbus, Ohio, Los Angeles, Miami, New York City, Philadelphia, Washington, D.C., Dallas, and Detroit carried the channel.

Cartoon Network was not the first cable channel to have relied on cartoons to attract an audience (USA Network had USA Cartoon Express since 1982); however, it was the first 24-hour single-genre channel with animation as its main theme. At the time, Nickelodeon was the primary option for basic cable children's programming, but even with its new cartoon block, Nicktoons, it accounted for only a portion of total cartoon viewership, giving Cartoon Network the advantage with it focused exclusively on animation. Turner Broadcasting modeled Cartoon Network after CNN, aiming for a profitable single-genre channel. The concept was initially thought unlikely to attract a sufficient audience, but the achievements of CNN and the broad appeal of animation led Turner to believe that Cartoon Network could also achieve prominence. Cohen, the network's first president, also saw its potential not just as an outlet for Turner's animation library, but as a brand that could showcase animation as a platform in its own right. In the following years, she made Cartoon Network's appeal fit more of a psychographic, rather than a standard demographic like with most basic cable channels.

Initially, the channel aired a continuous schedule of classic cartoons, organized into themed blocks such as Down Wit' Droopy D (Droopy Dog shorts), The Tom and Jerry Show, Bugs and Daffy Tonight (Looney Tunes classics), Late Night Black and White (1930s black-and-white cartoons), and ToonHeads (similar-themed shorts with trivia). The majority of the classic animation that was shown on Cartoon Network no longer airs on a regular basis, but Tom and Jerry and Looney Tunes continued to air up until 2017. Cartoon Network also promoted various aspects of animation, such as supporting ASIFA-Hollywood and advocating for the preservation of animation history. They recruited animation historians like Jerry Beck to join their advisory board and showcased international animation, including Canadian animated shorts under the O Canada block, as well as independent student films from the ASIFA-East Animation Festival.

Initial challenge for Cartoon Network was to overcome its low penetration of existing cable systems. When launched on October 1, 1992, the channel was only carried by 233 cable systems (roughly 2 million subscribers). To grow its audience, the network used package deals, offering access alongside sister channels TNT and TBS. By 1994, ratings increased significantly, and the channel ranked as the fifth most widely distributed U.S. cable network. Early on, Hanna-Barbera productions such as The Real Adventures of Jonny Quest, SWAT Kats: The Radical Squadron, and 2 Stupid Dogs, aired on the network, in addition to TBS and TNT to increase exposure. The first international feed of Cartoon Network launched on April 30, 1993, in Latin America. Additional feeds followed across Europe and other regions on September 17, 1993, as part of Cartoon Network Europe, thus founding Cartoon Network Worldwide the following year, to further brand growth.

Cartoon Network's first exclusive original show was The Moxy Show, an animation anthology series first airing in 1993, used as an attempt to create a network mascot. Its first produced series, Space Ghost Coast to Coast in 1994, is a parody of talk shows, featuring live-action guests interacting humorously with reused animation of Hanna-Barbera series. This approach helped attract a young adult audience and expanded the network's appeal beyond children, leading to the production of programming block Cartoon Planet for children with the same team.

In 1994, Hanna-Barbera founded a new division to produce programming exclusive to Cartoon Network, which was eponymously named Cartoon Network Studios and started production on What a Cartoon! (also known as World Premiere Toons and Cartoon Cartoons). This show debuted in 1995, offering original animated shorts commissioned from Hanna-Barbera and various independent animators. The network marketed the series as a way to offer more creative control to animators, higher budgets, and a break from limited animation. Cartoon Network was able to assess the potential of certain shorts to serve as pilots for spin-off series and signed contracts with their creators to create ongoing series. Dexter's Laboratory was the first spin-off of What a Cartoon! in 1996 after winning a 1995 viewer vote.

== 1997–2004: Starburst and Powerhouse eras ==
Between 1997 and 1999, more original series debuted based on What a Cartoon! pilots, including Johnny Bravo, Cow and Chicken and its spinoff I Am Weasel, The Powerpuff Girls, Courage the Cowardly Dog, and Mike, Lu & Og. The series Ed, Edd n Eddy, which did not have a What a Cartoon! pilot, also premiered in 1999. These series premiered bearing the "Cartoon Cartoons" brand, airing throughout the network's schedule and showcased during Cartoon Cartoon Fridays, which launched on June 11, 1999, as the main night for premieres. In 1995, Cartoon Network launched "Cartoon Network Online" as an AOL-exclusive site, later rebranded as CartoonNetwork.com. The website offered games, videos, shopping, Cartoon Orbit (introduced in 2000), and promotions for movies, video games, toys, and more. It also featured the network's first online original series, Web Premiere Toons, which ran interactive web cartoons from 1999 to 2002. Starting in 1996, Cartoon Network aired two Sunday morning preschool programs: Big Bag (live-action/puppet show with animated shorts by Children's Television Workshop) until 2001, and Small World (animated series from abroad) until 2002.

In 1997, Cartoon Network launched a new action block titled Toonami. Its lineup initially consisted of 1980s reruns of Robotech and ThunderCats. However, as its run progressed, anime such as Sailor Moon, Tenchi Muyo!, Mobile Suit Gundam Wing, and Dragon Ball Z would come to dominate the block. Toonami was hosted by Moltar from the Space Ghost franchise until 1999, where Toonami was later hosted by its own original character, a muscular teenage robot named TOM. On March 2, 1998, the network got its first major reface, featuring the Raymond Scott instrumental "Powerhouse". These bumpers lasted from 1998 to 2004.

In 1996, Turner Broadcasting merged with Time Warner, consolidating Cartoon Network's access to Warner Bros. cartoons, including the post-July 1948 and black-and-white cartoons. These cartoons were still licensed to Nickelodeon, ABC, and The WB, but began moving to Cartoon Network between 1997 and 2000. Newer animated productions by Warner Bros. Animation also started appearing on the network – mostly reruns of shows that had aired on sister block Kids' WB and some from Fox Kids, along with new programs such as Justice League and Teen Titans.

Between 1997 and 1998, Cartoon's viewership rose from 38 million to 54 million households, and it became the second-most popular network in its demographic of 6–11-year-olds in basic cable after Nickelodeon. In 1999, Cartoon Network introduced interstitials under the Groovies and Shorties labels. These segments featured characters from both original programming and the classic Turner animation library, reimagined by music artists and animators in styles distinct from the original shows.

Between 2000 and 2004, more original series premiered: Sheep in the Big City, Time Squad, Samurai Jack, Grim & Evil (later split into The Grim Adventures of Billy & Mandy and Evil Con Carne), Whatever Happened to... Robot Jones?, Codename: Kids Next Door, Star Wars: Clone Wars, and Megas XLR. On April 1, 2000, Cartoon Network launched a digital cable and satellite channel known as Boomerang, which was spun off from one of their programming blocks that featured retro animated series and shorts, as more original programming and imports from other animated outputs of Time-Warner started to fill the main lineup of Cartoon Network.

On January 11, 2001, Time Warner merged with online service provider America Online (AOL) for $183 billion. Amongst the executive changes created by the merger, Jamie Kellner would replace Ted Turner as the head of Turner Broadcasting System. On June 18, 2001, Betty Cohen, who had served as Cartoon Network's president since its founding, left due to creative disagreements with Kellner. On August 22, 2001, Jim Samples was appointed general manager and Executive Vice President of the network, replacing Cohen. Cartoon Network decided to create an entirely adult-focused block due to earlier success with adult audiences. Adult Swim debuted on September 2, 2001, with an episode of Home Movies; the block initially aired on Sunday nights, with a repeat telecast on Thursdays. The initial lineup consisted of Home Movies, Harvey Birdman, Attorney at Law, Sealab 2021, Cowboy Bebop, The Brak Show, Aqua Teen Hunger Force, and Space Ghost Coast to Coast. Also that year, Warner Bros. Animation absorbed Hanna-Barbera's operations, with Cartoon Network Studios being incorporated as a separate studio as a result.

The first theatrical film based on an original Cartoon Network series, The Powerpuff Girls Movie, was released on July 3, 2002. It received mixed-to-positive reviews but was a commercial failure at the time of its release, grossing $16.4 million worldwide on a budget of $11 million. Cartoon Network and Boomerang would be reorganized, following the replacement of Jamie Kellner by Philip Kent in the role of chief executive officer of Turner, into one individual Animation unit. On October 3, 2003, the Cartoon Cartoon Fridays block was rebooted in a live-action format as "Fridays", hosted by Tommy Snider and Nzinga Blake, the latter of which was replaced by Tara Sands in 2005. It aired episodes of Cartoon Network original series and acquired shows alongside movies and specials.

== 2004–2007: CN City and Yes! eras ==
Cartoon Network's second logo, used from June 14, 2004, to May 28, 2010.

On June 14, 2004, Cartoon Network rebranded, which included an updated logo (retaining the checkerboard motif) and a new slogan, "This is Cartoon Network!" New bumpers and on-air packaging to coincide with this rebrand were produced by Animal Logic, which showed characters interacting in a CGI city built from locations and iconography of various programs. Most classic programming moved to Boomerang to make space for new content, while older originals could be viewed in segments on a half-hour block known as The Cartoon Cartoon Show. In April of that year, Toonami had moved to Saturday evenings, after programs on the block started to contain more material deemed less appropriate for Cartoon Network's core audience. A new programming franchise to fill its original weekday afternoon slot, Miguzi, launched that month.

In August, Cartoon Network premiered Foster's Home for Imaginary Friends, which became the network's most-viewed original series premiere (until Class of 3000 in 2006). Consistently ranking #1 among viewers aged 6–11, the show prompted an order of 26 additional episodes and quickly became a flagship program. Alongside returning series The Grim Adventures of Billy & Mandy, Ed, Edd n Eddy, and Codename: Kids Next Door, it set a high standard for future programming aimed at young audiences. Other original series premiering in the City era were Hi Hi Puffy AmiYumi, The Life and Times of Juniper Lee, My Gym Partner's a Monkey, Ben 10, and Squirrel Boy.

In 2005, Nielsen began recording Adult Swim's viewership separately from CN's, due to varying demographics between the two dayparts. Because of this, Adult Swim came to be promoted as a separate network that shares channel space with Cartoon Network. With Adult Swim now intending half of Cartoon Network's audience, the daytime CN now sought to aim at more younger viewers under Samples, diverging from their original psychographic approach. On August 22, 2005, Cartoon Network launched a block aimed at the preschool demographic known as Tickle-U, which was largely unsuccessful and was discontinued on January 13, 2006. CN would also start the Get Animated initiative in 2005, which encouraged healthy lifestyles towards children.

In October 2005, Cartoon Network launched Sunday Pants, a short-lived anthology series showcasing a mix of animated shorts from various creators and countries, created by on-air creatives Stuart Hill, and Craig Sven-Gordon. It featured 1–3 minute shorts in different styles like hand-drawn, Flash, and CGI, and contained more mature material than most series under the Cartoon Network brand. The show included live-action segments with the band The Slacks and animated transitions by WeFail. Sunday Pants aired for less than a month, ending on October 30, 2005. Plans for a return in 2006 were announced but never happened, and the show was ultimately canceled.

On April 3, 2006, the "Yes!" ad campaign debuted to advertise CN's growing lineup of animated comedy programs. The CN City branding was modified with similar design elements from the campaign. In December 2006, the network's first live-action TV movie Re-Animated premiered, which blended live-action and animation. This movie was intended to launch the network's foray into scripted live-action programming. A proposed new logo with a green long-shadow text design was tested but not adopted. However, Jim Samples resigned from his post on February 9, 2007, following a bomb scare in Boston caused by packages left around the city that were part of an outdoor marketing campaign promoting the film adaptation of the Adult Swim series Aqua Teen Hunger Force.

== 2007–2010: Fall and Noods eras ==
On May 2, 2007, Stuart Snyder was named as the network's president, following the restructuring of Turner's Animation unit to add brands such as GameTap, Super Deluxe, and Adult Swim to become the unified Animation, Young Adults, & Kids Media unit. The network continued to target younger audiences with programming and changes initiated under Samples. The Fridays block was revamped into Fried Dynamite with younger hosts, paired with a Saturday morning lineup known as the Dynamite Action Squad, which was quickly replaced the following year with Har Har Tharsdays. In May and September, the network's broadcast package was changed seasonally for the Summer and Fall seasons, with songs from Cee-Lo Green and The Hives, respectively. However, the Fall package lasted after its intended season until July of next year, while a new look was being developed for the network.

More original series premiered from 2007 to 2008: Out of Jimmy's Head (spin-off of Re-Animated; CN's first live-action series), Chowder, The Marvelous Misadventures of Flapjack, and The Secret Saturdays. Synder intended to expand Cartoon Network's audience to include older viewers, particularly boys aged 9–14, and reduce the network's reliance on comedic animation. Starting in 2008, the strategy led to a rollout of themed programming blocks for comedy, action, and fantasy series, as well as films suitable for family co-viewing. Also announced was a new initiative known as The Cartoonstitute, which aimed to create up to 150 pieces of programming over 20 months. This initiative was led by veteran animators Craig McCracken and Rob Renzetti, who created content for similar development programs in the past. The Cartoonstitute was eventually shuttered after plans for the program grew difficult, and only three shorts — Regular Show, Secret Mountain Fort Awesome, and later Uncle Grandpa — were selected for full series production.

In July 2008, a refreshed branding style featuring "Noods"—blank, rounded figures that transform into characters of Cartoon Network shows—was introduced, as a collaboration with Kidrobot's Tristan Eaton. The bumpers were produced by motion design studio Capacity, animated by Crew972, and intended to be in place temporarily before a more permanent brand image took place. On September 20, 2008, Cartoon Network ended Toonami after its 11-year run to make room for the upcoming You Are Here lineup. From 2008 to 2011, Cartoon Network aired animated shorts that served as interstitials between programs, called Wedgies, which included Big Baby, The Bremen Avenue Experience, Calling Cat-22, Nacho Bear, Roller Squirrels and The Talented Mr. Bixby.

The You Are Here lineup received significant marketing support, anchored by the series premieres of The Secret Saturdays and Star Wars: The Clone Wars. According to Snyder, The Clone Wars aligned well with the network's audience and leveraged strong brand recognition. The series set a new ratings record, surpassing Class of 3000 as the most-watched premiere in Cartoon Network's history. Cartoon Network began greenlighting more projects based on various intellectual properties that appealed to their audience. Notable examples include a Scooby-Doo prequel movie and Firebreather, an adaptation of the graphic novel of the same name. During this time, Cartoon Network increased fan engagement by launching an online community with message boards, game leaderboards, and virtual badges.

2009 was notable in that Cartoon Network didn't premiere any original animated programming. Instead, the network launched CN Real, a block of "alternative" live-action reality shows, after development of scripted live-action shows stalled during the 2007 Writer's Strike. Alongside this, limited sports programming was introduced, including basketball recaps and SlamBall games during commercial breaks. Although scripted programming resumed the following year with the premieres of Tower Prep and Unnatural History, the move to live-action faced criticism from audiences who felt it diverged too far from the network's initial cartoon-centric identity. This, combined with low ratings, resulted in most of the CN Real lineup being removed later in the year, save for Dude, What Would Happen and Destroy Build Destroy.

== 2010–2016: CHECK it era ==
Main version of logo, used since March 22, 2010. It was adapted on television on May 29, 2010.

On March 22, 2010, a new logo for the network was registered with the USPTO. After being unveiled publicly at the network's upfront on April 21, it was introduced on-air on May 29, along with a new brand identity and tagline, "CHECK it". The new logo and branding paid homage to the black and white checkerboard that formed the network's first logo (and was carried over in a minimized form to the second logo), accompanied by various CMYK color variations and patterns. The rebrand was initially developed by Qube Konstrukt, but the channel later switched to Brand New School for the finalized version.

During that year, two original animated shows, Adventure Time and Regular Show premiered to widespread acclaim, and became highly viewed among both older and younger viewers. Cartoon Network would also premiere action series Generator Rex, Ben 10: Ultimate Alien, and Sym-Bionic Titan to similarly positive reception. Despite positive reviews, Tower Prep and Unnatural History struggled with ratings and received demographics outside the network's core audience, leading to their cancellations after one season. The network premiered more live-action projects, such as Level Up and the Annoying Orange TV series, which were directed to align with the network's animated shows. On December 27, 2010, Adult Swim expanded by one hour, moving its start time from 10:00 p.m. to 9:00 p.m. ET. In 2011, Cartoon Network premiered a multitude of series, among those being The Looney Tunes Show, The Amazing World of Gumball, Ninjago (previously known as Ninjago: Masters of Spinjitzu until 2019), and ThunderCats. The network also joined the TV Everywhere model for their website and app, and the following year, introduced a live TV simulcast.

In October 2012, Cartoon Network celebrated its 20th anniversary, airing birthday and party-themed reruns of its shows for every weekend until November 4. Earlier in the year on March 30, 2012, the Cartoon Planet block was revived to air the channel's original programming from the late 1990s through mid-2000s. That same year, Cartoon Network launched Cartoon Network Shorts Department, a successor to the failed Cartoonstitute initiative, to greenlight more comedy animation programs. Additionally, the channel joined the anti-bullying initiative Stop Bullying Speak Up, which was created by its sister channel CNN in 2010. The network aired the documentary Speak Up (with special appearance by then-president Barack Obama) in 2012 and The Bully Effect the following year. On May 20, 2013, Cartoon Network updated its identity, by adding new bumpers, graphics, and sounds. A short animation (formatted as it were a GIF) was created for each show, and these animations were used when featuring the show in Next bumpers. The background used in its promos and bumpers was also changed from black to white. During this year, Cartoon Network would release various animated pilots out of their Cartoon Network Shorts Department program, such as Clarence, Lakewood Plaza Turbo, Steven Universe and Tome of the Unknown. All mentioned were greenlit with Tome of the Unknown turning into Over the Garden Wall and was the first series formatted as a limited miniseries on the network, which was proven a benefit, as each premiere of a new episode of the show grew more viewership.

One of many soundtracks of Cartoon Network's CHECK it 4.0 era, known as Burst.

On March 6, 2014, Stuart Snyder was removed as president and COO of Turner's Animation, Young Adults & Kids Media division after a restructure. On July 16, Christina Miller was named his successor as president and general manager of Cartoon Network, Adult Swim, and Boomerang. At the end of the month, Cartoon Network's 8:00 p.m. hour was given to Adult Swim, causing new episodes of the network's programming to change time slots. On October 21, 2014, Cartoon Network, along with CNN and Boomerang, were taken off-air from US-based TV provider, Dish Network, due to contract disagreements. However, the channels were restored a month later.

== 2016–2020: Dimensional era ==
Under Christina Miller's leadership, Cartoon Network focused on digital growth by launching interactive apps and updating its video-on-demand (VOD) platform to offer features like personalized playlists and early episode access. She prioritized promoting new shows on digital platforms before airing them on TV and aimed to revive classic properties for multi-generational appeal, leading to reboots like the 2016 Ben 10 and The Powerpuff Girls series and ThunderCats Roar. This strategy had begun under her predecessor, who approved earlier revivals such as The Looney Tunes Show and a ThunderCats prequel. The network also experimented with new release formats, including airing new episodes daily over one week.

On May 30, 2016, Cartoon Network refreshed its on-air presentation with a new graphics package based on previous rebrands in the CHECK it family. Known as "Dimensional", the branding was developed by Bent Design Lab and featured various Cartoon Network characters rendered in 3D CGI, stop-motion, and 2D animation. Branding and marketing agency Troika developed the Dimensional style guide, a set of channel-wide standards. On October 22, 2016, AT&T reached a deal to acquire Time Warner for $108.7 billion. The merger was approved by federal regulators on June 12, 2018, and the merger was completed 2 days later, with Time Warner's name changed to WarnerMedia.

To celebrate the network's 25th anniversary, Cartoon Network announced an exhibit called "Cartoon Network: 25 Years of Drawing on Creativity" in partnership with the Paley Center, with showings from September 16. 2017 to October 8, 2017, in their New York City location, and moved to their Beverly Hills, California location with showings from October 14 to November 19 of that year.

On October 29, 2018, Cartoon Network announced construction of its first amusement hotel in Lancaster County, Pennsylvania, which opened on January 10, 2020. On March 4, 2019, AT&T announced a major reorganization of WarnerMedia's Turner Broadcasting division, which involves Cartoon Network, Boomerang, Adult Swim and Turner Classic Movies being transferred to Warner Bros. Entertainment. Although AT&T did not specify any timetable for the changes to take effect, WarnerMedia had begun to remove all Turner references in corporate communications and press releases, referring to that unit's networks as "divisions of WarnerMedia". On November 27, 2019, it was announced that Christina Miller would be leaving WarnerMedia at the end of 2019. Michael Ouweleen served as interim president of Cartoon Network, with Miller helping with the transition. To include their content into the original programming slate of streaming service HBO Max, Cartoon Network would move various programs such as seasons of Summer Camp Island and Infinity Train and shows Tig n' Seek and The Fungies!, which were originally meant for the channel.

== 2020–present: Redraw Your World and Prism eras ==
On April 7, 2020, it was announced that effective July 1, Tom Ascheim would become President of Warner Bros. Global Kids, Young Adults and Classics, overseeing Cartoon Network, Boomerang, Adult Swim, and Turner Classic Movies. In February 2021, Ascheim announced plans to introduce new programming blocks for preschool and family audiences to expand its demographic reach. During the WarnerMedia upfronts, it was announced that the preschool brand Cartoonito would launch in the U.S. via a block on Cartoon Network and a branded hub on HBO Max. Over 20 series were expected to be featured at its launch. Cartoon Network also unveiled a new imaging campaign, "Redraw Your World". Cartoonito launched in September 2021, initially running for 8 hours on weekdays and 2 hours on weekends. Also launched that month was the Sunday evening block ACME Night, which would be dedicated towards family viewing with feature film airings and other. Original animated movies and series were announced for the block, although since then, most have been cancelled or moved to other platforms. On May 17, 2021, AT&T announced an agreement for WarnerMedia to be divested and merge with Discovery Inc., forming Warner Bros. Discovery under CEO David Zaslav. The merger was completed in April 2022. Cartoon Network has faced a number of cutbacks and reorganizations associated with the merger; in May 2022, Ascheim stepped down as president of Warner Bros. Global Kids, Young Adults and Classics, which was subsequently shut down and folded into Warner Bros. Television. The Cartoon Network, Inc. channels would soon be placed under the refined Warner Bros. Discovery U.S. Networks division (succeeding the defunct Turner Broadcasting System).

Michael Ouweleen was then reinstated as president of Cartoon Network and its sister properties, under Kathleen Finch, CEO of the U.S. Networks division. In August 2022, a number of Cartoon Network-originated programs were removed from HBO Max and a few were abruptly cancelled by WBD as part of cost-cutting measures and write-offs of underperforming content, leading to criticism from fans and the animation industry (although they are still available on digital platforms). In October, Cartoon Network Studios merged its development and production operations into Warner Bros. Animation, while continuing to exist as an imprint.

Leading up to its 30th anniversary, Cartoon Network began a month-long "Birthday Bash" campaign: a Labor Day marathon, weeknight blocks, an October 1 marathon, a YouTube live-stream, and complete series releases of Courage, Ed, Edd n Eddy, and Foster's Home on DVD and digital. Following the celebration, Cartoon Network began to phase out the "Redraw Your World" branding in favor of a pastel-colored look, officially referred to as the "prism", a new visual device for the network.

On October 14, 2022, amidst growing uncertainty about the channel's future in the wake of its reorganizations and cutbacks, Cartoon Network took to social media to reaffirm that it would not be shutting down, stating "[we] have been and will always be your home for beloved, innovative cartoons"; the network's Latin American station made a similar post regarding the speculation two weeks later. In a December 2022 interview with Variety, Ouweleen foretold Cartoon Network returning to its initial roots as an "animation network" rather than a "kid network", as well as the possibility of producing more programming that could appeal to both children and young adults.

On March 29, 2023, it was announced that Adult Swim would move its start time from 8:00 p.m. to 7:00 p.m. ET starting on May 1; in justification of the block's expansion, Ouweleen cited ratings data showing that 68% of Cartoon Network's audience between 6:00 to 8:00 p.m. were over the age of 18. In May, it was announced that Adult Swim would further expand to 6:00 p.m. ET in September; in June, it was announced that the new hour would be occupied on weekdays by the sub-block "Checkered Past", which would feature airings of classic Cartoon Network original series. In August 2023, it was announced that the premiere date for Checkered Past had been moved up to August 28, and that Adult Swim would expand by two hours to 5:00 p.m. ET instead, with Checkered Past airing for the first two hours.

In May 2024, a Variety article revealed that Warner Bros. Television's animation labels (Cartoon Network Studios, Hanna-Barbera Studios Europe, and Warner Bros. Animation) would focus more on creating content based on established IPs, tailored to different age group demographics. That month, Adult Swim also announced that Checkered Past would be replaced on Fridays by "Toonami Rewind" beginning May 31, which would feature classic action and anime series. In August 2024, Cartoon Network closed its website to become a redirect to its hub on streaming service Max because of continuous tax write-offs, ending after 26 years of service. Regarding the closure of the network's website, a Cartoon Network spokesperson stated "we are focusing on the Cartoon Network shows and social media where we find consumers are the most engaged and there is a meaningful potential for growth". In the same month, it was announced that Warner Bros. Television chairwoman Channing Dungey would also assume the role of chairwoman for the U.S. networks division. She would be replacing Kathleen Finch, who retired at the end of the year. On December 12, 2024, WBD announced that it would reorganize its assets into two main business units: "Streaming & Studios" and "Global Linear Networks" by mid-2025. This decision was made from the need to separate the company's growing streaming business from its shrinking cable television business in order to reduce debt and grow more revenue. The same month, Max announced that they are shifting more focus to programming meant for adults, as well as content suitable for family co-viewing, placing less emphasis on content exclusively for kids, specifically the Cartoon Network and Cartoonito brands, with all remaining contents from its library set to leave the service by 2026.

On February 13, 2026, Tubi announced the post (via X) with a collection of shows from Cartoon Network, Warner Bros. Animation, and Hanna-Barbera that will be streaming, starting March 1, 2026. It will also be streaming shows in phases throughout the year.

=== Acquisition of Warner Bros. Discovery by Paramount Skydance ===
On December 5, 2025, Netflix announced that it would acquire Warner Bros. Discovery for $72 billion. The deal would contain the Warner Bros. film, video game and television studios, HBO/HBO Max, and DC Entertainment/DC Comics. Cartoon Network, along with the rest of the company's linear networks and Discovery+, would be excluded from the deal, and would be spun off into a separate publicly traded company. Paramount Skydance would later launch a (now rejected) hostile takeover bid for the entirety of WBD three days later for an enterprise value of $108.4 billion.

On December 17, 2025, Starz Entertainment (in which also plans to acquire A+E Global Media, a joint venture between The Walt Disney Company and Hearst Communications) submitted a $25 billion bid to acquire Warner Bros. Discovery's Global Linear Networks division, which includes cable networks and brands such as Cartoon Network along with CNN, TNT, TBS, and the Discovery-owned networks including Discovery Channel, TLC, HGTV, Food Network, and more. However, the Starz deal was rejected, due to Paramount Skydance initiating a definitive agreement to buy WBD on February 27, 2026.

On February 26, 2026, Warner Bros. Discovery confirmed that it considered Paramount's updated bid to be superior to Netflix's current offer, triggering a four-business-day period during which Netflix could improve its offer. Netflix subsequently declined to increase its bid, stating that the deal was "no longer financially attractive." A potential Paramount-WBD merger would most likely bring Cartoon Network under the same umbrella with competitor Nickelodeon, along with their subsidies such as Boomerang, Cartoonito, Nick Jr. and Nicktoons.

On June 6, 2026, Paramount Skydance was willing to divest some major kids' channels, including Cartoon Network in Europe, in exchange of winning an approval of the Paramount-WBD deal for the European Union.

On June 24, 2026, when the European Commission approved the Paramount-WBD deal, Paramount Skydance indicated openness to divesting select children's television assets to secure clearance, potentially including elements of the Cartoon Network brand, its linear channels, production studio, and extensive animated library. Paramount Skydance would set up a bidding war which Netflix, Amazon, Apple, Sony Pictures, and Comcast would bid against each other to buy Cartoon Network. However, the bidding war was called off.

On September 21, 2026, following an announcement of Paramount Skydance's completion of their acquisition of Warner Bros. Discovery, it was announced that Cartoon Network would be brought under common ownership with long-time rival Nickelodeon. On October 6, 2026, the merger closed, making Cartoon Network a subsidiary of the newly formed Skydance.

Several days after the merger, over 200 gigabytes of assets belonging to Cartoon Network and its sister channel Adult Swim leaked to the general public. Referred to as a "gigaleak", similar to the gigaleak that occurred to Nintendo, the leak included promotional and behind the scenes material, puppet rigs and pitch bibles for popular cartoons throughout several decades. Notably, material from Powerpuff Girls Z, an anime spinoff based on The Powerpuff Girls, was also part of the leak. While the show aired in other countries, it was supposed to premiere in the United States in 2007, but was scrapped.

The leak led to online memes, jokes and speculation about the Skydance merger being part of how the leak occurred, users pointing out that Avatar Aang: The Last Airbender had leaked in its entirety after Nickelodeon merged with Skydance. No evidence of Skydance being associated with the leak exists, however.

In November 2026, Skydance announced that Cartoon Network Studios and Williams Street along with sister studios Warner Bros. Animation and Hanna-Barbera Studios Europe would operate in the newly created Skydance Television Animation unit alongside sister studio Nickelodeon Animation Studios. The announcement promoted Michael Ouweleen as the president of the combined division with Peter Girardi and Alec Botnick overseeing content across all four labels.

== Bibliography ==
- Mittell, Jason (2004). Genre and Television: From Cop Shows to Cartoons in American Culture. Routledge. ISBN 978-0-415-96903-1.
- Stabile, Carol A.; Harrison, Mark (2003). Prime Time Animation:Television Animation and American culture. Routledge. ISBN 978-0-415-28326-7. Archived from the original on January 24, 2022.
