= List of presidents of Cartoon Network =

The following are presidents of the American entertainment company The Cartoon Network, Inc. (TCN) which also serve as the company's chief executive officer (CEO) and chief operating officer (COO).

== Betty Cohen (1992–2001) ==
Betty Cohen became the first president, CEO, and COO of The Cartoon Network, Inc. in 1992, a position she held until her resignation in 2001. Cohen had previously worked as the manager of marketing for the Cable Health Network in 1982, and as the director of on-air promotion and interstitial programming for Nickelodeon from 1984 to 1988. Under Cohen's leadership, Cartoon Network became a global phenomenon with asset value of nearly $3 billion. Cohen resigned from her post on June 18, 2001, stating "I was afraid I would die the queen of cartoons." She was succeeded by Jim Samples.

Under Cohen's leadership, network brands such as Toonami, the Cartoon Cartoons, Cartoon Cartoon Fridays, and Cartoon Orbit were introduced, as well as original series such as Space Ghost Coast to Coast, What a Cartoon!, Dexter's Laboratory, Johnny Bravo, Cow and Chicken, The Powerpuff Girls, Ed, Edd n Eddy, and Courage the Cowardly Dog. Dexter's Laboratory, in particular, was one of her favorite animated shows.

== Jim Samples (2001–2007) ==
On August 22, 2001, Jim Samples was promoted to the company's management as Betty Cohen's successor. Under Samples's leadership, the network included successful original series such as Samurai Jack, Codename: Kids Next Door, The Grim Adventures of Billy & Mandy, Star Wars: Clone Wars, Teen Titans, Foster's Home for Imaginary Friends, Camp Lazlo, Ben 10, and Class of 3000. He is also credited with the rollout and launch of Adult Swim, the leading late-night network for young men in the United States, and in 2003, acquired the rights to air reruns of Family Guy and became the anchor for the Adult Swim line-up, which caused 20th Century Fox to revive the show in 2005.

Under Samples's leadership, Cartoon Network also somewhat controversially began airing live-action "cartoon-inspired" movies in 2005, such as The Goonies and Who Framed Roger Rabbit; this move was made in response to Cartoon Network's declining ratings due to competing live-action shows on Nickelodeon and Disney Channel. In 2006, the network produced their first live-action original movie, Re-Animated, a collaboration between live-action and animation. When asked about the project, Samples stated "We think when it's done the 'Cartoon Network' way, kids will enjoy seeing animation and the real world collide." While Cartoon Network intended to produce future shows that blend live-action with animation as well as "cartoony" live-action shows, Samples maintained "we're predominately an animated network and that's not changing anytime soon."

Samples resigned from his post on February 9, 2007, following a bomb scare in Boston caused by packages left around the city that were part of an outdoor marketing campaign promoting the Adult Swim series Aqua Teen Hunger Force. On May 2, Stuart Snyder was named Samples' successor. Samples made the decision "in recognition of the gravity of the situation that occurred under my watch", and with the "hope that my decision allows us to put this chapter behind us and get back to our mission of delivering unrivaled original animated entertainment for consumers of all ages".

== Stuart Snyder (2007–2014) ==
Following Samples's resignation in February 2007, Stuart Snyder was named his successor three months later on May 2, 2007. On September 14, the network's look was revamped, with bumpers and station IDs themed to The Hives song "Fall is Just Something That Grown-Ups Invented." 2007 saw the debut of Out of Jimmy's Head, a spin-off of the movie Re-Animated, and the first live-action Cartoon Network series. 2007 also saw the debut of the series Chowder. In late 2007, The network began broadcasting programs from Canadian channels such as YTV and Teletoon, including George of the Jungle, 6teen, Storm Hawks, League of Super Evil, Chaotic, Bakugan Battle Brawlers, Stoked, and the Total Drama series. Each October from 2007 to 2009, Cartoon Network also aired reruns of the Fox Kids series Goosebumps.

In June 2009, Cartoon Network introduced a block of live-action reality shows called "CN Real", featuring programs such as The Othersiders, Survive This, BrainRush, Destroy Build Destroy, Dude, What Would Happen and Bobb'e Says. The network also aired some limited sports programming, including basketball recaps and Slamball games, during commercial breaks. The lineup was universally panned for being live-action shows on a channel dedicated to cartoons, competing against Nickelodeon and Disney Channel. That year, it also started airing live-action feature films from Warner Bros. and New Line Cinema.

On March 31, 2014, Stuart Snyder was removed as president and COO of Turner's Animation, Young Adults & Kids Media division after a restructure. On July 16, Christina Miller was named his successor as president and general manager of Cartoon Network, Adult Swim, and Boomerang. At the end of the month, Cartoon Network's 8 pm ET/PT primetime hour was given to its night time block Adult Swim, causing new episodes of the network's programming to change timeslots. On October 21, 2014, Cartoon Network, along with CNN and Boomerang, were taken off-air from US-based TV provider, Dish Network, due to contract disagreements. However, the channels were restored a month later.

== Christina Miller (2014–2019) ==
On July 16, 2014, Christina Miller was named as Snyder's successor At the end of the month, Cartoon Network's 8 pm ET/PT primetime hour was given to its night time block Adult Swim, causing new episodes of the network's programming to change timeslots. On October 21, 2014, Cartoon Network, along with CNN and Boomerang, were taken off-air from US-based TV provider, Dish Network, due to contract disagreements. However, the channels were restored a month later.

On November 27, 2019, it was announced that Christina Miller would be leaving WarnerMedia.

== Michael Ouweleen (2019–2020, 2022–present) ==
=== Interim president, CEO, and COO (2019–2020) ===
In 2014, Ouweleen was named CMO of The Cartoon Network, Inc. (Cartoon Network, Adult Swim, and Boomerang) at Turner Broadcasting System. On November 27, 2019, Ouweleen became the interim President, CEO, and COO of The Cartoon Network, Inc. due to the departure of Christina Miller. After Tom Ascheim took over the role on July 1, 2020, Ouweleen became the President of Adult Swim, reporting to Ascheim.

=== Tom Ascheim (2020–2022) ===
Ascheim acted as the president of Freeform until April 2020, when he resigned to take the position of president of Warner Bros. Global Kids, Young Adults and Classics, a division which had oversight over Cartoon Network, Cartoon Network Studios, Warner Bros. Animation and Turner Classic Movies; his first day at the position was July 1. On May 11, 2022, following company-wide reorganizations after the Warner Bros. Discovery merger, Tom Ascheim's role was eliminated.

=== Return to The Cartoon Network, Inc. management ===
Once Ascheim's left following reorganizations of the Warner Bros. Discovery merger, Ouweleen regained his presidential, CEO, and COO roles of The Cartoon Network, Inc. once again on May 11, 2022.

== See also ==
- List of programs broadcast by Cartoon Network
