= Class of 3000 =

2006–2008 American animated TV series for children

- Genre: Musical show Comedy
- Created by: André 3000; Thomas W. Lynch
- Developed by: Patric M. Verrone
- Directed by: Joe Horne
- Voices of: André 3000; Small Fire; Tom Kenny; Jennifer Hale; Crystal Scales; Phil LaMarr; Janice Kawaye; Jeff Bennett
- Theme music composer: André "3000" Benjamin
- Opening theme: "Class of 3000", written by André "3000" Benjamin and Kevin Kendrick
- Composers: André "3000" Benjamin (original songs); Pat Irwin (music scores)
- Country of origin: United States
- Original language: English
- No. of seasons: 2
- No. of episodes: 28 (2 unaired)

Production
- Executive producers: Brian A. Miller; Thomas W. Lynch; André Benjamin
- Producer: Kelly Crews
- Running time: 22 minutes
- Production companies: Tom Lynch Company; Moxie Turtle; Cartoon Network Studios

Original release
- Network: Cartoon Network
- Release: November 3, 2006 – May 25, 2008

Class of 3000 is an American animated children's musical television series created by André 3000 (best known as a member of the hip hop duo Outkast) and Thomas W. Lynch for Cartoon Network. Produced by Tom Lynch Company and Moxie Turtle for Cartoon Network Studios, the series follows superstar and music teacher Sunny Bridges (voiced by André), who teaches a group of students at Atlanta, Georgia's Westley School of the Performing Arts. Bridges is a jazz and blues artist who occasionally lectures in Atlanta's Little Five Points residential area. (Referencing Atlanta, both OutKast and Cartoon Network are based in Atlanta.) Twenty-eight episodes were produced. The show debuted shortly after the hip-hop duo's breakup.

Class of 3000 is the final Cartoon Network original series to premiere when Jim Samples was Cartoon Network's General Manager and Executive Vice President, as he later resigned following the 2007 Boston Mooninite panic. The series has never been rerun.

== Characters ==
=== Main ===
- Sunny Bridges (Full name: André "Sunny" Benjamin Bridges, voiced by André 3000) is the hometown hero of Lil' D. He is a jazz crooner who quit to be a tutor.
- Lil' D (voiced by Sylvia "Small Fire" Holloway) is the unofficial/bumbling leader of the Westley School's music class. He is bright, talented, confident to a fault, and is incredibly tenacious when it comes to music. His instrument is the drums.
- Madison Spaghettini Papadopoulus (voiced by Jennifer Hale) is an extremely optimistic flower child. She is perpetually cheerful, no matter the circumstance, though she is occasionally shown to reach a breaking point. Her instruments are the violin and the cello.
- Tamika Jones (voiced by Crystal Scales) is a student who is stubborn; the slightest misstep is grounds for a threatening fist. Her instruments are the guitar and the harp.
- Edward "Eddie" Phillip James Lawrence III (voiced by Tom Kenny) is the richest kid in the school, being the heir to the Lawrence fortune (according to the first episode, his father is the head of the Earth division of Cola-Cola). His instruments are the trumpet and the clarinet. He has a crush on Tamika.
- Phillip "Philly" P. Phil (voiced by Phil LaMarr) is a brilliant and imaginative student who tends to stand out for his unusual fashion sense. He can invent useful devices on the spot, although they often end in malfunction. His instruments are the double bass and the bass guitar.
- Kim Chin (voiced by Janice Kawaye) is Kam's twin sister and his polar opposite down to even these instruments. She and Kam are the youngest of the Westley Side School First Years. Besides being a DJ, her instrument is the xylophone, also with other percussion instruments.
- Kam Chin (voiced by Janice Kawaye) is Kim's twin brother and her polar opposite, born in Columbus, Ohio and is of Chinese American descent. He and his sister are the youngest of the Westley Side School First Years and he is considered to be the smartest in school. His instruments are the keyboard and the piano.

=== Other ===
- Principal Luna (voiced by Jeff Bennett) is the principal at Westley School of Performing Arts. He is of Hispanic descent and Sunny's rival.
- Cheddar Man (voiced by Phil LaMarr) is one of Sunny's friends. He specialises in selling cheeses, fixing helicopters, doing teeth, and being a Con Artist.
- Mila Lopez (voiced by Jennifer Hale) is a teacher at Westley. She has a crush on Sunny while Sunny has love interest in her. Leela teaches the Westley modern dance class.
- Petunia Squatenchowder (voiced by Tom Kenny) is a lunch lady at Westley's known for serving the grossest lunches. Principal Luna has a crush on her but she has developed a crush on Sunny also.
- Jannet "Jan" Rongeteis (voiced by Jeff Glen Bennett) is a Swedish janitor at Westley. He is a former member of Sunny Funkaneers. Jan is always the one who has to clean up all the messes.
- Bob Sulu (voiced by Jeff Glen Bennett) is the Korean-American butler of Eddie's family mansion and is a typical "English butler". He looks slim at first, but actually has a very muscular body.
- Bianca Moon (voiced by Jennifer Hale) is one of Sunny's friends who owns an organic food store.

== Production ==
While on a trip to Turner Broadcasting in Atlanta to pitch projects, Thomas Lynch met with vice president of programming for Cartoon Network Mike Lazzo, an old friend of his. Lynch told him he wanted to make an animated series with music, and Lazzo said he had a pilot.

While discussing ideas, the two realized their shared fondness for Outkast's album Speakerboxxx/The Love Below and contacted André 3000 to turn his The Love Below into an animated show for Adult Swim. André however was uninterested in the idea and instead proposed coming up with an original concept. Wanting to avoid the show becoming "a licensing deal" and turning into Hammerman or Jackson 5ive, André decided to become directly involved with development. His only stipulation was that the show must be set in Atlanta, as no cartoon prior had been set in the city and he wanted to showcase its culture to a wider audience.

Unsure of where to take the project, André and Lazzo visited André's childhood neighborhood Bankhead and then where he enrolled at Sutton Middle School on the other side of town in the wealthy Buckhead area.

André started talking about his youth ... It was two completely different worlds. His mom insisted he get a great education, so she got his transportation arranged. As I'm listening to all this I'm thinking, 'André, this is the show I want to see.'

— Mike Lazzo

Development of the series lasted two and a half years. 2D animation veteran Joe Horne was attached as director. As neither Lynch or André had experience in the animation industry, Lynch told Horne he would have to "teach [us]". Lynch admitted to "making every mistake anybody could make" for his first animated project.

I think my worst [mistake] was when the cut came back [from overseas animation]. I looked at it and said, Okay, I have some rewrites. They said, "Uhhh, you get some retakes." I had thought retakes meant whole scenes, but it was only moments or close-ups. That was an education right there, because in live-action I rewrite all the way through post-production, I change everything all the time.

— Thomas Lynch

The main characters were inspired by people André knew as a child. He related how on one occasion he was telling stories from his childhood to Lynch, who responded "Oh, that's it! There's a character right there." Diversity was an important element from André's experience that he wanted to incorporate as well: "I'm in school with the mayors kids, my friends were East Indian, people from France. I was getting all kinds of influences and I thought it would be cool to have these different types of characters, different nationalities coming together as music." André also wanted to use the show to highlight music programs, which he lamented were being removed from schools in the United States at the time. Inspiration for the series' premise came from Dead Poets Society.

One of my favorite movies is Dead Poets Society, and I felt like doing that with kids. I also thought it’d be great to have this teacher teach kids in an unorthodox way, so I stepped in as the teacher, Sunny Bridges.

— André 3000

Sunny Bridges' character was inspired by Sonny Rollins, who became well known for taking a hiatus from performing live concerts to practice under the Williamsburg Bridge. By this point, the series had shifted from being "dark and sexy" to "a regular type of show" according to Lynch. In light of this direction, Michael Ouweleen suggested moving it to a primetime slot on Cartoon Network, which they agreed to.

The series was planned to begin featuring guest musicians after several seasons, including Big Boi, Gwen Stefani, Pharrell or Snoop Dogg among others.

=== Art direction ===
Lynch and André were familiar with Cartoon Network's other series, like Hi Hi Puffy AmiYumi, and wanted to give the show "a flowy kind of look" in contrast to their more "boxy and squarey" style. The pair struggled to find the right character designer, which they attributed to them being "very focused on what we want, but we didn't [speak] their language. They had to interpret what we were asking for." André wanted the characters to look "cool and original" and have "a lyricism, a movement and body style almost like musical notes." Eighteen designers in total were brought in to draw the main characters before David Colman was selected.

Valerio Ventura, who worked on visual development for Disney movies like The Rescuers Down Under, served as supervising art director. Ventura was also responsible for painting the show's "jazzy spotted backgrounds" as described by Animation World Network, which, according to Lynch, "he put the (not-quite) finished art on a table, and ... literally threw paint across them Jackson Pollock-style".

Each episode of the series contains an original song with an accompanying animated music video, which André likened to "mini-Fantasias". The music videos are directed by guest animators and feature styles different from the rest of the show. Artists "were given free reign [sic]" and "staying on model was strictly optional" according to Lynch. Several artists who directed music videos include John Kricfalusi, Bill Sienkiewicz, Kyle Baker, Jorge Gutiérrez, Peter Chung and Charlie Bean.

=== Cast ===
The series features several veteran voice actors for the main cast, including Tom Kenny (Eddie), Phil LaMarr (Philly Phil), Jennifer Hale (Madison), Janice Kawaye (Kim and Kam) and Jeff Bennett (Principal Luna). André described his first recording session with the other actors as "intimidat[ing]" until they helped coach him and "become a little more whimsical and magical". The leading role of Lil' D was given to "Small Fire", a local Atlanta comedian who grew up in André's neighborhood and was "the local tomboy [who] would beat us in basketball." He had her in mind for the role from the beginning and finding her was "relatively simple"; his mom went over to her mom's house and asked where she was.

=== Cancellation ===
Class of 3000 was cancelled in December 2007 partially due to budget constraints. Mike Lazzo noted the show was a victim in a change of leadership at Cartoon Network, which began earlier that year after the resignation of Jim Samples over the 2007 Boston Mooninite panic. Class of 3000 was also the final show Lazzo greenlit before he left Cartoon Network to become senior executive vice president of Adult Swim.

According to show character designer David Colman, low ratings relative to the show's high budget and scheduling conflicts over André struggling to submit his songs by the deadline were contributing factors.

== Episodes ==
=== Series overview ===
Season	Episodes		Originally released	
Season	Episodes		First released	Last released
1	13		November 3, 2006	April 20, 2007
2	15	13	June 7, 2007	May 25, 2008
2	15	2	Unaired	

=== Season 1 (2006–07) ===
No. overall	No. in season	Title	Written by	Storyboarded by	Original release date	Prod. code
1–2	1–2	"Home"	Patric M. Verrone; Thomas W. Lynch and André Benjamin (story)	Mike Bell, Don Dougherty, Kirk Hanson, Doug McCarthy, Sebastian Montes and Rossen Varbanov	November 3, 2006	101–102
Lil' D's heart is broken and his faith is shaken when his musical idol, Sunny Bridges, and his music teacher both go missing on the same day. Joined by his fellow student music prodigies, Li'l D decides to have a benefit concert to raise money for a new music teacher, but is unable to sell tickets. Lil' D runs into Sunny, who has quit the music business and returned to Atlanta to lay low. Lil'D and his incredulous classmates set out to convince Sunny to play at their benefit concert. Sunny rejects this proposition, but when he hears the kids play, he realizes that though he may want out of the music business, he doesn't want out of the music. He helps the kids with their concert and then agrees to become their music teacher. Songs: "Life Without Music" and "Throwdown"
3	3	"Peanuts! Get Yer Peanuts"	Richard NC Portofino	Kirk Hanson and Chuck Klein	November 10, 2006	103
Sunny's first lesson teaches the kids to be musically and artistically free. When Principal Luna gives Sunny an overwhelming number of teacherly duties, including being responsible for the annual Peanut Pageant, Sunny instructs his students to use their newfound "artistic freedom" to do a production that's so free that it's a free-for-all. Song: "Oh, Peanuts"
4	4	"Funky Monkey"	Ed Lee	Dave Schwartz and Scooter Tidwell	November 17, 2006	105
The Class of 3000 tries to get involved with the upperclassmen's upcoming production of "The Kong and I," but the smug higher-level students give them demeaning jobs. Li'l D, tasked with shooting gorilla footage for the actor playing Kong, heads to the zoo and discovers a gigantic ape named Momo with a talent for playing the drums. The director wants Momo to play Kong, so Li'l D leverages his connection with the gorilla to gain a starring role in the show. But when Momo seems depressed by his captivity, Li'l D must make a choice between stealing the spotlight and helping his new friend. Song: "Banana Zoo"
5	5	"The Hunt for Red Blobtober"	Michael J. Prescott	Doug McCarthy and Rossen Varbanov	November 24, 2006	106
At a flea market, the Westley kids discover Sunny's senior yearbook from his time at Westley, which has a treasure map drawn on a loose page. A series of coincidences leads the group to believe that Sunny is a pirate, and they follow the map to discover the supposed riches (and meet some of their teacher's old bandmates along the way). When the "treasure" turns out to be a monstrous blob monster Sunny and his senior year band accidentally created from a mixture of Sloppy Joe meat and toxic waste, the kids learn that you can't run away from your mistakes, and use classic funk to banish the blobby beast. Song: "Fight the Blob"
6	6	"Eddie's Money"	Vince Cheung and Ben Montanio	Kirk Hanson and Dan Haskett	December 1, 2006	107
Sunny tries to teach the class how to play and sing the blues, but Eddie can't figure out how, as he's never wanted for or desired anything in his life due to his riches. His lack of appreciation for material things only becomes clearer when his parents throw him a massive birthday party that he tires of almost immediately. Sunny gifts him with a compass that he claims will send him to the greatest present of all, and Eddie and Li'l D embark on a quest through Atlanta to find it--and discover how to appreciate what you have. Meanwhile, the other kids try to trick Eddie's staff into believing the birthday boy is still at the mansion so the festivities can continue. Song: "Richer Shade of Blue"
7	7	"The Devil and Li'l D"	Meghan McCarthy	Mike Bell and Dave Schwartz	December 15, 2006	104
At a career fair, some strange, snake-like men try to get Sunny to sign a recording contract with Soul Stack Records; he declines, but Li'l D jumps at the chance. After meeting "Big D" (who is suspiciously Satanic), Li'l D joins Soul Stack and slowly loses his artistic integrity and sense of self as he becomes a pitchman for "Extreme Ham," hawking the product rather than actually making music. When his friends help him realize just how far he's fallen, he begs Sunny for help in voiding the contract. A series of challenges against Big D fails, and Sunny decides to sacrifice himself to save Li'l D's own soul...but the star has a trick up his sleeve that will get them both out of the deal. Song: "All We Want is Your Soul"
8	8	"Brotha from the Third Rock"	David Wyatt	Lenord Robinson and Dave Schwartz	January 26, 2007	108
Philly Phil's efforts to convince the kids that alien life exists send him on a mission into space. Returning almost immediately to Earth, he is captured and taken to Roswell, Georgia where he is mistaken by the government for an alien. Sunny and the kids take it upon themselves to save Philly Phil from his captors. Song: "UFO Ninja"
9	9	"Westley Side Story"	Ed Lee	Sebastian Montes and Scooter Tidwell	February 2, 2007	109
Kim and Kam have to face their sibling rivalry, while Sunny encounters his rival from Eastley, who has his own class who are basically evil twins of Sunny's. Song: "Kim Kam Jam"
10	10	"Love Is in the Hair...Net"	Meghan McCarthy	Kevin Altieri and Dave Schwartz	February 9, 2007	110
Madison's hair is exceptionally frizzy, which she announces is a sign that love is in the air. She is correct: Sunny and Miss Lopez have crushes on each other, while Principal Luna becomes smitten with Petunia Squattenchowder, the new lunch lady. Luna asks Sunny for help in writing a song to declare his feelings, but when Madison discovers a draft, she mistakenly believes that the music teacher loves Miss Squattenchowder. Her attempts to set the pair up on a date creates an increasingly complicated love quadrangle that eventually involves a dance battle, kitchen utensils, and a bomb hidden inside a giant meatball. Song: "Luna Love"
11	11	"Am I Blue?"	Alison Taylor	Sebastian Montes and Lenord Robinson	February 16, 2007	111
Preparing for a nerve-wracking all-school performance, Philly Phil's latest invention goes haywire and turns the kids (except Eddie) blue. After they perform well and become big hits, they attribute their stardom to their blue color and not their talent. Avoiding practice in favor of being 'stars', trouble sets in when the color fades and Philly Phil's machine breaks down after the Westley kids have learned their lesson. Song: "Crayon"
12	12	"Prank Yankers"	Maiya Williams	Dan Haskett and Cindy Morrow	February 23, 2007	112
Tamika gets suspended after she gets framed for a prank her popular friends did. So, she gets her revenge by making them get caught in another prank. Song: "Cool Kitty"
13	13	"Mini Mentors"	Vince Cheung and Ben Montanio	Cindy Morrow and Dave Schwartz	April 20, 2007	113
Sunny encounters a mad scientist named Dr. Nefario who tries to destroy him, while he also sets up a concert dedicated to his old mentor, who he believes has no faith in him, after their original Student-Teacher relation. Song: "My Mentor"

=== Season 2 (2007–08) ===
No. overall	No. in season	Title	Written by	Storyboarded by	Original release date	Prod. code
14	1	"Too Cool for School"	John Tchernev	Cindy Morrow and Dan Haskett	June 7, 2007	201
After an exciting field trip, the kids talk about how much more exciting school is with Sunny around. The trip is followed by an extremely boring science lecture, and Kim makes an assumption--if a celebrity like Sunny made music more fun, than surely other stars could improve the remaining subjects at the school. The scheme works, and Westley becomes the latest trend, with celebrities taking over every class. It's fun at first, but the student body soon discovers that the stars don't really care about them. To make matters worse, the real teachers are all fired, and Sunny quits to join his fellow educators. Kim realizes that it's up to her to fix her mistake and bring things back to normal. Song: "On the Farm" Note: This episode was dedicated to Myrna 'Peach' Crenshaw, a collaborator of Outkast, who died of breast cancer two months before the episode aired.
15	2	"Nothin' to It but to Do It"	Meghan McCarthy	Ken Boyer and Bob McKnight	June 14, 2007	202
When Sunny is forced to go on a bonding retreat with the rest of the school staff, he strikes a deal with Li'l D: if the kids do his chores, he'll let them use his recording studio. A cocky Li'l D throws away the directions Sunny gives him regarding the tasks, and pairs the other students up to handle the seemingly simple list: feeding the fish, watering the plants, and washing clothes. But Sunny's gigantic house is far from normal, and the lack of instructions soon has Tamika and Madison battling a horde of angry aquatic life, Eddie and Kam fending off sentient plants, and Philly Phil and Kim being attacked by living laundry. Meanwhile, the supposedly restful retreat is hampered by Principal Luna, so Sunny develops a scheme to get him out of the way and earn himself and the other teachers some real relaxation. Song: "Clean Up"
16	3	"Free Philly"	Ed Lee	Kevin Altieri and Julian Chaney	June 21, 2007	203
After costing his class the chance at winning various awards during Field Day, Philly Phil feels disheartened that he can't be as "normal" as his classmates. At the urging of one of his inventions, Philly Phil leaves for a science institution, much to the dismay of everyone else. Song: "Philly Phil Come Home" Note: The title is a parody of Free Willy.
17	4	"Tamika and the Beast"	Dave Polsky	Cindy Morrow and Dan Haskett	June 28, 2007	204
"The Beast", an eighth grader who's the stuff of the legends, causes a stir when he charms Tamika and is suspected of vandalizing the school. Song: "Drum Off" Note: The title is the parody of Beauty and the Beast.
18	5	"Safety Last"	Ed Lee	Ken Boyer and Bob McKnight	July 5, 2007	205
Eddie is to star in a Rapunzel play with Tamika, but after the Westley auditorim collapses, his parents are concerned with his safety and make major changes to the script. Song: "Rapunzel"
19	6	"Study Buddies"	John Tchernev	Julian Chaney and Sebastian Montes	July 12, 2007	206
When Li'l D is forbidden to go on a field trip for failing an exam, he and Sunny become study buddies. Song: "Study Buddies"
20	7	"The Cure"	Meghan McCarthy	Dan Haskett, Jeff Mednikow and Cindy Morrow	August 31, 2007	207
Sunny catches a cold on the day before he's supposed to model at Kim's fashion show to save the rain forest, so the kids try to cure him. While Sunny is out, Principal Luna looks to get the opportunity to steal the spotlight from him. Song: "Do your Pose"
21–22	8–9	"The Class of 3000 Christmas Special"	Meghan McCarthy	Kevin Altieri, Kyle Baker, Barry Caldwell, Dan Haskett, Sebastian Montes and Scooter Tidwell	November 30, 2007	208–209
Li'l D tries to get off of Santa's naughty list just in time for Christmas. Songs: "Gimmie Toys!", "Santa's in Trouble", and "Christmas Is Being Here Together"
23	10	"Big Robot on Campus"	Dave Polsky	Ken Boyer, Bob McKnight and Jeff Mednikow	December 14, 2007	210
Philly Phil invents a robot named B.R.O.C (Big Robot on Campus) to help him be popular, but it gets a little out of hand. Song: "Turn of the Century"
24	11	"Take a Hike!"	David Wyatt	Kevin Altieri and Julian Chaney	December 14, 2007	211
Madison and Tamika get separated from the class during a camping trip. Song: "Beauty and the Beat"
25	12	"You Ain't Seen Nothin' Yeti"	Martin Pope	Dan Haskett and Cindy Morrow	May 25, 2008	212
A local news station is offering a $500 reward for a picture of a Yeti rumored to be residing in Atlanta. Li'l D quickly discovers the creature is at Sunny's house. However, he makes him promise not to expose him because he had saved his life once. But when Li'l D notices the Yeti is beginning to take advantage of Sunny to the point of his being exhausted, he pulls off a scheme with the other kids to get rid of the creature without breaking his promise to Sunny. Song: "In Search of"
26	13	"Vote Sunny"	Randi Barnes	Ken Boyer, Jerome Eisenberg and Robert McKnight	May 25, 2008	213
The students intensely campaign Sunny to get him Nominated for Atlanta's Teacher of the Year. However, only one can go with him to the awards dinner. So he organizes a "musical septathlon" to determine who goes with him. However, the end result is a tie and Sunny and the kids decide no one will go with him. How will the kids live with it!? Song: "Teacher of the Year"
27	14	"Kam Inc."	Ed Lee and Dave Polsky	Kevin Altieri, Julian Chaney and Scott Shaw	Unaired	214
Kam and Eddie gain a rivalry over a girl named Zelda, so they created their own company (selling cases with their face on them). But it goes out of hand. Song: "Treasure"
28	15	"Two to Tango"	Dan Fiebel and Rich Rinaldi	Dan Haskett, Jeff Mednikow and Cindy Morrow	Unaired	215
When Sunny and Lopez fight after their respective classes pull multiple pranks on each other, things go wrong and this has an effect on the two. So, both classes must figure out a way for Sunny and Lopez to get over their hatred for each other. Song: "Two to Tango"

== Music ==
Every episode of the show features at least one original song performed by the characters, which were written to fit the story.

André 3000 listed Peanuts and Fat Albert and the Cosby Kids as inspirations for the show's musical style, saying:

I watched Peanuts growing up, and the music was always strong. Vince Guaraldi, a great jazz artist, was doing all the music for Peanuts. And at the time ... Fat Albert and the Cosby Kids had music involved. So I was really looking for a vehicle to do music. I thought it'd be dope for kids to hear something different than what they hear every day. I wanted to expose them to different sounds, and instruments they might not be hearing … on the radio.

While recording a song, André would lay reference tracks by saying/singing lines meant for the children characters in the show before sending it to Cartoon Network for the actors to replace. André noted the difficulty of this, saying: "I'd have to change my voice to act like a kid, had to think like a kid, and that was the hardest learning curve musically. I knew I wanted to introduce kids to certain instruments and keep it upbeat. But it was a challenge to bring my inner kid out."

Regarding the show's background music, André wanted it to have an "Atlanta/southern vibe", and selected The B-52's member Pat Irwin to oversee it.

=== CD track list ===
A CD featuring songs from the first season of the show was released on July 3, 2007 via LaFace Records.

No.	Title
1	"Class of 3000 Theme Song"
2	"Life Without Music" ("Home")
3	"Throwdown" ("Home")
4	"Oh, Peanut" ("Peanuts! Get Yer Peanuts!")
5	"We Want Your Soul" ("The Devil and Li'l D")
6	"Banana Zoo" ("Funky Monkey")
7	"A Rich Shade of Blue" ("Eddie's Money")
8	"Fight the Blob" ("The Hunt for Red Blobtober")
9	"UFO Ninja" ("Brotha from the Third Rock")
10	"Kim-Kam Jam" ("Westley Side Story")
11	"Luna Love" ("Love Is in the Hair...Net")
12	"The Crayon Song" ("Am I Blue?")
13	"My Mentor" ("Mini Mentors")
14	"Cool Kitty" ("Prank Yankers")

== Broadcast and release ==
The series made its world premiere (previously advertised as a live premiere with performances by Chris Brown) on November 3, 2006 at 8:00 p.m. ET/PT with a one-hour special. It was Cartoon Network's highest rated premiere since Foster's Home for Imaginary Friends in 2004 and ranked #1 in all of television for boys 2-11 and boys 6-11. It later premiered on Cartoon Network UK on May 28, 2007, Cartoon Network Australia/New Zealand on February 4, 2008 and Cartoon Network Asia on February 10, 2008.

Although there have been no home video releases in Region 1, the show is available on Google Play, with the exception of "The Cure" from season two.

=== Home media ===
A DVD of the first season was released on April 17, 2008, in Region 4. Plus, in the UK, 3 episodes from the series were placed on a DVD.

== Reception ==
The show received mostly positive reviews. The New York Times called it "an eclectic, speedy and fun-enough cartoon that combines styles from anime, shimmying iPod ads and the merrily slapdash work of Filmation in the 1970s." Regarding André 3000's influence, they said "[his] energizing music combines funk and crunk and every other style, knows from cacophony, and the show... is kept under control with witty, pointed dialogue and kid-friendly punch lines about, say, Clay Aiken or Big Pharma." The Boston Globe also described the series as "both sweetly innocent and urban contemporary" and that it "offers music as something spiritual and celebratory and not to be made just for money". Emily Ashby of Common Sense Media gave the series four out of five stars, saying: "Class of 3000 offers a rich cast of diverse characters, colorful animation, and fun (if sometimes somewhat far-fetched) storylines. ... In addition to his creative responsibilities, Benjamin also contributes original songs and music videos to each episode (a tie-in album is available) -- the entire package may just leave your kids with a renewed interest in music."

"Eddie's Money" won a Primetime Emmy for Outstanding Individual Achievement in Animation.

The soundtrack is rated 4.5 stars out of 5 on Amazon.

=== Future ===
In November 2024, André 3000 expressed interest in reviving the series during an interview at Camp Flog Gnaw festival, which stems from a phone conversation with Tyler, The Creator. Stating "[In] my very first conversation with Tyler, he said: 'I know all the songs from Class of 3000.' Tyler knows music, man, We're hoping to do something new with it, in some type of way, So yeah, stay tuned."

== In other media ==
- Sunny Bridges made a cameo appearance during the end credits of Codename: Kids Next Door and The Grim Adventures of Billy & Mandy crossover episode "The Grim Adventures of the KND".
- Sunny Bridges makes a cameo in the OK K.O.! Let's Be Heroes final episode "Thank You for Watching the Show".
