= CartoonNetwork.com =

Former official website of Cartoon Network

- Website type: Games and Video Website
- Founded: 1998
- Dissolved: 2024
- Successor: HBO Max
- Owner: Cartoon Network

CartoonNetwork.com was Cartoon Network's official website, active from 1998 to 2024. Throughout its existence, it housed games, minisites for its shows, an online store (Cartoon Network Shop), and, in the past, Web Premiere Toons and Cartoon Orbit. The website changed its format several times since its inception, and shut down in 2024, since then, it redirects to Cartoon Network hub on HBO Max.

== History ==
=== Early years ===
Cartoon Network registered its official website, CartoonNetwork.com, on January 9, 1996. It officially launched on July 27, 1998; simultaneously, its existing AOL channel that had been in operation since 1996 was upgraded. Sam Register served as Cartoon Network Online's senior vice president and creative director from 1997 to 2001, and Rob Sorcher served as executive vice president and head of Cartoon Network Online. In its early years, small studios partnered with the network to produce exclusive "Web Premiere Toons", short cartoons made specifically for CartoonNetwork.com. More about animation was included in the "Department of Cartoons", which featured storyboards, episode guides, backgrounds, sound and video files, model sheets, production notes, and other information about shows on the network. In January 1999, the Department of Cartoons showcased the "MGM Golden Age Collection", most of which had not been published or even seen in more than 50 years. Among the earliest exclusives were a special The Flintstones-themed minisite tied in with a week-long event celebrating the best episodes of the series in August 1998, a Scooby-Doo minisite for October that year and never-before seen artwork of MGM's animation from January 18, 1999, which was inserted in the Department of Cartoons for a week.

Cartoon Network launched Cartoon Orbit, an online gaming network characterized by digital trading cards called "cToons", in October 2000. The game officially ended on October 16, 2006.

In October 2000, CartoonNetwork.com outdid its rival Nickelodeon's website in terms of unique users, scoring 2.12 million compared to Nick.com's 1.95 million. The website by 2001 was beginning to converge with the linear channel, owing largely to Cartoon Network developing the website on its end, rather than using a subsidiary like its competitors. Toonami also started to make good use of the website from September 18, 2000, with its Total Immersion Events.

=== 2002 reface ===
Cartoon Network did a major reface to its website in July 2002, dividing the site into four core categories: Play, Watch, Orbit and Shop. On the week of its relaunch, the site had a record 105 million visits. October saw the release of Trick-or-Treat Beat, part of the Trick-or-Treat for UNICEF fund-raising campaign, featuring several Cartoon Network characters. The website hosted next-day repeats of Star Wars: Clone Wars upon its premiere in October 2003.

=== 2004 reface ===
The 2004 reface of the website saw it move away from the previous HTML-friendly layout and adopt one predominantly using Flash. As of year-end 2004, the website hosted over 110 free online games and 12 paid PowerPlay Games. That year saw a record 1.6 billion game plays.

2006 saw the introduction of Toonami Jetstream with Viz Media and Cartoon Network Video for its comedy titles. Battle Arena, based on the Ben 10 series, was the first to use PlayStation 3's browser. That year, the total number of game plays surpassed the 2 billion mark.

In July 2007, Nielsen ratings data showed visitors spent an average of 77 minutes on the site, surpassing the previous record of 71 minutes set in 2004, and the site ranked 26th in terms of time spent for all US domains.

=== Shutdown ===
On August 8, 2024, CartoonNetwork.com was closed down and was redirected to the Cartoon Network channel hub of the streaming service Max. Regarding the closure of the network's website, a Cartoon Network spokesperson stated "we are focusing on the Cartoon Network shows and social media where we find consumers are the most engaged and there is a meaningful potential for growth". Gizmodo reported that this shutdown not only removes "an archive of clips" and "free access to series" but also the website "hosted years of beloved flash games relating to its shows. While many have been erased over the years through various site redesigns–and archived elsewhere for nostalgic fans–at least some of the current archives are still accessible via international versions of the Cartoon Network website in regions where Max is currently unavailable".

== CartoonNetworkYA.com ==
CartoonNetworkYA.com was a Spanish-language translation of the main website, carting the US Hispanic audience. Exclusive content was limited, one of these actions included the hypothesis of releasing the El Santo series in 2007, with the signing of an agreement in April that year.

== Cartoon Network Video ==
Cartoon Network Video was an advertising-supported website that existed between 2006 and 2012. By 2007, it had amassed a weekly average of 2.2 million streams since launch. A mobile app was released on December 17, 2010.
