= The Othersiders =

American television series

- Genre: Paranormal; Reality
- Written by: Zig Gauthier
- Directed by: Casey Brumels
- No. of seasons: 2
- No. of episodes: 23

Production
- Executive producers: Zig Gauthier; Casey Brumels; Rafael Garcia; Brad Kuhlman
- Producer: Rob Swartz
- Production companies: Red Varden Studios; Ping Pong Productions

Original release
- Network: Cartoon Network
- Release: June 17 – October 30, 2009

The Othersiders is an American paranormal reality television series that premiered on June 17, 2009 on Cartoon Network. The program follows a group of five teenagers who are interested in the paranormal and explore reportedly haunted sites to discover any evidence of ghosts. Aimed for a teen audience, it had a similar concept as Ghost Hunters. In June 2009, the series was a part of Cartoon Network's CN Real programming block. The second season of The Othersiders premiered on October 7, 2009 and ended on October 30, 2009.

== Team members ==
- Riley Litman – lead investigator: the one who supplies the staff
- KC Costonis – case manager: the person who decides the place they go to
- Sam Hirsch – group webmaster: posts the videos and info they learned from them going to the place
- Zack Burke – tech manager: supplies the staff with the technology
- Jackie Zhao – researcher: the one who gets info on where they go

== Series overview ==
Season	Episodes	Originally released	
Season	Episodes	First released	Last released
1	11	June 17, 2009	August 26, 2009
2	12	October 7, 2009	October 30, 2009

== Episodes ==
=== Season 1 (2009) ===
No. overall	No. in season	Title	Location(s)	Original release date	Prod. code
1	1	"Lincoln Heights Jail"	Los Angeles, California, US	June 17, 2009	101
The team investigates the abandoned Lincoln Heights Jail. Paranormal evidence: A moving chair, an orb, someone saying "Sereno has it..." and a mysterious moving glowing figure. Verdict: All the investigators considered the place haunted.
2	2	"Queen Mary"	Long Beach, California, US	June 24, 2009	102
The team investigates the RMS Queen Mary, the '30s last ocean liner in the world. Paranormal evidence: A flash in the engine room, a hotspot, shadows in the pool room, the voice of a young Jackie singing, someone demonically yelling "GET OUT" and only KC and Sam hearing engines turning on. Verdict: All the investigators considered the place haunted.
3	3	"Mojave Airport Boneyard"	Mojave, California, US	July 1, 2009	103
The team investigates Mojave Airport Boneyard. Paranormal Evidence: The noise of a plane crash, a camera falling on its own, an orb appearing on one of their photos, a flashing light, the cargo door opening and closing on its own and a faint figure. Verdict: Everyone except KC thought this place was not haunted.
4	4	"Morey Mansion"	Redlands, California, US	July 8, 2009	104
The team investigates the Morey mansion. Paranormal Evidence: Warm S.M. initials in the mirror, a moving orb in billiards room, a locked door suddenly being open, a hotspot on the rails, a working fan without plugs and Jackie's weird feeling in the billiard room. Verdict: Everyone except Zack thought the place was haunted.
5	5	"Fort MacArthur"	San Pedro, California, US	July 15, 2009	105
The team investigates Fort MacArthur. Paranormal Evidence: A moving shadow, a disembodied walking figure on the thermal camera, a floating orb, only Jackie hearing bangs, footsteps in the tunnel, a muffled explosion, a shadow in the gunpit and a radio losing control in the north tunnel. Verdict: All the investigators considered the place haunted.
6	6	"Marine Warehouse"	San Pedro, California, US	July 22, 2009	106
The team investigates an abandoned marine warehouse used in World War II. Paranormal Evidence: A moving apparition on the wall, the elevator opening by itself, the sounds of animals and a whistle on the sixth floor, only Sam hearing a dog bark, the sound of a cable snapping and a figure walking next to the elevator. Verdict: Everyone except KC and Sam thought it wasn't haunted.
7	7	"Fred C. Nelles Youth Correctional Facility"	Whittier, California, US	July 29, 2009	107
The team investigates a youth correctional facility and detention center. Paranormal Evidence: A loud bang in the gym, someone yelling "OUT", the lightbulb suddenly popping in the garage, Riley's arm feeling tapped in the Taft cellblock, only Sam hearing girls laughing in the chapel, a dead woman floating in the chapel and a strange light in the chapel window. Verdict: Everyone thought the place was haunted.
8	8	"50s Town Movie Set"	Santa Clarita, California, US	August 5, 2009	108
The team investigates an old movie set. Paranormal Evidence: A strange substance on the closet doorknob, the doorknob changing temperature, a shadow moving across the garage, Riley's sudden sharp pain and an orb in the diner. Verdict: Everyone thought the place wasn't haunted.
9	9	"Mission Inn"	Riverside, California, US	August 12, 2009	109
The team investigates an old hotel rumored to be haunted by its former owner. Paranormal Evidence: A falling noise in Aunt Alice's suite, a loud bang in the annex, a hotspot in the annex, a strange noise in catacomb cellar, a snarling noise in the catacomb hall and KC asking a question and someone responding with "Who's there?". Verdict: Everyone thought the place was haunted.
10	10	"Evergreen Cemetery"	Los Angeles, California, US	August 19, 2009	110
The team investigates a cemetery. Paranormal Evidence: An unknown stench that only Sam could smell, a bouncing hotspot on the open grave, sounds of wood falling in the crematory, glowing orbs in their pictures and invisible fire. Verdict: Everyone except Sam thought it wasn't haunted.
11	11	"Tropico Gold Mine"	Rosamond, California, US	August 26, 2009	111
The team investigates an old gold mine. Paranormal Evidence: The sound of miners working, unknown sounds in one of the shacks, a flickering temperature change in one of the shack walls and the sounds of footsteps in the mines. Verdict: Everyone except KC thought it wasn't haunted.

=== Season 2 (2009) ===
No. overall	No. in season	Title	Location(s)	Original release date	Prod. code
12	1	"Glendora House"	Glendora, California, US	October 7, 2009	201
The team investigates a house. Paranormal Evidence: A strong amount of perfume and tobacco in the air, the curtain moving on its own, the bathroom faucet turning on itself twice, a voice saying, "My house..." and another saying, "My name is Sarah.". Verdict: Everyone thought the place was haunted. Note: This episode was meant to be part of Season 1.
13	2	"Linda Vista Hospital"	Los Angeles, California, US	October 9, 2009	202
The team investigates a supposedly haunted hospital. Paranormal Evidence: A cold apparition, a record being pushed off a shelf, loud bangs throughout, something touching Zack on the foot, a foul odor in morgue and a cat in the patients wing door window. Verdict: Everyone except KC thought this place was not haunted. Note: The episode was seen in the trailer. This episode was meant to be part of Season 1.
14	3	"Camp Gilmore"	Calabasas, California, US	October 12, 2009	203
The team investigates a camp. Paranormal Evidence: Weird mist floating throughout, someone saying, "It was us...". a hot spot in an old fire pit, mist that forms a skull and another saying "Sarah". Verdict: Everyone thought Camp Gillmore was haunted.
15	4	"La Purisima Mission"	Lompoc, California, US	October 14, 2009	204
The team investigates La Purisima Mission. Paranormal Evidence: Jackie asking for the door to be opened, a bright in the hallway, a fast speck of dust and Sam talking in Spanish and someone replies "You guys...". Verdict: Everyone except Zack considered La Purisima Mission haunted.
16	5	"Santa Maria Sugar Factory"	Santa Maria, California, US	October 16, 2009	205
The team investigates a sugar factory. Paranormal Evidence: A loud bang in the silow, KC asks a question and someone answering "Yes.", and a bright orb in one of their photos. Verdict: All but Jackie and KC considered the place not haunted.
17	6	"Santa Anita Racetrack"	Arcadia, California, US	October 21, 2009	206
The team investigates a race track. Paranormal Evidence: A hot spot in the bucket, an orb floating above the bushes and a very bright figure running. Verdict:Everyone except Jackie and KC thought this place not haunted.
18	7	"Los Angeles Power Plant"	Los Angeles, California, US	October 23, 2009	207
The team investigates a power plant. Paranormal Evidence: Someone saying, "Which bang?", the K2 meter suddenly increasing by the pipes and a little orb in the intake pipe room. Verdict: All except Riley considered this place haunted.
19	8	"The Preston Castle"	Ione, California, US	October 26, 2009 (online)	208
The team investigates a former reform school that housed troubled boys and young men. Paranormal Evidence: The door opening itself before they enter, an orb running on the thermal camera, someone interrupting Zack with a "No.", an apparition of an escaping person in the kitchen window and a gurney rolling on its own. Verdict: All the investigators considered the place haunted.
20	9	"Santa Barbara Courthouse"	Santa Barbara, California, US	October 27, 2009 (online)	209
The team investigates the Santa Barbara Courthouse. Paranormal Evidence: A shadow in hallway, the elevator opening itself, a floating shadow passing by, only KC and Sam hearing footsteps and a bright flash in hall. Verdict: All the investigators considered the place haunted.
21	10	"Union Hotel"	Los Alamos, California, US	October 28, 2009 (online)	210
The team investigates a western inn where many cowboys, bandits, and gamblers met a tragic deaths. Paranormal Evidence: A walking apparition going down the stairs, a strange flash, a strange light and an unknown face on one of their photos. Verdict: Everyone thought the place was haunted.
22	11	"Camino Saw Mill"	Camino, California, US	October 29, 2009	211
The team investigates a saw mill with an eerie past. Paranormal Evidence: chair hot with no person sitting on it, orb in conveyor belt, another picture of orb, smells, noises, tri-field meter squealing, machinery hot. Verdict: Everyone but KC thought the place was not haunted.
23	12	"Alcatraz"	San Francisco, California, US	October 30, 2009	212
The team investigates the prison of Alcatraz. Paranormal Evidence: A strange hotspot, an orb in the gun gallery, a flashing orb, In the showers, someone saying "It's cold..." and later banjo music similar to Al Capone. Verdict: Everyone thought that it was haunted.
