= Big Baby =

Big Baby may refer to:

- Glen Davis (basketball) (born 1986), American basketball player
- Chris Flexen (born 1994), American baseball player
- Marcus Jones (fighter) (born 1973), American mixed martial artist
- Jarrell Miller (born 1988), American boxer and kickboxer
- Shaun Rogers (American football) (born 1979), American football player
- Big Baby, a 2000 graphic novel by Charles Burns
- Big Baby, a 2015 film
- "Big Baby" (House), an episode of House
- Big Baby, a fictional character in Toy Story 3
- Big Babies, British children's television show
- Big Baby, a series of animated shorts that aired on Cartoon Network
