= Tom Ascheim =

American television producer and executive

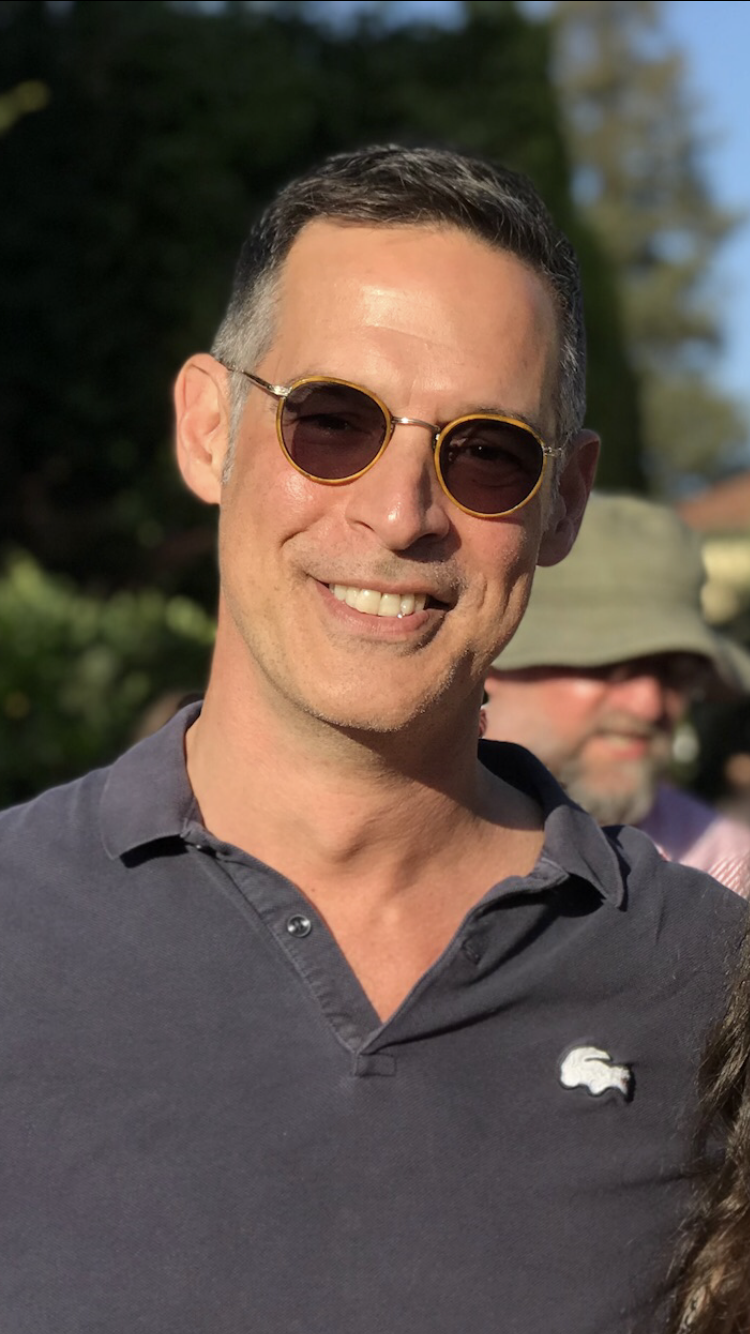
- Education: Yale University (B.A.); Yale School of Management (M.B.A.)
- Occupations: Television producer; Business executive
- Years active: 1998–present

Tom Ascheim is an American television producer and executive. He most recently served president of Warner Bros. Global Kids, Young Adults and Classics from July 1, 2020 until May 11, 2022. From 1998 to 2003, Ascheim was the general manager of Noggin, which started as a tween-targeted channel co-owned by Nickelodeon and Sesame Workshop. Ascheim later held several executive roles for both Nickelodeon and Sesame Workshop. From 2013 to 2020, he was the president of the cable channel ABC Family, which was renamed Freeform in 2016.

== Early life and education ==
In high school, Ascheim worked as an air conditioning repair man, and giving out flyers for a borough presidential candidate in the Bronx. In 1985, Ascheim earned a Bachelor of Arts degree in American Studies from Yale University. In 1990, he received a Master of Business Administration degree from the Yale School of Management. Originally he worked as an assistant to independent film producer Geoffrey Drummond, and a financial analyst at Silver Screen Management.

== Career ==
Ascheim joined Viacom in 1990 as the Vice President of Nickelodeon Business Development and Media Products, and in 1997 was promoted to Vice President of Business Development, Publishing and Media. In July 1998, Ascheim was named the first employee and general manager of Noggin, a cable network created by Nickelodeon and Sesame Workshop that would launch in early 1999. The network was originally aimed at a tween audience. He oversaw the network's content library and its original series. He helped create a variety of the interstitial series that Noggin played, often using talent from Sesame Workshop. He also oversaw multiple rebrands of the channel, including introducing the host characters of Moose and Zee in 2003. In 2006, Ascheim was promoted to the position of Executive Vice President & General Manager of Nickelodeon Digital Television, a newly created role. In this position, he continued to manage Noggin and its teen-oriented nighttime block, The N. He also oversaw Nickelodeon Games and Sports and Nicktoons.

Ascheim left Nickelodeon in 2007 to become the CEO of Newsweek, where he oversaw global operations of the publication and its merger with The Daily Beast. In 2012, it was announced that Ascheim had been named by Sesame Workshop as their chief strategy officer and executive vice president of Sesame Learning. In 2013 he left Sesame Workshop to become the president of ABC Family, at a time when his daughters were big fans of the network. Ascheim was the driving force behind the network's rebranding as Freeform.

He was of Freeform until April 2020, when he stepped down to take the position of president of Warner Bros. Global Kids, Young Adults and Classics, a division which would have oversight over Cartoon Network, Cartoon Network Studios, Warner Bros. Animation, Adult Swim and Turner Classic Movies; beginning July 1, 2020. Upon the formation of Warner Bros. Discovery in April 2022, the division became known as Warner Bros. Discovery Kids, Young Adults and Classics. However, it was announced a month later that he would be departing the company and the position eliminated.

== Personal life ==
Ascheim has a son and two daughters.

== Filmography ==
Year	Title	Credit(s)	Ref.
2001–2002	The URL with Phred Show	Executive producer	

Preceded by Michael Ouweleen (interim)	The Cartoon Network, Inc. president July 1, 2020–May 11, 2022	Succeeded by Michael Ouweleen
