= Jim Samples =

American businessman and media executive

- Born: James Donald Samples Jr. 1963 (age 62–63); Atlanta, Georgia, US
- Occupations: Businessman, media executive
- Years active: 1989–present
- Spouse: Margaret
- Children: 2

James Donald Samples Jr. (born 1963) is an American businessman and media executive. He is best known as the Senior Vice President and General Manager of TNT Latin America and Cartoon Network Latin America from 2000 to 2001, the second president, CEO and COO of The Cartoon Network, Inc. (TCN) from 2001 to 2007, the President of HGTV from 2007 to 2011, the President of Scripps Networks International since 2011, and the President of the Management Board at TVN Group from 2016 to 2018. In 2019 joined Gremi Media SA.

== Early life ==
Samples was born and raised in Atlanta, Georgia. After graduating with a Bachelor's degree from Presbyterian College, he received a Master's degree in International Business Studies from the University of South Carolina.

== Career ==
=== NationsBank ===
From 1989 to 1993, Samples was a relationship manager, international examination department vice president, and manager at NationsBank.

=== Turner Broadcasting System ===
Samples spent nearly fourteen years with Turner Broadcasting System in various leadership capacities spanning affiliate sales, marketing, programming and digital media. He started his career at Turner in international business development in 1993 and then became the President of Turner International Argentina, based in Buenos Aires, the following year. In 2000, Samples became Senior Vice President and General Manager of TNT Latin America and Cartoon Network Latin America, serving as such until 2001. but continued to take care of the Latin American Channel through executives Barry Koch and Cindy Kerr until his resign in 2007 and its credited with launching Toonami in 2002 and Adult Swim in 2005. He also served as the General Manager of CartoonNetwork.com around this time.

On August 22, 2001, Samples was promoted as president, chief executive officer (CEO), and chief operating officer (COO) of The Cartoon Network, Inc. (TCN), replacing the media company's founder Betty Cohen. Under Samples's leadership, the network included successful original series such as Samurai Jack, Codename: Kids Next Door, The Grim Adventures of Billy & Mandy, Star Wars: Clone Wars, Foster's Home for Imaginary Friends, Hi Hi Puffy AmiYumi, The Life and Times of Juniper Lee, Camp Lazlo, Ben 10, and Class of 3000.

Under Samples's leadership, Cartoon Network also somewhat controversially began airing live-action "cartoon-inspired" movies in 2005, such as The Goonies and Who Framed Roger Rabbit; this move was made in response to CN's slumping ratings due to competing live-action shows on Nickelodeon and Disney Channel. In 2006, the network produced their first live-action original movie, Re-Animated, a combination of live-action and animation. When asked about the project, Samples stated "We think when it's done the 'Cartoon Network' way, kids will enjoy seeing animation and the real world collide." While Cartoon Network intended to produce future shows that blend live action with animation as well as "cartoony" live-action shows, Samples maintained "we're predominately an animated network and that's not changing anytime soon."

Samples resigned from the company on February 9, 2007, following a bomb scare in Boston caused by packages left around the city that were part of an outdoor marketing campaign promoting the Adult Swim series Aqua Teen Hunger Force. Samples made the decision "in recognition of the gravity of the situation that occurred under my watch", and with the "hope that my decision allows us to put this chapter behind us and get back to our mission of delivering unrivaled original animated entertainment for consumers of all ages". Following Samples's resignation, Stuart Snyder was named his successor.

=== HGTV ===
After his resignation, Samples transferred to Scripps Networks Interactive. He was appointed President of HGTV (later became part of Warner Bros. Discovery together with TVN Group on April 8, 2022 that also owns the previous Turner properties he worked on including The Cartoon Network, Inc.) in 2007 and served as such until 2011. During his tenure, HGTV ranked every year as the #1 network among upscale female viewers in the U.S. At HGTV, Samples broadened the network's programming slate by introducing a series of hits shows including Love It or List It, Property Brothers and Kitchen Cousins while greatly expanding the network's hit franchise House Hunters. He also partnered with the consumer products team to create new off-air brand extensions including HGTV Magazine, the #1 home magazine in the U.S., and an extensive HGTV-branded product line.

=== Scripps Networks International ===
Since 2011, Samples has served as President of Scripps Networks International. In this role, he oversees the strategic direction and daily operations of the company's international division which distributes five international brands – Asian Food Channel, Fine Living, Food Network, HGTV, and Travel Channel – across Europe, the Middle East, Africa, the Asia-Pacific, and Latin America. In addition, Samples sits on the Board for and manages the company's joint-venture relationships with both UKTV in the UK and Shaw Media in Canada. He also oversees the division's international program licensing business.

=== TVN ===
In mid-2015, Scripps bought TVN Group, one of the leading media companies in Poland. In July 2016, in addition to overseeing SNI's international division, Samples was appointed TVN's new President of the Management Board, and was confirmed the company's CEO in 2017. Under Samples's leadership, the Polish media group has significantly expanded its distribution footprint. HGTV has made its first move into Europe with a successful launch in Poland in January 2017. Food Network and Travel Channel have also enriched TVN's bouquet of channels and the company has further strengthened its digital position by acquiring Gamellon, a multichannel network partnering with YouTube in CEE. In 2018, Samples was replaced as President of the Management Board by Piotr Korycki, with Samples moving to the companies' supervisory board.

=== Other ventures ===
Samples also sits on the boards of the Arrowmont School of Arts and Crafts and Presbyterian College.

== Personal life ==
Samples currently lives in Knoxville, Tennessee with his wife and two daughters.

Preceded by Betty Cohen	The Cartoon Network, Inc. president, CEO, and COO; August 22, 2001–February 9, 2007	Succeeded by Stuart Snyder
