= Betty Cohen =

American businesswoman and television executive

- Born: Betty Susan Cohen; July 27, 1956 (age 70); Racine, Wisconsin, U.S.
- Education: Stanford University
- Occupations: Businesswoman, media executive
- Years active: 1975–present
- Known for: Co-founder, and first President, Chief Executive Officer and Chief Operating Officer of The Cartoon Network, Inc. (1992–2001)

Betty Susan Cohen (born July 27, 1956) is an American businesswoman and media executive. She is best known as the co-founder, and original president, CEO and COO of The Cartoon Network, Inc. from 1992 to 2001, the CEO of Lifetime Entertainment Services from 2005 to 2007, the founder and president of Betty Cohen Media Consulting since 2008, and the founder and CEO of Hearts & Minds Media since 2019.

== Early life ==
Cohen grew up in Racine, Wisconsin. She was involved in theater in high school and wrote her senior paper on the Children's Television Workshop (now Sesame Workshop). She attended Stanford University from 1973 to 1977, where she majored in communications.

== Career ==
=== Public Media Center ===
In 1977, Cohen began her career as a production manager for Public Media Center, an ad agency. She had been tasked with producing public service announcements, and soon came to realize that the "larger picture" was her strength rather than smaller details. Cohen said, "I was the person who had the perspective to see where the project should head, rather than writing the first draft."

=== Cable Health Network ===
In 1982, Cohen joined the Cable Health Network as their first manager of marketing.

=== Nickelodeon ===
From 1984 to 1988, Cohen was director of on-air promotion and interstitial programming for Nickelodeon. Her marketing at this time yielded the Nick at Nite block, dubbed "the Network for the TV Generation."

=== Turner Broadcasting System ===
In 1988, Cohen joined Turner Broadcasting System, where she was appointed as TNT's general manager and director of marketing. She was promoted to senior vice president of TNT and tasked her with creating a channel to house Ted Turner's recently-purchased, extensive animation library. Cohen thus co-founded The Cartoon Network, Inc. with Ted Turner on March 12, 1992 and was its president, chief executive officer (CEO), and chief operating officer (COO) until June 18, 2001. Under her leadership, network brands such as Toonami, Boomerang, the Cartoon Cartoons, Cartoon Cartoon Fridays, and Cartoon Orbit were introduced, as well as original series such as Space Ghost Coast to Coast, What a Cartoon!, Dexter's Laboratory, Johnny Bravo, Cow and Chicken, The Powerpuff Girls, Ed, Edd n Eddy, and Courage the Cowardly Dog. Dexter's Laboratory, in particular, was one of her favorite animated shows. The network became a global phenomenon during her tenure, with asset value of nearly $3 billion.

Cohen stepped down from her post on June 18, 2001, due to creative disagreements with Jamie Kellner, then-head of Turner Broadcasting; she also stated, "I was afraid I would die the queen of cartoons." She was succeeded at CN by Jim Samples. Cohen remained with parent company AOL-Time Warner until September 2002, to develop multiplatform services aimed at adolescents and young adults.

=== Lifetime ===
From 2005 to 2007, Cohen returned to Lifetime Entertainment Services and served as their CEO and president. Cohen helped the network attract a younger audience.

=== Betty Cohen Media Consulting ===
Cohen is the founder and president of Betty Cohen Media Consulting since 2008, which offers companies advice on brand-building, cable-channel development, and multiplatform programming.

=== Hearts & Minds ===
Cohen is the founder and CEO of Hearts & Minds Media since 2019, a media company that focuses on leveraging social and emotional learning for girls.

== Accolades ==
Cohen was ranked as one of Fortune's 50 Most Powerful Women in Business in 2000. She was inducted into the Broadcasting and Cable Hall of Fame and received the Muse Award from NY Women in Film and TV.

== Personal life ==
Cohen currently resides in New York City.

Preceded by First	The Cartoon Network, Inc. president, CEO, and COO; March 12, 1992–June 18, 2001	Succeeded by Jim Samples
