= Cartoon Network =

American cable television network

- Logo used since May 29, 2010
- Country: United States
- Broadcast area: Nationwide
- Headquarters: Ted Turner Campus, 1050 Techwood Drive NW; Atlanta, Georgia, U.S.

Programming
- Languages: English; Spanish (Note: via SAP, a Spanish language simulcast of the channel is also available.)
- Picture format: 1080i (HDTV) (downscaled to letterboxed 480i for the SDTV feed)

Ownership
- Owner: Skydance
- Parent: The Cartoon Network, Inc.
- Key people: Michael Ouweleen (president)
- Sister channels: List: Adult Swim; Boomerang; Cartoonito; Discovery Familia; Discovery Family

History
- Launched: October 1, 1992; 34 years ago
- Founder: Betty Cohen

Links
- Website: Cartoon Network (dead link, redirects to HBO Max or a local Cartoon Network site depending on the country)

Availability (channel space shared with nighttime programming block Adult Swim)

Streaming media
- Affiliated Streaming Services: HBO Max (Note: Beginning in 2022, after the formation of Warner Bros. Discovery, most Cartoon Network content was removed from HBO Max.); Hulu (Note: Hulu has been the de facto streaming service who hosts the majority of Cartoon Network content since 2022, after most Cartoon Network content was removed from HBO Max.); Tubi (Note: The de facto streaming service hosting legacy Cartoon Network programs from the 1990s to the 2000s.)
- Internet Protocol television: YouTube TV, Hulu + Live TV, Sling TV, DirecTV Stream, Spectrum

Cartoon Network (CN) is an American cable television network and the flagship property of The Cartoon Network, Inc., a corporate umbrella within the television division of Skydance. Launched on October 1, 1992, it primarily broadcasts animated television series, mostly children's programming, ranging from action to animated comedy.

It currently runs from 6 a.m. to 5 p.m. ET/PT daily and primarily targets children aged 6 to 12, though some early morning programming, formerly of the Cartoonito block, is aimed at preschool-aged children, while evening block Adult Swim targets young adults.

It was brought under common ownership with long-time rival Nickelodeon following the 2026 acquisition of Warner Bros. Discovery by the parent company of Nickelodeon, Paramount Skydance (now known as Skydance).

As of November 2023, Cartoon Network is available to approximately 66 million pay television households in the United States — down from its peak of 100 million households in 2011.

== History ==
Cartoon Network logo used from October 1, 1992, to June 14, 2004

On August 9, 1986, Turner Broadcasting System acquired Metro-Goldwyn-Mayer/United Artists (MGM/UA). On October 18, Turner forcibly sold back MGM. However, Turner kept much of the film and television library made before May 1986 (including some of the UA library) and formed Turner Entertainment Co. On October 8, 1988, its cable channel Turner Network Television (TNT) was launched and gained an audience with its extensive film library. In 1991, Turner also purchased the library of animation studio Hanna-Barbera. Ted Turner selected Betty Cohen (then-Senior Vice President of TNT) to devise a network to house these programs. On February 18, 1992, Turner Broadcasting announced its plans to launch Cartoon Network as an outlet for an animation library. On March 12, 1992, its namesake corporate parent company was founded one month after Turner's plan was announced. On October 1, 1992, the network officially launched as the first 24-hour single-genre cable channel with animation as its main theme. Betty Cohen was appointed as its first president.

Logo used from June 14, 2004, to May 29, 2010

In 1994, Hanna-Barbera's new division Cartoon Network Studios was founded and started production on What a Cartoon!. This show debuted in 1995, offering original animated shorts. In 1996, Cartoon Network aired two preschool programs: Big Bag, a live-action/puppet television program with animated short series produced by Children's Television Workshop, and Small World, which featured animated series aimed at preschoolers imported from foreign countries. Turner Broadcasting System merged with Time Warner, which consolidated/reverted ownership of all the Warner Bros. cartoons. The network could then continue more original productions.

== Programming ==
Cartoon Network's current original programming includes such shows as The Amazing World of Gumball and We Baby Bears. The network's original programming is produced at Cartoon Network Studios, while other shows have either been co-produced with or acquired from other studios, including the affiliated Warner Bros. Animation. In the past, Cartoon Network has also produced and aired live-action and animated hybrid programming.

Over the years, Cartoon Network has aired various Looney Tunes, Merrie Melodies, Tom and Jerry, and Droopy shorts in constant rotation, dating back to the network's launch in 1992 until 2017. In its early days, Cartoon Network benefited from having access to a large collection of animated programming, including the libraries of Warner Bros. (Looney Tunes and Merrie Melodies), Metro-Goldwyn-Mayer (Tom and Jerry), Hanna-Barbera (The Flintstones, Scooby-Doo, Snorks), and DC Comics (Superman, Batman, Wonder Woman, Justice League and Teen Titans). Turner's acquisition of Hanna-Barbera provided the network with a proprietary animation studio and a library of established intellectual property, creating a competitive advantage over its rivals. Most of these series were removed by 1999 and moved to Boomerang in 2000.

=== Original series ===
Much of Cartoon Network's original programming originates from the network's in-house studio, Cartoon Network Studios. Beginning as a division of Hanna-Barbera, this studio would produce some of the network's earliest original series, including Dexter's Laboratory, Cow and Chicken, I Am Weasel, Johnny Bravo, and The Powerpuff Girls. Cartoon Cartoons was once the branding for Cartoon Network's original animated television series, but it was retired by the network in 2004 after the CN City rebrand on June 14. The name was eventually discontinued in 2008. Additionally, several of the Cartoon Network's original series have been produced by studios other than the network's own in-house studio. Notable examples are Ed, Edd n Eddy, Courage the Cowardly Dog, and Codename: Kids Next Door. The name was resurrected by the network in 2021 for a new animated shorts program.

=== Programming blocks ===
From 1999 to 2003, Cartoon Cartoon Fridays served as the channel's flagship block, featuring premieres of Cartoon Network original series that fell under the Cartoon Cartoons branding. From 2003 to 2007, the block was revamped as the live-action "Fridays". The Toonami block, which originally ran from 1997 to 2008, primarily carried action-oriented series aimed towards an older youth and teen audience, including imported anime series; it was later re-launched under the auspices of Adult Swim in 2012. 2009 saw the introduction of CN Real, a block that featured live-action reality television series aimed towards a youth audience. In 2011, the channel introduced DC Nation, a block that would be focused on series adapted from DC Comics properties.

In September 2021, Cartoon Network introduced two new blocks oriented towards preschool and family viewing respectively, including the preschool block Cartoonito, and the new Sunday-evening block ACME Night–which primarily carries family films and library content, as well as other original series, specials, and television films from Warner Bros. Animation, as well as some programming from Adult Swim. They were introduced as part of an effort by new head Tom Ascheim to broaden Cartoon Network's demographic reach. ACME Night moved to Adult Swim on September 3, 2023, due to Adult Swim moving its daily sign-on time to 5 p.m. ET/PT.

=== Editing of theatrical cartoon shorts ===
Cartoon Network has, during its history, broadcast most of the Warner Bros. animated shorts originally created between the 1920s and the 1960s, but the network edited out scenes depicting discharge of gunfire, alcohol ingestion, cowboys and Native Americans gags, tobacco, and politically incorrect humor. The unedited versions were kept from both broadcasting and wide release on the video market. Coal Black and de Sebben Dwarfs (1943), a politically incorrect but critically well-regarded short, was notably omitted entirely, while The Scarlet Pumpernickel (1950) and Feed the Kitty (1952), both well-regarded, had their finales heavily edited due to violence.

There was media attention in June 2001 over a network decision concerning further omissions from broadcast. Cartoon Network formerly scheduled a 49-hour-long marathon annually known as June Bugs, promising to broadcast every Bugs Bunny animated short in chronological order.

The network originally intended to include 12 shorts for its 2001 airing of the marathon (one of them part of the Censored Eleven list of Merrie Melodies and Looney Tunes cartoons effectively shelved from distribution) that had become controversial for using ethnic and national stereotypes, albeit broadcasting them past midnight to ensure few children were watching, with introductions concerning their historic value as representatives of another time. Ultimately, these shorts would not make it to air.

== Related brands and units ==
=== Cartoonito ===
Cartoonito is a Warner Bros.–owned preschool brand that first launched in 2006 for the United Kingdom before expanding to other international markets. In February 2021, it was announced that Cartoonito would make its U.S. debut as a programming block on Cartoon Network and content brand on HBO Max; the block launched on September 13, 2021 and closed on May 23, 2025.

=== Adult Swim ===
Adult Swim (often stylized as [adult swim] or [as]) is the adult-oriented programming brand of Cartoon Network. Programs featured on Adult Swim are geared toward a mature audience, in contrast to the all-ages, preteen daytime programming of Cartoon Network. As a result, Adult Swim is treated by Nielsen as a separate channel in its ratings reports (similar to Nickelodeon's Nick at Nite block) and marketed as such because of its differing target demographics. The block broadcasts both animated and live-action shows (including original programming, reruns of animated sitcoms, and other action and anime series) generally with minimal or no editing for content.

As of September 2023, Adult Swim broadcasts daily from 5:00 p.m. to 6:00 a.m. ET/PT. Initially airing in the late-night hours, it has since expanded into prime time, moving its start time to 10 p.m. in 2009, 9 p.m. in 2010, and 8 p.m. in March 2014. The 8 p.m. hour has frequently been returned to Cartoon Network for special programming events and premieres, typically during the fall-to-early-winter period.

Due to Cartoon Network's viewership shifting almost exclusively towards teenagers and young adults in the evening hours, Adult Swim's sign-on was moved to 7 p.m. ET/PT on weekdays and Saturdays on May 1, 2023. This expansion led to an increase in the 18-34 demographic, making Cartoon Network 6th place in ad-supported networks during prime time during the month after. Due to the immediate ratings boost, the network announced a second expansion on June 7 with the block sign-on initially scheduled for 6 p.m. ET/PT on August 28 (later expanded further to 5 p.m. as confirmed on August 8).

The 5 and 6 p.m. weekday hours feature vault programming from both Cartoon Network and Adult Swim: Checkered Past is showcased Monday through Thursday, consisting of Cartoon Network original series from the 1990s and 2000s, while Fridays showcase classic Toonami programming as part of "Toonami Rewind". Additionally, movies were aired every Sunday under the ACME Night banner, which was first introduced in September 2021 during Cartoon Network's pivot toward family audiences.

==== Toonami ====
Toonami (a portmanteau of "cartoon" and "tsunami", suggesting a "tidal wave" of animated cartoons) is a brand used for action-oriented programming blocks and television channels worldwide. The original program block launched on Cartoon Network in the United States on March 17, 1997, and primarily aired both American cartoons and Japanese anime. The block ended its original run on September 20, 2008, before being revived on May 26, 2012, as a relaunch of Adult Swim's Saturday night anime block. Toonami's current incarnation is similar to that of "Midnight Run", a special version of the block that originally ran on Saturday nights and was the forerunner for Adult Swim. The block is best known for its branding and aesthetic, including its animated host, a robot named TOM, that was later voiced by Steve Blum.

The Toonami brand was also used internationally for dedicated networks in the United Kingdom (replacing CNX), Asia (in December 2012), India (in February 2015), and France (in February 2016).

=== Boomerang ===
Boomerang is a brand dedicated to classic and theatrical cartoons aimed towards children and families. It was originally a weekend programming block that aired on Cartoon Network from December 8, 1992, until October 3, 2004. On April 1, 2000, Boomerang received a new look and was spun off into its own cable channel. In 2017, an online Boomerang video-on-demand service was launched, which includes classic series along with new episodes of original series like Scooby-Doo and Guess Who?, New Looney Tunes, and The Tom and Jerry Show.

=== Other services ===
Description	Service
Cartoon Network HD	Cartoon Network HD is the high-definition simulcast of Cartoon Network that is available on nearly all providers, which launched on October 15, 2007. The high definition feed broadcasts in 1080i high-definition. Like all Warner Bros. Discovery networks, 4:3 sourced content was stretched on the high definition feed to fill the 16:9 aspect ratio, but it changed to cropping unrestored 4:3 sourced content to 14:9 from September 25 to October 17, 2023, before pillarboxing all 4:3 sourced content from October 18 onward. Starting September 26, 2009, all original shows were unstretched on the high definition feed in which were presented in their original 16:9 widescreen aspect ratio of 1.78:1. The network's HD content airs with letterboxing on the standard definition channel, and since May 2013, many subscription providers carry the high definition feed and downscale it for the standard definition feed, broadcasting in 16:9 letterboxed to fit the 4:3 ratio.
Spanish-language feed	Cartoon Network offers an alternate Spanish-language audio feed, either via a separate channel with the English audio track removed as part of a package of Spanish-language television networks sold by subscription providers, or a separate audio track accessible through the SAP option, depending on the provider.
Cartoon Network on Demand	Cartoon Network on Demand is a video on demand service on cable and satellite providers which launched in 2002.
Move It Movement	Move It Movement (formerly Get Animated until 2010) was an initiative that encouraged children to get active, and more importantly, in outdoor areas. The program was designed "to provide support and encouragement in the ongoing battle against childhood obesity." The Get Animated campaign was launched on February 28, 2005. As of 2014, Move It Movement is currently inactive and has since been replaced by the Stop Bullying Speak Up initiative.
HBO Max	HBO Max, formerly Max from 2023 to 2025, is Warner Bros. Discovery's official subscription video-on-demand service. Cartoon Network content initially constituted a significant amount of the service's catalog, though much of it has been pulled starting in August 2022.

=== Production studios ===
==== Cartoon Network Studios ====
Cartoon Network Studios originated as a division of Hanna-Barbera in 1994 to produce original programs for the network; it eventually became its own entity in 1999. While the studio has produced many Cartoon Network series, shows such as Big Bag, Ed, Edd n Eddy, Mike, Lu & Og, Courage the Cowardly Dog, Sheep in the Big City, Codename: Kids Next Door, The Secret Saturdays, and Sunday Pants were all produced without its involvement. Cartoon Network Studios has also produced shows for Adult Swim (alongside sister company Williams Street), HBO Max, and Cartoonito. Live-action programming, initially for Cartoon Network but now exclusively for Adult Swim, is produced under the pseudonyms Alive and Kicking, Inc.; Rent Now Productions; and Factual Productions.

==== Williams Street ====
Williams Street Productions (formerly Ghost Planet Industries) serves as the headquarters and production arm for Adult Swim, located at 1065 Williams Street NW in Atlanta, Georgia. It produces original animated and live-action programs, and is also responsible for programming Toonami as well as former Cartoon Network blocks such as Cartoon Planet, Miguzi, and the Saturday Video Entertainment System. Prior to Adult Swim, the company produced Space Ghost Coast to Coast.

==== Hanna-Barbera Studios Europe ====
Hanna-Barbera Studios Europe (formerly Cartoon Network Development Studio Europe until 2012 and Cartoon Network Studios Europe until 2021) is the network's European production arm located in London, England.

==== Cartoon Network Latin America Original Productions ====
Cartoon Network Latin America Original Productions (abbreviated as CN LA), formerly known as Cartoon Network Producciones, is the production arm of the network's Latin American station, founded in 2004.

== Media ==
=== Cartoon Network Games ===
Cartoon Network Games
- Formerly: Cartoon Network Interactive (2000–2014)
- Type: Subsidiary
- Industry: Video games
- Founded: 2000; 26 years ago

Cartoon Network Games (formerly Cartoon Network Interactive) is the video game developer and publisher of video games based on Cartoon Network shows since 2000.

==== Video games ====
In 2011, Cartoon Network characters were featured in a four-player mascot brawler fighting game similar to Nintendo's Super Smash Bros. video game series called Cartoon Network: Punch Time Explosion for the Nintendo 3DS. The game was later released for the Xbox 360, PlayStation 3 and the Wii as Cartoon Network Punch Time Explosion XL. Several video games based on the cartoon series Ben 10 were released by Cartoon Network as well. The Cartoon Network website also featured various browser games incorporating characters from various Cartoon Network franchises. One such game was FusionFall, a massive multiplayer game released on January 14, 2009, and shut down on August 29, 2013.

=== Cartoon Network Enterprises ===
Cartoon Network Enterprises is the network's global licensing and merchandising arm established in 2005, taking over from Warner Bros. Entertainment. It distributes merchandises of various Cartoon Network brands.

=== Mobile app ===
Cartoon Network has a mobile app that provides the latest full episodes, a live stream from the East and West coast, games, and the network's schedule.

=== Book licensing ===
Cartoon Network Books is the book licensor established in 2015. It licenses books based on various Cartoon Network franchises.

=== Movies ===
Cartoon Network has produced various films, most of them being television films; the only films from Cartoon Network that had a theatrical release are The Powerpuff Girls Movie (Cartoon Network Studios), Aqua Teen Hunger Force Colon Movie Film for Theaters (Williams Street), Regular Show: The Movie (Cartoon Network Studios) and Teen Titans Go! To The Movies (Warner Bros. Animation and DC Entertainment).

=== Online ===
Cartoon Network registered its official website, CartoonNetwork.com, on January 9, 1996. It officially launched on July 27, 1998. Sam Register served as Cartoon Network Online's senior vice president and creative director from 1997 to 2001, and Rob Sorcher served as executive vice president and head of Cartoon Network Online. In its early years, small studios partnered with the network to produce exclusive "Web Premiere Toons", short cartoons made specifically for CartoonNetwork.com. More about animation was included in the "Department of Cartoons", which featured storyboards, episode guides, backgrounds, sound and video files, model sheets, production notes, and other information about shows on the network. In January 1999, the Department of Cartoons showcased the "MGM Golden Age Collection", most of which had not been published or even seen in more than 50 years. Cartoon Network launched Cartoon Orbit, an online gaming network characterized by digital trading cards called "cToons", in October 2000. The game officially ended on October 16, 2006.

In October 2000, CartoonNetwork.com outdid its rival Nickelodeon's website in terms of unique users, scoring 2.12 million compared to Nick.com's 1.95 million. In July 2007, Nielsen ratings data showed visitors spent an average of 77 minutes on the site, surpassing the previous record of 71 minutes set in 2004, and the site ranked 26th in terms of time spent for all US domains.

On August 8, 2024, CartoonNetwork.com was closed down and was redirected to the Cartoon Network channel hub of the streaming service Max. Regarding the closure of the network's website, a Cartoon Network spokesperson stated "we are focusing on the Cartoon Network shows and social media where we find consumers are the most engaged and there is a meaningful potential for growth". Gizmodo reported that this shutdown not only removes "an archive of clips" and "free access to series" but also the website "hosted years of beloved flash games relating to its shows. While many have been erased over the years through various site redesigns–and archived elsewhere for nostalgic fans–at least some of the current archives are still accessible via international versions of the Cartoon Network website in regions where Max is currently unavailable".

== Marketing ==
Cartoon Network shows with established fan followings, such as Dexter's Laboratory, allowed the network to pursue licensing agreements with companies interested in selling series-related merchandise. For example, agreements with Kraft Foods led to widespread in-store advertising for Cartoon Network-related products. The network also worked on cross-promotion campaigns with both Kraft and Tower Records. In product development and marketing, the network has benefited from its relation to corporate parent Time Warner (later WarnerMedia, now Warner Bros. Discovery), allowing for mutually beneficial relationships with various subsidiary companies.

Time Warner Cable, the former cable television subsidiary of the corporate parent (which was spun off from Time Warner in 2009), distributes Cartoon Network as part of its packages. Turner Broadcasting System, the subsidiary overseeing various Warner Bros. Discovery-owned networks, helped cross-promote Cartoon Network shows and at times arranged for swapping certain shows between the networks. For example, Foster's Home for Imaginary Friends, one of CN's original shows, was at times seen at Kids' WB (which was discontinued on May 24, 2008), while Xiaolin Showdown and ¡Mucha Lucha!, two of Kids' WB's original shows, were seen at Cartoon Network. In each case, the swap intended to cultivate a shared audience for the two networks. Time Inc., the former subsidiary overseeing the magazines of the corporate parent, ensured favorable coverage of Cartoon Network and advertising space across its publications. Printed advertisements for CN shows could appear in magazines such as Time, Entertainment Weekly and Sports Illustrated Kids until Time Inc. was spun off from Time Warner on June 9, 2014. AOL, a now-former sibling company to Time Warner covering Internet services, helped promote Cartoon Network shows online by offering exclusive content for certain animated series, online sweepstakes and display advertising for CN.

Warner Bros. Home Entertainment, the home video subsidiary, distributes VHS tapes, DVDs and Blu-ray discs featuring Cartoon Network shows. Select Warner Bros. Family Entertainment VHS releases came with bonus cartoons from Cartoon Network. Rhino Entertainment, the former record label subsidiary of the corporate parent (which was spun off from Time Warner in 2004), distributed cassette tapes and CDs with Cartoon Network-related music. These products were also available through the Warner Bros. Studio Store. DC Comics, the comic book subsidiary, published a series featuring the Powerpuff Girls, indicating it could handle other CN-related characters. Warner Bros., the film studio subsidiary, released The Powerpuff Girls Movie in 2002. Kevin Sandler considered it likely that this film would find its way to HBO or Cinemax, two television network subsidiaries which regularly broadcast feature films. Sandler also viewed book tie-ins through Warner Books as likely, since it was the only area of marketing not covered yet by 2001.

Cartoon Network also licensed its original series out for food promotions. Nestlé was granted a licensing agreement that resulted in a Wonder Ball chocolate candy tie-in with Cartoon Network characters and logos beginning in 2003. A new Wonder Ball promotion began in 2004 with characters from Ed, Edd n Eddy and exclusive Wonderball prizes and cToons on the Cartoon Orbit website.

== International ==
Since its inception, Cartoon Network and its sister channels have set up various national and regional feeds. Since the early 1990s and 2000s, the network has expanded to countries including Canada, Mexico, Latin America, the United Kingdom, Ireland, Africa, and several Asia-Pacific regions.

== See also ==
- Adult Swim
- Boomerang
- Cartoon Network and LGBTQ representation
- Cartoonito
- Discovery Family
- MeTV Toons

== Bibliography ==
- Stabile, Carol A.; Harrison, Mark (2003). Prime Time Animation: Television Animation and American Culture. Routledge. ISBN 978-0-415-28326-7. Archived from the original on January 24, 2022 – via Google Books.
