= Cartoon Orbit =

Children's online gaming network

- Cartoon Orbit's front page from 2000-2002
- Website type: Children's digital collectible card game
- Available in: English
- Headquarters: Atlanta, Georgia, United States
- Owner: Turner Broadcasting System (Time Warner)
- Creator: Sam Register
- Commercial: Yes
- Launched: November 2000
- Current status: Closed, October 2006

Cartoon Orbit was an online gaming network created by Turner Online for CartoonNetwork.com that launched in November 2000 to promote its shows and partners. Its main attraction was a system of virtual trading cards called "cToons", which generally featured animation cells from programs broadcast on the network, though advertisement-based cToons were common. Added in October 2002 was the popular head-to-head strategy game gToons.

The site began to suffer from lack of maintenance beginning in 2005. On October 16, 2006, Cartoon Network shut down Cartoon Orbit and left users with a "Thank You" certificate as a token of their appreciation.

== History ==
=== Development ===
Cartoon Orbit was the brainchild of Sam Register, who was behind the development of CartoonNetwork.com in 1998. He went on to become the creative director of the site as well as Cartoon Orbit from 2000 to 2001 before leaving to pursue television development with Cartoon Network in its Los Angeles studios. He came up with the idea for Cartoon Orbit after seeing Sesame Workshop's Sticker World website. After Register left Cartoon Orbit, Art Roche became the creative director of CartoonNetwork.com. Justin Williams was the project lead at Turner and Director of Community for Cartoon Orbit until 2003 when he began working on other Cartoon Network interactive projects. Lisa Furlong Jones, Sharon Karleskint Sharp, and Robert Cass created content and wrote copy for Cartoon Orbit while Noel Saabye and Brian Hilling provided the art and animation.

The site was first registered in May 2000. Beta testing continued into at least November of that year, and a "toononomist" was hired to decide the prices of some 250 character cToons according to senior producer Justin Williams. The original name was to be "Cartooniverse", but it was changed because that name was already copyrighted. Cartoon Orbit was first built using parts of Communities.com's "Passport" software (not to be confused with the current Communities.com, which is unrelated). This software was a 2D avatar-based chat server where members could decorate their own spaces, and its assets were used in Orbit for displaying and editing cZones. Similar to JSON libraries, the Communities.com software "used a browser aspect plug-in with a proprietary messaging layout to govern dynamic HTML elements."

Chat functionality in the finished product was limited to drop-down menus to safeguard children's privacy. To comply with the Children's Online Privacy Protection Act, Cartoon Orbit instead had a list of pre-written words and phrases that players could send in a chat box. Because children's safety online was one of Register's top priorities in developing Cartoon Orbit, parents would receive emails informing them of their children's registration if the child was under the age of 13. According to Jim Samples, content from advertisers was clearly labeled as such so that Cartoon Orbit could predominantly be entertaining "without ruining the experience with too much commercialization."

Until the complete conversion to Adobe Flash in 2002, references could still be found in the HTML source code to passport "room servers" and links to technical documentation on Communities.com's website. Before the Flash transition were "Worlds" on Cartoon Orbit based on fictional cartoon locations, which came complete with a quote or quip from that world's characters, a poll, and links to "Spotlight" cZones, which Orbit players could vote on.

Viant worked on the site as well, offering project and business management for the development and beta and back-end software development for the user and content management. Scott Gutterman served as the lead at Viant, and Stacie Spychalski, David Gynn, Chris Griswold, Chip Plesnarski, Wan Agus, and others managed plans, requirements and developed the code. Before being acquired and ultimately closing, Viant went on to work at several Turner Broadcasting/Time Warner projects from 2000 to 2002.

=== Launch and growth ===
Cartoon Orbit launched in November 2000 as an online community with required registration, though an earlier press release noted a planned October 2000 debut. The launch came by way of a partnership between Time Warner and AOL. Its membership grew over 150,000 members strong by mid-December, and that figure increased to over 300,000 by February 2001. Members exceeded 850,000 by October 2001. Following a site redesign in June 2002, the site's registration exceeded 1 million active users by August. Shortly after its release, Register expressed a desire to convert Orbit's point-based currency to a cash-based setup, but this never came to fruition.

During Cartoon Orbit's lifetime, the site featured promotions and tie-ins that were carried out through its sponsors. As part of a larger campaign with Cartoon Network, a promotion for the fund-raising program Trick-or-Treat for UNICEF, which entailed exclusive Halloween-themed cToons, was held from October 1 to November 5, 2002. In 2001, Kellogg's Powerpuff Girls Cereal had a promotional website, EetAndErn.com, where children could earn points to redeem for prizes including cToons. As part of a licensing agreement, Nestlé featured characters from Cartoon Network's Ed, Edd n Eddy in a 2004 Wonder Ball promotion that offered exclusive Cartoon Network-themed Wonder Balls as a top prize. Among other rewards was access to a special cToon showroom that contained a mystery Wonder Ball cToon. ConAgra Foods partnered with Cartoon Network for its "Big Wig Gig!" sweepstakes promotion, which featured codes for Cartoon Orbit cToons, in 2005.

=== Closure ===
"We regret to announce that Cartoon Orbit will be closing October 16, 2006.

Since the launch of Cartoon Orbit in 2000, we have been amazed and honored by the dedication of our fans. From the days of Orbit Worlds and cZone Spotlight to the introduction of gToons, it's been a memorable ride creating and developing this site for you throughout the years.

As a small token of our appreciation for your incredible loyalty, we would like to offer you a Thank You certificate featuring some of our favorite gToons. We'll automatically insert your username and first login date--just click below to print.

Thank you again to everyone for your support over these six years. For more information about how we've reached this decision, please click below to read our FAQ."

— A notice that Cartoon Orbit would close on October 16, 2006.

For the first few years, the site was updated weekly. Beginning in mid-2005, it became apparent that Turner Online stopped maintaining Cartoon Orbit. Updates were ceased in February 2006 and many reported bugs went unfixed. On August 17, 2006, Cartoon Network removed the navigation for Cartoon Orbit from its main header, causing many users to speculate that Cartoon Network had given up completely on Cartoon Orbit while some anticipated its closure. The same users pointed to the recent AP press release from Cartoon Network about developing a then-unnamed cartoon-based MMORPG as proof that Cartoon Orbit would soon be a thing of the past. Starting on September 29, 2006, users were no longer able to sign up for and create new Cartoon Orbit accounts. When clicking on the "Join Now" button, the user was instead presented with a "Registration is Closed" page.

Cartoon Orbit officially closed on the early morning of its closing date, October 16, 2006. The link that was placed at the bottom of the home page was redirected to Cartoon Network ¡Ya!, Cartoon Network's Spanish site; however, directly linking to their web address showed that Cartoon Orbit was still online. The following day, the login was removed from the homepage and anyone who tried logging in on another site page was disallowed. Today, all links to Cartoon Orbit now redirect to the CartoonNetwork.com homepage.

== Features ==
Players were given points to purchase stickers, called cToons, from the in-game store called the cMart. Players could receive cToons, gToons, and cRings (the game's assets) by entering special redemption codes, during special events, bartering with other players (trading), or in an auction format.

cToons came with a wide range of functionalities. Most were static, but some were animated and/or had sound. Other cToons, when clicked, played mini-games or had special functionality (such as a Dexter's Laboratory-themed cToon that automatically counted down to Albert Einstein's birthday).

Players were given their own gallery spaces, called cZones, to decorate with cards of their choice. One could further customize their cZone by changing their cZone's background.

=== Items ===
Three main collectibles were available in the Cartoon Orbit game: cToons, cRings, and gToons.

- cToons: An online trading card. cToon was short for Cartoon, just as eMail is short for Electronic Mail. They could be thought of as trading cards or more accurately e-stickers (as they could be displayed on a cZone). cToons could be plain, be animated, play sounds, or both. Some cToons were part of special sets, and developed their own names. These included:
  - Golden cToons: cToons that were gold in color; some of which were very rare.
  - Ad cToons: Sponsored advertisement cToons. Typically gained via a code, and some of which would disappear after the promotion ended, be changed to remove the advertisement logo, or replaced with a different cToon altogether.
  - Code cToons: cToons that were only available by entering a code, and after a designated amount of time, were expired. They could be found on Cartoon Network commercials, on promotional items, or at sponsor sites. Codes were revealed as part of on-air programming during Cartoon Cartoon Fridays and on Kids' WB.
  - Game cToons: cToons that, when placed on a cZone and clicked, opened a miniature Flash game. Some of them would give you a 'prize' code cToon at the end if you achieved a certain target.
  - Checklist cToons: cToons that, when placed on a cZone and clicked, were able to be printed off by the user so they would have a checklist of all the new cToons due to be released that month. New checklist cToons were created from November 2001 to June 2003.
  - Sticker cToons: Much like a traditional sticker, most had quotes or quips from the character portrayed. The majority of the sticker cToons were released in 2001.
  - Holiday cToons: First released at Christmas time in 2001, these quickly became some of the most popular cToons in Orbit. In 2002 and 2003, inexpensive Holiday presents were created which were meant to be freely given to other players. After Christmas, the present cToons were automatically exchanged for a real cToon.
  - Auction Only cToons: cToons that could only be purchased from Orbit Auctions.
- cRings: Much like a webring, cRings joined players together with a common theme. In the early years of Orbit, clicking on a cRing took you to another player's cZone that was displaying that cRing.
  - Blue Back cRings: Very rare cRings that got their name from the blue background they were created on.
- gToons: Cards used in the game of gToons.
  - Slam gToons: A rare type of gToon with special abilities.

=== gToons ===
The gToons logo.

gToons was Cartoon Orbit's own digital collectible card game extension. Launched on October 14, 2002, over 250,000 users had joined after the first month and over 400,000 users were playing after the first two months. gToons was discontinued alongside Cartoon Orbit on October 16, 2006, although it has been stated that it might return "as a stand-alone game sometime in the future with new sets of game pieces to collect".

In December 2007, gToons was revived as "Action Packs" for Transformers: Animated, followed by a Ben 10: Alien Force version becoming available in April 2008. Though the revival is now only available in a single-player mode, the rules and design are virtually identical to the original.

==== Gameplay ====
Players assembled decks composed of 12 cards each. Cards represented characters, places and props from shows broadcast on Cartoon Network, and each card had a color, value and occasionally a special effect that could modify the value(s) of other card(s). A game of gToons, which typically lasted about three minutes, involved two players strategically using seven gToons at a time to gain the most points by the game's end. Two colors (determined by the "bottom" card of each player's deck) were goal colors: if the two colors were both "neutral" colors (black or silver), the higher total point value won. If there was exactly one non-neutral color (blue, red, yellow, green, purple, etc.) between the goal colors, a player with more cards of the non-neutral color would receive a 15-point bonus to their total before determining victory. If neither color were neutral, a player could win by having more of each color in play than the opponent; otherwise, the higher total value won. Five separate expansion packs containing different gToons were released between 2003 and 2006.

=== Areas ===
- Challenge Zone: An area where players could challenge others to a game of gToons.
- cMart: An area where players could buy cards. Cards could be sorted by show, by character, by price, by type, by prop or by set. Most cToons did not stay in the cMart for long and were soon sold out.
- cZone: The part of the Cartoon Orbit site that belonged to the player. They could decorate their cZone with any of Orbit's cards like a gallery or sticker book.
- cZone Directory: Where players could find other people's cZones. They would type in their user name, find the name, or find it by letter. A cZone Spotlight listed particularly well-made cZones.
- Showcase cZone: An area where players could view new cToons, site updates, and the main Live Trading area.
- My Collection: An area where players could view their cards. Cards were able to be sorted into categories by show or by type. Players were able to hide their cards from trading or delete them.
- Auctions: A standard auction setup which allowed players to put cToons up for sale. The highest bidder at the end of the auction received the cToon, and the seller received the bid points minus a small fee. Auctions were introduced in August 2002.
- My Favorites: A section where players could visit someone's cZone and add them to a Buddy List. The Buddy List allowed players to see if the person they added was logged in. If they were logged in, they could choose to "follow" the other player and go to the section of the website that they were currently located at. The cZone Directory somewhat resembled this.
- Team Orbit: A group of 100 Cartoon Orbit players who were chosen to make suggestions about the game after it was released to the public. Team Orbit only lasted a few months in 2001, and it was replaced by the ideas and comments coming from numerous fan sites.
- ToonFlash Newsletter: A newsletter that Cartoon Orbit periodically sent out to all players via email.
