= Michael Ouweleen =

American television writer and media executive (born 1967)

- Born: 1967 (age 58–59)
- Occupations: Media executive; writer; producer
- Years active: 1996–present

Michael Ouweleen (born 1967) is an American media executive, writer, and producer.

== Career ==
By the mid-1990s, Ouweleen worked as copywriter of advertising company Korey, Kay & Partners. He became associate creative director at The Cartoon Network, Inc. in 1996. In 1998, Ouweleen became channel's senior vice president. He ran the network's content development and oversaw its programming in the mid-2000s. He co-created the animated television series Harvey Birdman, Attorney at Law and its spin-off Birdgirl, and is the executive producer of the 2006 television film Re-Animated. Ouweleen is married with three sons.

Ouweleen was named as the media company's CMO in 2014 and got promoted as interim president, chief executive officer (CEO) and chief operating officer (COO) in addition to Turner Classic Movies on November 27, 2019, due to the departure of Christina Miller. His stint as interim president ended on July 1, 2020, with the appointment of Tom Ascheim permanently to the position, and Ouweleen took the presidency of Adult Swim.

Following the Warner Bros. Discovery merger in May 2022, Ascheim left and the divisions under The Cartoon Network, Inc. (Cartoon Network, Adult Swim, and Boomerang) were moved into Warner Bros. Discovery Networks U.S., with Ouweleen regained the positions as company's president, CEO, and COO. He has also gained the role of president for Discovery Family.

In June 2023, Ouweleen gained the Business side of Turner Classic Movies, following another wave of layoffs at the Television section of Warner Bros. Discovery including the General Manager and President, Pola Changnon.

In November 2026, following the acquisition of Warner Bros. Discovery by Paramount Skydance, Skydance promoted Ouweleen as the CEO of the newly created unit Skydance Television Animation which would oversee the operations of Nickelodeon Animation Studios, Adult Swim, Cartoon Network, Warner Bros. Animation, Cartoon Network Studios, and Hanna-Barbera Studios Europe and the day-to-day oversight of Nickelodeon, Cartoon Network, Adult Swim, and Comedy Central.

Preceded by Christina Miller	The Cartoon Network, Inc. president, CEO, and COO; November 27, 2019–July 1, 2020 (Interim)	Succeeded by Tom Ascheim

Preceded by Tom Ascheim	The Cartoon Network, Inc. president, CEO, and COO; May 11, 2022–present	Succeeded by TBA
