= Cartoon Network Studios =

American animation studio

Cartoon Network Studios, Inc.
- Logo used since 2021

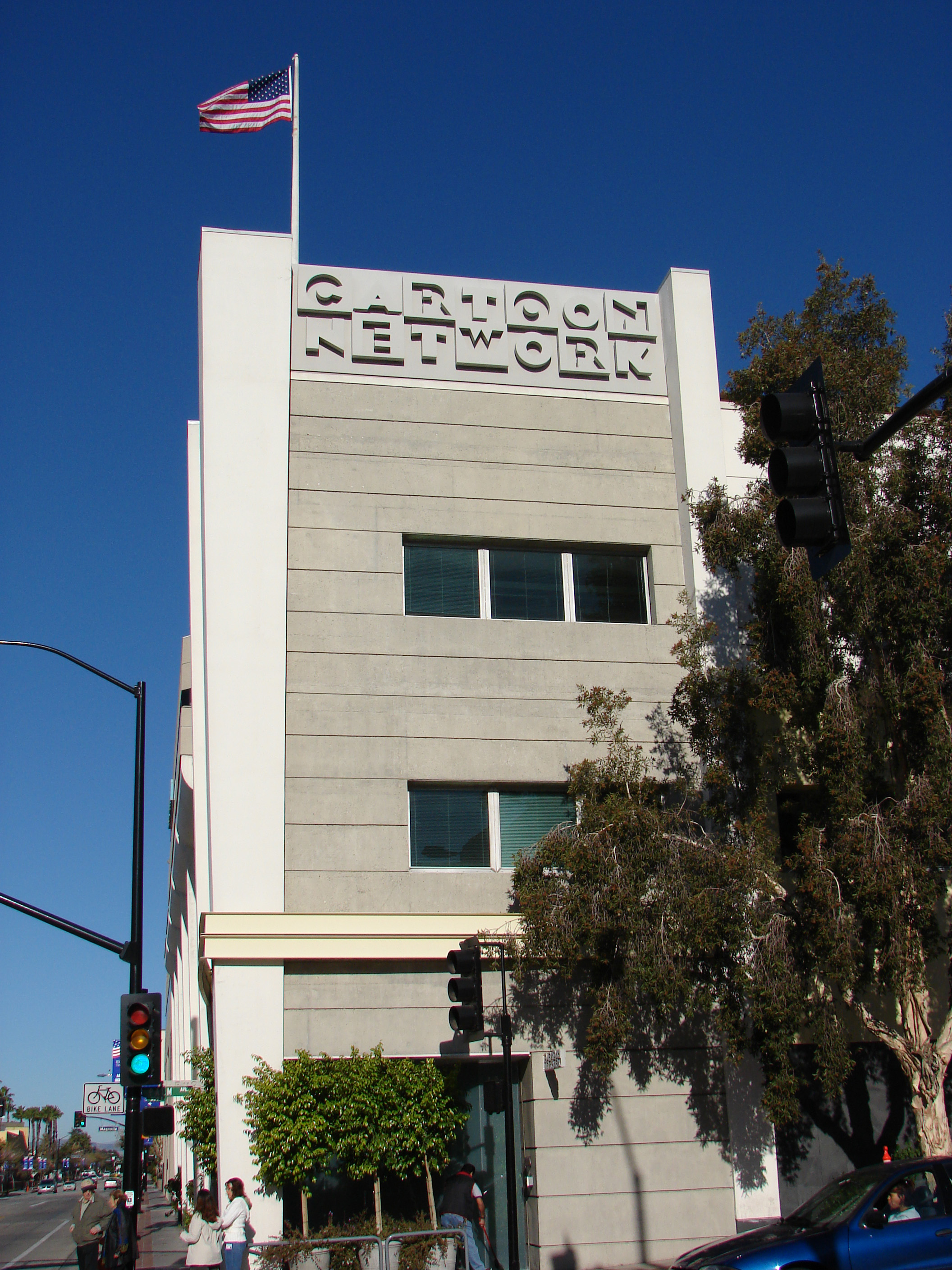
- Former headquarters located in Burbank, California; photographed in 2007.
- Type: Subsidiary
- Industry: Animation; Film production; Television production
- Predecessor: Hanna-Barbera
- Founded: October 21, 1994; 32 years ago
- Headquarters: Cahuenga Boulevard, Los Angeles, California, U.S. (1994–1998); Sherman Oaks Galleria, Sherman Oaks, Los Angeles, California, U.S. (1998–2000); 300 N 3rd St., Burbank, California, U.S. (2000–2023); 100 S California St., Burbank, California, U.S. (2023–present)
- Key people: Michael Ouweleen (president); Matt Matzkin (EVP/GM); Kelly Crews (SVP, production); Jay Bastian (SVP, current series); Audrey Diehl (SVP, kids/family); Jason DeMarco (SVP, action/anime series)
- Products: Television shows; Feature films
- Parent: Hanna-Barbera (1994–2001); Turner Broadcasting System (2001–2019); Warner Bros. Animation (2019–2026); Skydance Television Animation (2026–present)
- Divisions: Alive and Kicking, Inc.; Rent Now Productions; Factual Productions

Cartoon Network Studios, Inc. (abbreviated as CNS or CN Studios) is an American animation studio owned by the Skydance Television Animation division of Skydance. Founded in 1994 as a division of Hanna-Barbera, it primarily produces and develops animated programs and shorts for Cartoon Network and its programming blocks Adult Swim and Cartoonito, in addition to the streaming service HBO Max.

Notable shows produced by the studio include Dexter's Laboratory (Note: Seasons 3-4 only (Season 1 was labeled under "Cartoon Network Studios", but was actually produced at Hanna-Barbera).), Johnny Bravo (Note: Season 4 only.), The Powerpuff Girls (Note: Both original series (Seasons 5-6 only) and Reboot.), Samurai Jack, The Grim Adventures of Billy & Mandy, Evil Con Carne, Foster's Home for Imaginary Friends, Camp Lazlo, Ben 10, Chowder, The Marvelous Misadventures of Flapjack, Adventure Time, Regular Show, Uncle Grandpa, Steven Universe, Clarence, Over the Garden Wall, We Bare Bears, OK K.O.! Let's Be Heroes, Craig of the Creek, Summer Camp Island, and Infinity Train.

In 1996, Time Warner acquired Turner Broadcasting System, which owned Cartoon Network and Hanna-Barbera at that time. In 1997, Hanna-Barbera consolidated its operations with Warner Bros. Animation, moving into their facilities in 1998, where Cartoon Network Studios also operated briefly. Hanna-Barbera closed permanently in 2001, and Warner Bros. Animation has managed its intellectual property to this day, occasionally using the Hanna-Barbera brand as a label.

In 1999, Cartoon Network acquired a large building in Burbank, California, to serve as the headquarters for Cartoon Network Studios after its effective separation from Hanna-Barbera and Warner Bros. Animation. This was due to the need for Cartoon Network Studios to become an independent entity dedicated to creating original series, while Warner Bros. Animation focused on existing intellectual properties. The studio opened on May 22, 2000, and operated in those facilities for over 20 years.

In the 2020s, after multiple corporate mergers, the studio was consolidated into Warner Bros. Animation, and continued to operate as a separate division, although it was relocated to Second Century Development as the company's new headquarters on August 1, 2023. Sam Register, the president of both studios in Burbank, California, also leads Hanna-Barbera Studios Europe (formerly Cartoon Network Studios Europe) in London, England, alongside Vanessa Brookman.

== History ==
=== 1990s ===
In the 20th century, animation as a medium became popular on television. Hanna-Barbera became the premier studio for small-screen animated programs, launching a dominant series of Saturday-morning fare, including Scooby-Doo, The Flintstones, The Jetsons, and more. By the 1980s, cable television was developed, with businessman Ted Turner one of its pioneers. Turner founded several cable channels and also acquired vast film libraries, and in 1991, his company signed a joint deal to buy Hanna-Barbera. The Cartoon Network was developed as a cable outlet to air these animated properties, which largely consisted of reruns H-B productions. As the channel grew in subscribers, executives at the Atlanta-based company sought out original programming to supplement its catalog. Other animation-heavy cable channels, including Nickelodeon and Disney Channel, respectively founded Games Animation (now named Nickelodeon Animation Studio) and Walt Disney Television Animation as internal divisions to develop original programming. The network's first attempt at original content was Space Ghost Coast to Coast, with the division of Cartoon Network in charge switching to production of adult-focused programming as Williams Street.

Cartoon Network Studios originated in 1994 as a division of Hanna-Barbera that focused on producing original programming suitable for children for the network. Hanna-Barbera had been located on Cahuenga Boulevard in Los Angeles since 1963, and housed the studio, its archives, and its extensive animation art collection. Its first productions included What a Cartoon! (1995), an anthology series of short subjects serving as pilots for new CN programs. The first of these, Dexter's Laboratory, launched in 1996 and was an immediate success, with creator Genndy Tartakovsky becoming a longtime associate of the company. The same year, Turner Broadcasting System was merged with Time Warner, and Hanna-Barbera closed its Cahuenga campus, relocating to Sherman Oaks Galleria in nearby Sherman Oaks, where Warner Bros. Animation was located. Over the course of this transition, the Cartoon Network Studios branding was briefly phased out, with newer programs, including Johnny Bravo (1997) and The Powerpuff Girls (1998).

=== 2000s ===
On July 21, 1999, Cartoon Network officially started the studio to separate itself from the complete folding of Hanna-Barbera into WBA. Following the death of the studio's co-founder William Hanna in 2001, Cartoon Network Studios took over the animation function of Hanna-Barbera. The network acquired a three-story 43,000-square-foot facility located at 300 N 3rd St. in Burbank, California to house its new offices, previously a commercial bakery, and prior to that, the location of a Pacific Bell telephone exchange. According to Cartoon Brew, the network spent around $1.2 million to renovate the building. The network took counsel from its top cartoonists, Genndy Tartakovsky and Craig McCracken, on the site of its new studio, as well as design proposals for its offices.

In March 2000, the network began to transfer its production offices, and on May 22, 2000, the studio was christened by veteran animator and animation advisor Joseph Barbera with a bottle of champagne. The building's official opening came on August 24, 2000; former DiC and Nickelodeon employees Brian A. Miller and Jennifer Pelphrey were hired to manage the studio. Mike Lazzo, then head of programming and development, designed a pirate flag, with a skull bearing the channel logo in its teeth, that flew over the building for several weeks before local police threatened action over its lack of permit; this logo was later to be used by the network for its nighttime programming block Adult Swim. Its artists quickly took to its stairwell with doodles and other graffiti that filled over its twenty-year history; it was also home to a mural by artist Ian Anderson titled Mazeway to Heaven. The first new productions at the new offices included Samurai Jack and Time Squad (both 2001). In 2001, Lazzo called the studio "the Termite Terrace of today."

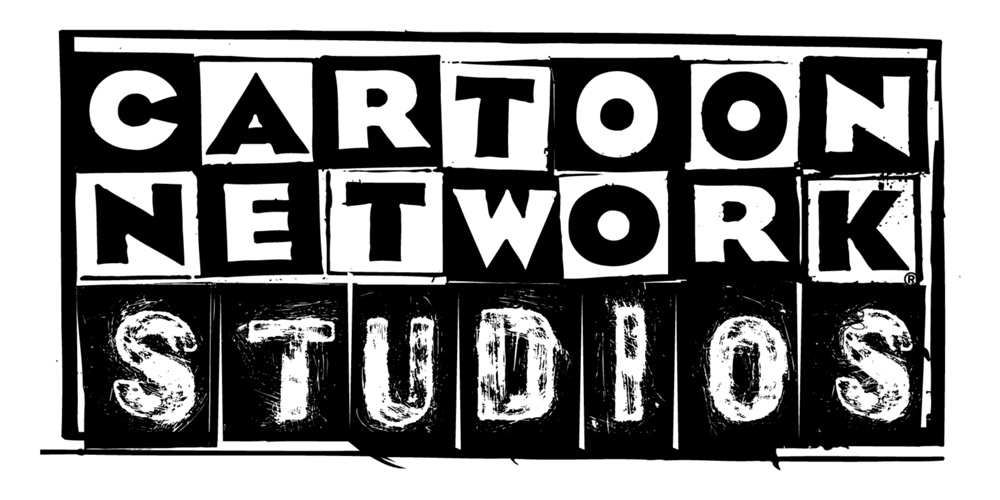
Logo used from 2001 to 2012

In 2002, the studio produced two television pilots for Adult Swim, Welcome to Eltingville and The Groovenians, neither of which were picked up as a full series. Also, the studio released this year its only theatrical film to date: The Powerpuff Girls Movie, based on The Powerpuff Girls, which received positive reviews from critics, but was a commercial failure for Warner Bros. Pictures at the box office. In 2006, CNS collaborated with sister studio Williams Street for the first time for Korgoth of Barbaria, a television pilot made for Adult Swim, which was also not green-lit as a series.

In 2007, CNS began its first foray into live-action with the hybrid series Out of Jimmy's Head, and then its first fully live-action project, a television film, Ben 10: Race Against Time, and its sequel, Ben 10: Alien Swarm, along with the television pilots Locker 514, Siblings and Stan the Man. The studio's first live-action series Tower Prep would arrive in 2010. Former New Line Television producer Mark Costa was hired to oversee the projects and CNS' live-action production company Alive and Kicking, Inc.. Incredible Crew was the last series in that genre the studio produced for Cartoon Network. Despite the failure of live-action on the channel, the studio's infrastructure was retained to produce live-action fare for sibling programming block Adult Swim, identifying on-air as Alive and Kicking, along with two other companies (Rent Now Productions and Factual Productions), instead of using the Cartoon Network Studios banner.

=== 2010s ===
Logo used from 2010 to 2015

On April 5, 2010, Adventure Time premiered on Cartoon Network; the same series began life as a short featured on Nicktoons' Random! Cartoons that was ultimately not green-lit as a series by that channel. Cartoon Network picked it up later, and production of the show moved to CNS. The series lasted until 2018 with 10 seasons and 283 episodes. A film was announced in 2015, but in 2018 Adam Muto said that the film was never officially announced. In 2019, a continuation, titled Adventure Time: Distant Lands, was announced for HBO Max with a release in 2020. Also this year, The Cartoonstitute, an incubator series similar to What a Cartoon!, debuted on Cartoon Network Video. The pilots of Regular Show and Uncle Grandpa were presented here along with other shorts, with the Uncle Grandpa pilot also serving as a basis for Secret Mountain Fort Awesome, which preceded the actual series.

Logo used from 2013 to 2026

In 2014, CNS produced its first miniseries, Over the Garden Wall. The following year, Long Live the Royals was also premiered. In 2016, the studio produced two reboots based on The Powerpuff Girls and Ben 10 respectively. Also, the studio produced its first television series based on a series of online shorts, Mighty Magiswords.

In 2017, after plans as old as 2002 for a film did not materialize, Samurai Jack was revived for a fifth and final season, which the studio returned to produce for Adult Swim, to critical acclaim, concluding the series after its cancellation from Cartoon Network in 2004. Also this year, it was announced that CNS, in collaboration with Studio T, would produce the adult animated series Close Enough for TBS, created by Regular Show creator J. G. Quintel.

In 2019, after handling a few episodes of Harvey Birdman, Attorney at Law, the second season of Black Dynamite, the above-mentioned fifth season of Samurai Jack and producing the above-mentioned television pilots Welcome to Eltingville, The Groovenians and Korgoth of Barbaria, CNS produced its first full program for Adult Swim: Primal, an adult animated series from Genndy Tartakovsky. The first five episodes were also packaged for a limited theatrical release as a feature film titled Primal: Tales of Savagery.

CNS also began to produce content for parent company WarnerMedia's upcoming streaming service HBO Max, including Adventure Time: Distant Lands. After the failure of its planned animation block, Close Enough was also shifted from TBS to HBO Max. In the 2010s, the studio began to outgrow its original building, and began to rent space in other facilities in the Burbank Media Center district.

=== 2020s ===
In August 2020, WBA president Sam Register was appointed head of the CNS. Amy Friedman was named head of programming for Cartoon Network after Rob Sorcher resigned his roles as head of the studio and chief content officer, and switched to Warner Bros. Television Group for an overall production deal.

In August 2021, Jason DeMarco was named SVP for Anime & Action Series/Longform for WBA and CNS, and CNS Europe was renamed Hanna-Barbera Studios Europe as a tribute to the original Hanna-Barbera studio.

On May 11, 2022, after Tom Ascheim exited his role as president and departed, the Warner Bros. Global Kids, Young Adults and Classics division was broken up as part of a restructuring by new owner Warner Bros. Discovery and its studios—including CNS—were moved directly under Warner Bros. Television. On October 11, CNS and WBA consolidated their development and production teams as part of a restructuring by Warner Bros. Television, with Audrey Diehl overseeing kids and family, Peter Girardi overseeing adult animation, and Sammy Perlmutter overseeing animated long-form productions. The merger would not impact their output as labels, with CNS continuing to focus on original content and WBA used for classic franchises.

On July 9, 2023, Miller announced via Twitter that the Cartoon Network Studios Burbank building would close its doors on August 1, with all operations being transferred to WBA as both CNS and WBA would be moving to the new Warner Bros. Second Century building. While unconfirmed, Amid Amidi of Cartoon Brew reported its production teams would move to the Second Century Development, a pair of buildings with over 800,000 square feet of office space, just adjacent to the Warner Bros. lot. On December 5, it was revealed that Hollywood Production Center had moved into the CN Burbank building. Brian A. Miller revealed that HPC has always owned the building, and Cartoon Network had a long-term lease.

In August 2026, it was announced that Register would be leaving his position as head of CNS as well as WBA and HBSE after Warner Bros. Television Studios and Register decided to not renew the contract.

In November 2026, it was announced that the studio, alongside sister studios Warner Bros. Animation and Hanna-Barbera Studios Europe, will be integrated in the new division Skydance Television Animation, which would include Adult Swim and newly-acquired Nickelodeon Animation Studios. This also coincided with the return of Michael Ouweleen as the division's newest CEO.

== See also ==
- List of programs broadcast by Cartoon Network
- List of animation studios owned by Warner Bros. Discovery
  - Hanna-Barbera Productions - former owner and predecessor of Cartoon Network Studios
  - Hanna-Barbera Studios Europe - former European sister studio of Cartoon Network Studios
  - Warner Bros. Animation - parent of Cartoon Network Studios
  - Williams Street - former sister studio of Cartoon Network Studios
