= Alice in Wonderland (Disneyland attraction) =

Dark ride in Fantasyland at Disneyland

Coordinates: 33.8132°N 117.9185°W

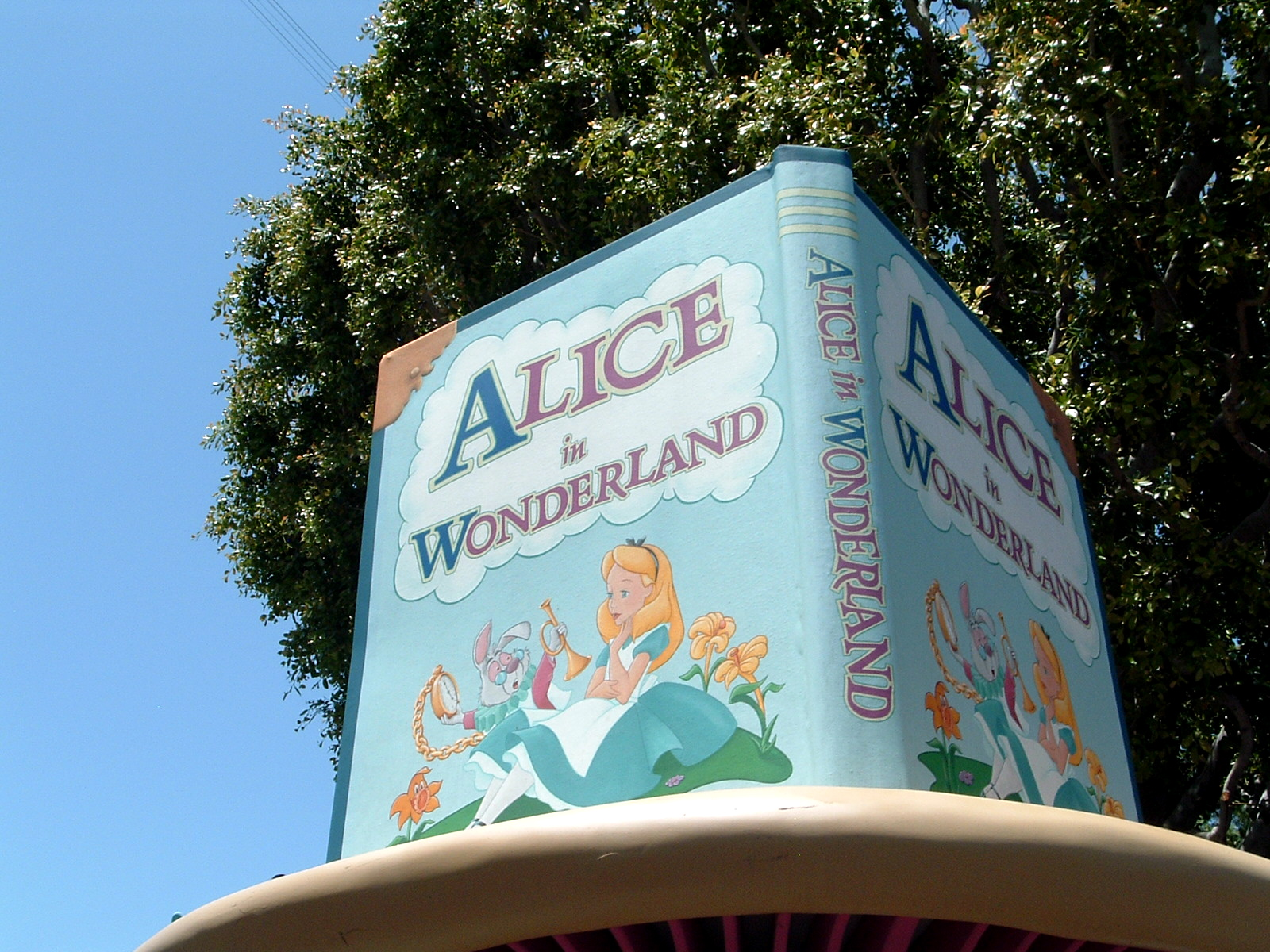

Disneyland
- Area: Fantasyland
- Status: Operating
- Opening date: June 14, 1958

Ride statistics
- Attraction type: Dark ride
- Manufacturer: Arrow Development
- Designer: WED Enterprises
- Theme: Alice in Wonderland
- Vehicle type: Caterpillar
- Duration: 3:38
- Must transfer from wheelchair

Alice in Wonderland is a dark ride in Fantasyland at Disneyland in Anaheim, California. Based on the 1951 animated Disney film of the same name, the attraction resides next to a second ride, the Mad Tea Party, based on a scene in that same adaptation.

The ride opened in 1958; the present version opened in 1984, and was updated in 2014.

== History ==
Among the many unrealized concepts brought forth during the early stages of Disneyland's development was an intricately detailed, Fantasyland-based walk-through attraction themed around 1951's Alice in Wonderland. The attraction would have seen guests visiting physical adaptations of nearly every scene in the motion picture, each one featuring some zany gag (often reminiscent of traditional carnival funhouses) such as a forced-perspective "shrinking" effect within the corridors of the rabbit hole and rotating platforms circling Dodo's rock that would have simulated the caucus race. The idea of a walk-through exhibit was eventually scrapped, however, as it was decided that guests proceeding at too slow a pace would inevitably cause traffic hold-ups. An Alice dark ride was then considered as a remedy to this issue, but as a result of strict time and budgetary constraints, the idea was shelved, and the space originally designated to house the attraction would instead be occupied by the Mickey Mouse Club Theatre.

The Alice in Wonderland dark ride concept would resurface in late 1957, when legacy Disney artist and Imagineer Claude Coats (a chief art director of the film along with Mary Blair) was tasked with designing such an attraction. Made possible by the aid of Ken Anderson, Collin Campbell, and Blaine Gibson (all of whom had worked on the film), as well as the talent of special effects engineer Bob Gurr, the ride was finished in under a year's time and opened to the public on June 14, 1958, complete with a televised ribbon-cutting ceremony featuring Mousketeer Karen Pendleton dressed as Alice.

Alice in Wonderland differed in quite a few ways from the original three dark rides that had opened in Fantasyland along with the rest of the park three years prior. The ride space was restricted to an oddly shaped extension built onto the rear of the complex housing Mr. Toad's Wild Ride and Peter Pan's Flight, an arrangement which resulted in Alice being the first dark ride at Disneyland to occupy two floors. As the attraction's multiple-story configuration could not accommodate a normal loading queue, guests boarded their ride vehicles directly adjacent to a huge outdoor garden consisting of enormous, stylized vines and blades of grass (each constructed of fiberglass and rendered in a variety of pastel colors such as pink and purple) towering over a bed of multi-colored gravel and small shrubs, along with four looming dandelion-shaped light fixtures. Suspended over and amid this garden was a large, winding ramp constructed to appear like a gigantic vine; as guests exited the show building from the second floor, this ramp allowed their ride vehicles to descend back to the ground and return to the loading queue.

The 1951 feature film proved to lend itself well to the format of a themed dark ride. Just as Alice made her way through a linear series of distinct, largely unrelated episodes in the motion picture, guests in the attraction were shuttled through separate, clearly defined scenes by way of a rail-guided fiberglass ride vehicle. These vehicles, modeled to resemble the film's haughty, hookah-smoking caterpillar, were manufactured by Arrow Development and designed with three wheels instead of the usual four to facilitate navigation along the ride's sloping track. The iconic "caterpillar cars" have remained in use for the entire duration of the attraction's existence as of 2025. Much in the same vein as Mr. Toad's Wild Ride, Peter Pan's Flight and Snow White's Enchanted Wish, Alice in Wonderland saw guests navigating boxy corridors illuminated with ultraviolet fluorescents and populated by lavishly painted plywood "flats" representing scenery and characters.

One notable trait shared across all of the original Fantasyland dark rides was the deliberate absence of each story's titular character; this was true for Alice in Wonderland as well; Alice herself was nowhere to be found within the ride. Guests were rather made to assume the perspective of Alice themselves, a concept accentuated through the use of brief "storybook-style" narrations delivered by an unseen Alice (portrayed by Kathryn Beaumont, her voice actress from the film) at the beginning of each scene. These narrations might have provided the impression of an older Alice recounting her episodes in Wonderland as guests witnessed them "first-hand" from her point of view.

Largely due to the technological limitations of the era, a number of creative liberties were taken in portraying the various scenes from the film in an attempt to make them more entertaining and madcap, with unique scenarios such as the "Upside-Down Room" and the "Oversized Room" plainly contradicting the events of the original story. Limited ride space meant that many stand-out characters and locales from the film (most notably the Queen of Hearts, Tweedledee & Tweedledum and the Caterpillar) were absent from the attraction, and even the scenes that were present were not necessarily arranged in chronological order. All of this resulted in a ride experience that could have been interpreted as unfaithful to the film (albeit intentionally) and only tangentially related to the original 1865 novel by Lewis Carroll. Much more so than the current attraction, the original Alice dark ride was largely a series of out-of-context iconography from the film presented in new and odd ways.

Very few alterations were made to the original Alice in Wonderland ride during its quarter-century lifespan. Various character props were repainted and rebuilt to appear more (or less) on-model with their film counterparts throughout the 1960s and 1970s, but the attraction received next to no considerable changes until it was closed in 1982 to make way for a drastic overhaul in accordance with the New Fantasyland project—a total re-imagining of Fantasyland in which the majority of the section's architecture and attractions were updated with richer, more intricate theming and superior technology. Although New Fantasyland opened to the public at large in May 1983, Alice's refurbishment process was so extensive that it would not be ready to unveil until April 1984. This revamped version of the attraction is largely the same ride that exists today.

Among the updates made to the attraction during its excessive redesign were the omission of several sets in favor of scenes better reflecting the events of the film, the addition of fully dimensional animated figures and scenery replacing the original plywood flats, and the inclusion of various characters from the film that the original ride notably lacked. Additionally, a small extension of the ride building to the right side of the loading queue that had been used for vehicle maintenance was demolished to make way for a new ending scene, which is isolated from the rest of the attraction by the winding vine ramp. The ride also received interior soundproofing to prevent audio from bleeding through the set walls as it had previously, as well as an entirely original soundtrack featuring re-orchestrated music, new character voices, and new dialogue from Kathryn Beaumont reprising her role as Alice.

The exterior garden was given a significant overhaul as well, as the original gravel, shrubs, and colorful fiberglass sculptures were replaced with actual flowerbeds, topiary heart designs, decorative hedges, and several imported trees, including a gigantic ficus serving as a centerpiece of sorts. Oversized fiberglass leaves and flowers still remained, albeit in far more modest sizes and quantities. The masonry veneer of the ride building itself received a visual upgrade as well, with added texture and detailed mouldings.

Alice in Wonderland closed without warning on July 15, 2010, for maintenance concerning the exterior vine ramp, which was discovered to violate regulations set in place by California's OSHA department as it lacked handrails for workers. The attraction reopened a month later on August 13, now with a temporary safety platform featuring side railings installed directly underneath the vine ramp, as well as a series of tarps "camouflaged" to appear as stylized vegetation curtaining off most of the queue garden.

On March 10, 2014, the attraction closed once more to undergo mild refurbishments both outside and inside. Most obvious were the removal of the vine ramp's temporary safety platform and hanging tarps, and the subsequent widening of the vine ramp itself along with the addition of decorative, permanent railings along its left side. Interior alterations included reworked gags in several scenes, the addition of many new holographically projected animations, and several animated figures of Alice herself. The ride reopened with these changes in place on July 4, 2014.

== 1958 version ==
Upon boarding a fiberglass caterpillar car, guests proceeded past the enormous vines and dandelions looming over the gravel garden before entering the grey, cavernous maw of the rabbit hole and plunging into darkness. Soon, the voice of Kathryn Beaumont reprising her role as Alice was heard through hidden speakers: "My adventures in Wonderland began when I followed the White Rabbit down the rabbit hole. All of a sudden, I fell! Down, down..."

Light returned as guests passed through a set of black crash doors into the attraction's first exhibit, the Upside-Down Room. This spacious black-light chamber, set within the home of the White Rabbit, was characterized by a plethora of stylized furniture fixed upside-down to the ceiling, with the ceiling itself painted to resemble a wooden floor decorated with patterned rugs. Upon entering the room, guests viewed their upside-down reflections in the circular mirror of a ceiling-bound dresser as Alice's voice was heard once again: "The next thing I knew, I was in the Upside-Down Room—with the floor where the ceiling should be." Passing under tables and chairs of various designs, as well as flower vases, bookshelves, gas lamps, and even an occupied fish bowl, the White Rabbit was heard singing I'm Late before swinging upside-down into a doorway at the far end of the room with his trumpet in hand. Guests' caterpillar car then performed a sharp turn into the opposite direction and continued toward a tall fireplace (the same one seen in the film as Alice descends the rabbit hole) complete with flickering fabric flames and a hanging, upside-down tea kettle.

Exiting the Upside-Down Room through the wall left of the fireplace, guests found themselves in the Oversized Room (referred to as "Through the Key Hole" on the attraction's original poster), a sixteen-foot-tall chamber set within the depths of the rabbit hole, where in the film Alice encountered the talking doorknob. This interpretation of the scene was quite different, however, as although the illusion of shrinking to a minuscule size was preserved by means of gargantuan furniture props, there was no glass table here as there was in the film—rather a giant flat of the Cheshire Cat situated atop a suitably large footstool.

As soon as guests entered the Oversized Room, Alice again intervened with a short narration, this time with a slight flavor of worry audible in her voice: "I was getting smaller, and smaller, and smaller!" Guests were carried toward the oversized footstool (to the left of which was a towering fifteen-foot flat of an armchair, and to the rear a massive table topped with a tea pot and tea cup) as the Cheshire Cat laughed ceaselessly above. As his pupils were convex on his subtly recessed sclerae, his eyes appeared to stare guests down as they passed directly under him. Now beneath the footstool, guests' caterpillar car swerved suddenly as the grinning feline appeared once more, swinging down from above the stool as a smaller, silhouette-like figure, his piercing yellow eyes still following riders' movement. Guests then advanced toward the huge living doorknob (whose brass plate spanned the entire back wall of the room) wordlessly peering down at them before continuing straight through his gaping key-hole mouth and into the next scene.

"And then, I found myself in a beautiful garden of live flowers," Alice recounted as riders came upon the forest-like patch of looming, sentient flora. It was at this point that the track began a long, gradual ascent to the second floor of the show building, with the path of guests' caterpillar cars becoming a vine-like surface suspended above the floor. In the garden, a wealth of larger-than-life anthropomorphic flowers—roses, irises, lilies, daffodils, pansies, and other blossoms—swayed gently in tune to the lyrics of All in the Golden Afternoon. All around were huge, stylized leaves and blades of grass rendered in hues of green and turquoise and propped against abstract, gold-tinted backdrops. As guests approached the end of the garden, a concealed "dandy-lion" shot up from beyond the edge of the elevated vine to roar at guests. Riders then veered toward the right, passed through a set of doors disguised as foliage, and made their way into the Tulgey Wood.

"Ooh! The Tulgey Wood... It certainly was brillig." The original iteration of the Tulgey Wood scene was very stark relative to what it would become in 1984, essentially being a series of enormous tree branches and leaves set against an empty black void. In keeping with the trend of gargantuan scenery, each strange bird and plywood bit of vegetation within this scene was rendered with intimidating proportions, despite the fact that Alice, in the film, had grown back to her normal size well before becoming lost in the Tulgey Wood. Heard all around but never seen was the Cheshire Cat, reciting the first verse of Jabberwocky much as he does in the motion picture.

Upon entering the wood, guests first approached ten glowing pairs of red, cut-out eyes staring from the dark, whose pupils would "follow" each caterpillar car veering out of the way into a swift hairpin turn. Guests then continued toward an accordion owl (which extended and retracted its musical neck) resting below a gigantic wooden sign reading "TULGEY WOOD," on top of which was perched a spectacle bird. Ahead were the bird-cage bird (whose cage body contained two fluttering fledglings, both of which were kept in use after the 1984 overhaul), a jumping umbrella vulture, several honking horn ducks, and a pair of pencil woodpeckers perched near another oversized wooden sign, this one labeled "Mad Hatter." Now having reached the upper level of the ride building, guests passed through another camouflaged set of crash doors and into the attraction's final main exhibit.

Guests now found themselves in the Mad Tea Party scene, as evident by the sounds of The Unbirthday Song and yet another wooden sign, this one marked "Tea Party" and pointing to the right. Here, the right-hand wall was painted with the backs of chairs propped against the green hedge enclosing the party, while to the left was a giant flat of a tea pot in the middle of the table, as well as a towering stack of four fully dimensional tea cups (each on its own saucer) all gyrating precariously.

Navigating among the crockery, several cups of tea blocking guests' path swung out of the way before their caterpillar car drew near to the edge of the table, beyond which were the Mad Hatter and the March Hare—both rendered as monstrously sized flats donning crazed expressions. Situated in front of a forced-perspective mural offering a glimpse of a stone path leading into the distant woods and an array of hanging paper lanterns, the party's unhinged duo of hosts popped up suddenly to shout, "Move down! Move down! Move down!" as guests rounded the animated tower of tea cups and began down the other side of the table. One final character, the Dormouse, then emerged from an enormous, flat sugar jar and drowsily commented, "Very very rude indeed..." before guests smashed straight through a tea pot and careened into a black void.

Immediately, guests' senses were assaulted by a loud cymbal crash and a series of starburst patterns illuminated via strobe lights. Accompanied by the sounds of shattering glass and other clamor, Alice was heard gasping in shock before delivering her final, inconclusive narration: "Oh dear... How do I get out? Wha- I've lost my way!" Guests were then carried past a series of confusing, brightly colored directional signs (more or less the same ones seen in the film prior to the introduction of the Cheshire Cat) reading "Yonder," "Go Back," "This Way Out," and other useless instructions. All was silent for a brief interval before guests plowed through three consecutive sets of wooden doors, each one smaller than the previous and coupled with an identical Goofy yell (as voiced by Pinto Colvig) of increasingly higher pitch. A final fourth set of doors, painted entirely black save for a minimalist keyhole in the center, then parted to a different, especially outlandish scream as guests' caterpillar car emerged from the show building. (This final yell in particular, from the 1951 Goofy short Hello Aloha, is still used at the corresponding point in the current version of the attraction.)

Navigating down the winding, vine-shaped ramp suspended amid the exterior garden, guests eventually reached the grey pavement at ground level and turned toward the unloading station.

== 1984 version ==
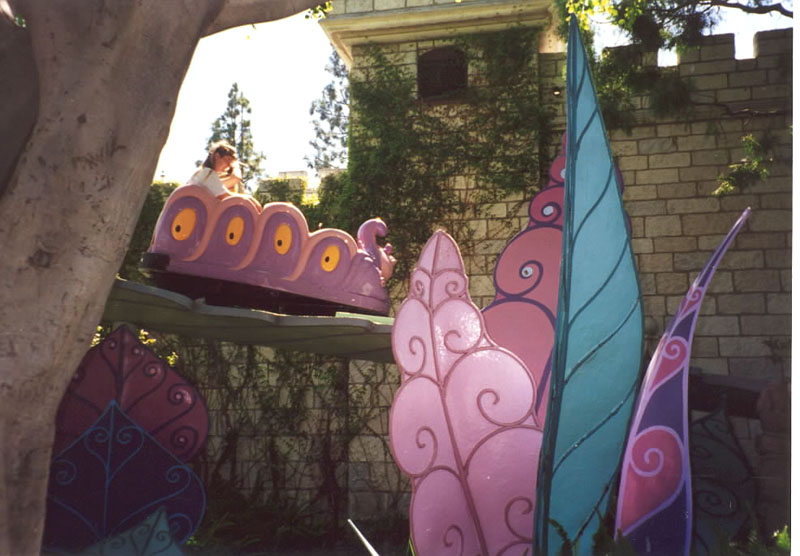
A guest riding the Alice in Wonderland ride in 1996.

Guests ride in caterpillar vehicles down the rabbit hole. Pieces of furniture, framed art, and vases swirl around as guests "fall" down the tunnel. As guests enter past the Doorknob, they see the White Rabbit running off with Alice in pursuit. Guests then pass by Tweedle Dee and Tweedle Dum and encounter the White Rabbit, worrying about being late.

Next, the guests go through the garden of live flowers, who sing "All in the Golden Afternoon". Riders then pass the Caterpillar, who blows smoky letters and asks "Who are you?". The Tiger Lily replies, thinking that Alice and the guests are weeds and pouts in disgust, while a Dandelion pops up and roars. Next, guests enter the Tulgey Wood, where they and Alice meet the Cheshire Cat, as well as a pencil bird, an accordion owl, an eyeglasses bird, a horn-shaped duck with its ducklings, an umbrella bird, a cage bird, and a pair of hammer birds nailing signs to a tree. They then go through the hedge maze and past some singing playing-cards who are painting a white rose tree red, splashing nearby bushes with paint. The White Rabbit announces the Queen of Hearts (and the King) and she plays croquet, using a flamingo as a club and a hedgehog as a ball. The King tells the guests: "Rule 42: The Queen always wins" and the hedgehog ends up rolling into a rose tree. The guests then enter the Courtroom and the Queen orders their execution while a brigade of playing-cards leap towards the guests. Riders escape by pushing their way through the courtroom doors past two guards poised to attack.

The vehicles then leave the ride building's second floor and descend down a winding path on a giant vine past the ride queue, before heading to the final scene at the Mad Tea Party. After the Mad Hatter and March Hare sing "A Very Merry UnBirthday", Alice proclaims that it is her unbirthday too. The White Rabbit ducks as a giant unbirthday cake with a dynamite candle explodes and the ride vehicles exit to the unload area.

== Ride vehicle ==
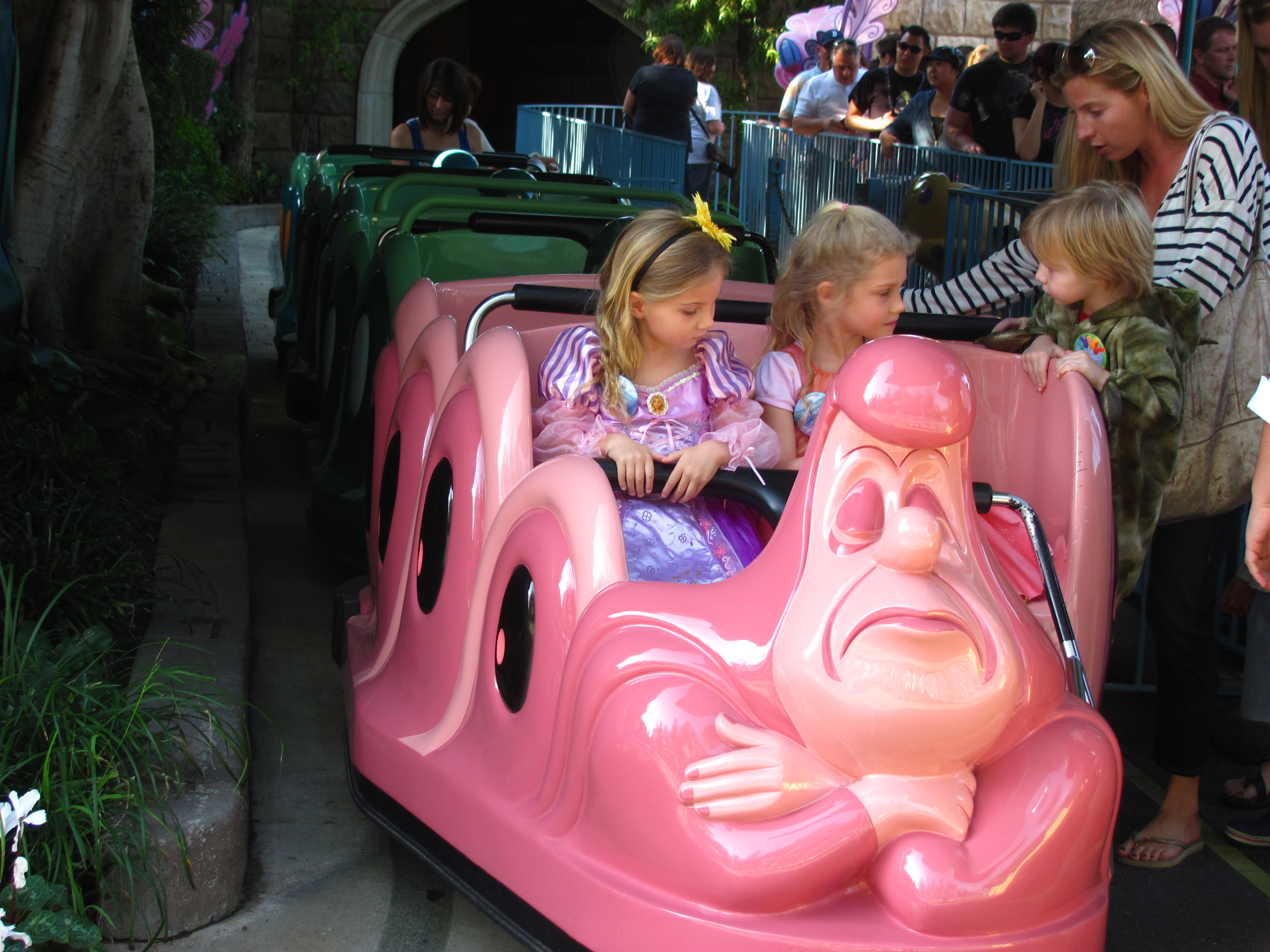
A caterpillar ride vehicle from the attraction.

Prior to the Caterpillar car, Imagineer Claude Coats had proposed a ride vehicle made out of the various playing card soldiers from the film, with the front-facing card donning a similar facial expression to what is worn by the aloof Caterpillar now. Walt Disney disapproved this concept, suggesting instead a vehicle modeled after the Caterpillar. Upon completing the design for the new Caterpillar car, Coats was informed by Disney's legal department that he needed to apply for a patent for the vehicle. Coats attempted to convince them that the patent belonged to Walt Disney, who had suggested the vehicle's design, though the department insisted that it was Coats who was ultimately responsible for the look of it, as he had actually drawn the car. Coats applied for the patent on May 8, 1959, and it was approved by the United States Patent Office on January 12, 1960. It is designated as patent #187,036 and had a term of 14 years. A few days after the patent was approved, the legal team returned to Coats and told him to sell his patent to them for $10, which he did. Coats' son, Alan Coats, still has the original patent paperwork in his possession.

== Voice Cast ==
- Alice - Kathryn Beaumont
- White Rabbit/Tweedledee and Tweedledum/Playing Cards/Mad Hatter - Corey Burton
- Doorknob/Caterpillar/Cheshire Cat/King of Hearts/March Hare - Tony Pope
- Flowers/Tiger Lilly/Queen of Hearts - Linda Gary
- Ace of Clubs - Thurl Ravenscroft

== See also ==
- Mad Tea Party
