= Ken Anderson (animator) =

American art director and animator (1909–1993)

- Anderson in 1977
- Born: March 17, 1909; Seattle, Washington, U.S.
- Died: December 13, 1993 (aged 84); La Cañada Flintridge, California, U.S.
- Education: University of Washington (BArch)
- Occupations: Animator; art director; layout artist; storyboard artist; concept artist; character designer; visual development artist
- Years active: 1933–1992
- Spouse: Polly (m. 1934)
- Children: 3

Kenneth B. "Ken" Anderson (March 17, 1909 – December 13, 1993) was an American animator, art director, and storyboard artist for The Walt Disney Company. He had been named by Walt Disney as his "jack of all trades".

Born in Seattle, Anderson studied architecture at the University of Washington. He later studied at the École des Beaux-Arts and the American Academy in Rome. When he returned to the United States, Anderson worked for six weeks at Metro-Goldwyn-Mayer (MGM) before joining the Disney studios in 1934. He worked as an inbetweener and was later promoted to an animator. His first major assignment was the Silly Symphonies short film Three Orphan Kittens (1935). He later moved to the layout department. For Snow White and the Seven Dwarfs (1937), Anderson designed layouts, experimented with the multiplane camera, and built a model of the dwarfs' cottage.

Anderson served again as an art director on Pinocchio (1940) and Fantasia (1940) for "The Pastoral Symphony" Segment. Anderson worked closely with Mary Blair in adapting her visual style for The Three Caballeros (1945) and Song of the South (1946). He also worked on the story development for Melody Time (1948), So Dear to My Heart (1948), and Cinderella (1950).

During the 1950s, Anderson joined Walt Disney Imagineering (WDI), then known as WED Enterprises, in which he designed several Fantasyland "dark rides" for the Disneyland theme park. He subsequently worked as a production designer on Sleeping Beauty (1959) and introduced the xerography technique for One Hundred and One Dalmatians (1961). He later contributed background and character designs for The Jungle Book (1967), The Aristocats (1970), Robin Hood (1973), The Rescuers (1977), and Pete's Dragon (1977). He retired in 1978, but he rejoined WED Enterprises a year later to help renovate Fantasyland. On December 13, 1993, Anderson died from a stroke.

== Early life and education ==
Anderson was born in Seattle on March 17, 1909. He was the son of Luther Anderson Sr., a lumber merchant, and Ethel Way. He had two sisters, Ruth and Roberta. When Anderson was three years old, his family moved to the Philippines (then a territory of the United States). While sailing back to the United States in 1919, his father died from malaria, leaving the family destitute. Anderson's sister, Ruth, also died during this time. Anderson's mother sent him to live with his uncle who abused him, which forced him to run away and lived in the woods. "I figured life was too damn hard," he recalled, "so I found a log cabin and caught 127 trout for my dinner and lived there for a month before they found me." Meanwhile, Anderson's mother Ethel finished her training as a schoolteacher and was hired for a teaching position in Seattle. His mother reclaimed him, and at age twelve, he began working several minor jobs to put himself through school.

Anderson studied architecture at the University of Washington. He then won a scholarship where he studied at the École des Beaux-Arts at Fontainebleu in Fontainebleau, France, to which he claimed no one west of the Mississippi River had obtained before. He later studied at the American Academy in Rome for two and a half years. Anderson returned to the United States in 1933 during the Great Depression.

== Career ==
=== 1933–1942: the Silly Symphonies, Snow White and the Seven Dwarfs, Fantasia ===
Due to a scarcity in architectural jobs, Anderson worked at Metro-Goldwyn-Mayer (MGM) on The Painted Veil (1934) and What Every Woman Knows (1934) for six weeks as a set designer. He recalled his time at MGM was "a most unhappy experience" and his wife was "fed up with our living on credit." One day, when Anderson and his wife Polly were driving around the Disney studios near Hyperion Avenue, she said, "Why don't you go in there and get a job?" He refused at first, to which she fought back: "You need a job. We've got to have a job. We're living off these canned beans down at the beach and we can't keep doing that."

Anderson returned to the studio and showed Walt Disney his watercolor architectural paintings, which impressed Disney. The next day, he was given a two weeks' apprenticeship in the inbetween department. Polly herself worked as a painter in the Ink and Paint department for three years until she became pregnant with her first daughter. On September 3, 1934, Anderson began working as an inbetweener doing fill-in scenes with other junior animators, including Milt Kahl, Ollie Johnston, Frank Thomas, Jack Hannah, and James Algar. His first projects were the Silly Symphonies short films, including The Goddess of Spring (1934) and Three Little Wolves (1936), and Mickey's Polo Team (1936).

Disney admired Anderson's skill in perspective drawing and selected him to animate on the Silly Symphonies short Three Orphan Kittens (1935). Anderson recalled, "[Walt Disney] gave me several scenes in Three Orphan Kittens, in which I animated the kittens and the backgrounds. The camera traveled along with the kittens at their eye level to show the surroundings as they saw it." The short won the 1935 Academy Award for Best Short Subject (Cartoons).

After Three Orphan Kittens, Disney offered Anderson a position in the layout department, headed by Charles Phillippi and Hugh Hennesy. One evening, in 1934, Anderson was first notified of Disney's plans for Snow White and the Seven Dwarfs (1937) when Disney acted out the entire story to his animation staff on a soundstage. Feeling motivated by Disney's performance, Disney assigned Anderson, alongside special effects animator Cy Young, lighting expert Hal Halvenston and engineer Bill Garity, to design moving backgrounds for an animation test of a peddler woman in the forest, meant to display actual depth and perspective. Using an experimental multiplane camera, Anderson drew three planes of animated trees, which were placed on large glass plates, and had the team experiment with distances. Disney was pleased with the results and ordered further animation tests of the dwarfs' cottage and Snow White.

"I'm impressed with what you've been doing, Ken ...You're new here, and I want you to understand one thing: there's one thing we're selling here and that's the name 'Walt Disney.' If you can buy that and be happy to work for it, you're my man. But if you've got any ideas of selling the name 'Ken Anderson,' it's best for you leave right now."

— Disney to Ken Anderson

For the sequence, Anderson built a full-size miniature of the dwarfs' cottage and its interior to assist the background and layout artists. Live-action reference footage was then filmed of dancer Marge Champion (performing as Snow White) wearing a "black heavy dress" against a white screen background. Disney was pleased with the footage, wanting the camera movement and staging translated directly onto animation cels. Anderson further contributed by creating layouts and conceptual sketches for the "Someday My Prince Will Come" dream sequence; however, it was ultimately cut during the storyboarding phase. He was also the inspiration behind the dwarf Dopey's wiggling ears. In the finished film, Anderson was credited as one of the art directors.

Anderson next worked on the short Ferdinand the Bull (1938). He had creative differences with background artist Mique Nelson over the art direction, in which Nelson favored traditional tinted watercolors against Anderson's preferred use of saturated opaque colors. Nelson left the production and complained to Disney about Anderson. For Pinocchio (1940), Anderson handled layout for several sequences, including the scene in which the Blue Fairy gives life to Pinocchio, Jiminy Cricket finding Pinocchio inside a cage, and Pinocchio becoming a real boy. Fantasia (1940) soon followed, in which Anderson was one of several art directors for The Pastoral Symphony sequence. For visual reference on the backgrounds, Anderson recalled, "I was inspired by Böcklin's Isle of the Dead and also by The Isola Bella in Italy. Walt said, 'Read up on Beethoven and get some style.' So I read up on the ribald and classical." Anderson subsequently served as an art director for the animated segment on The Reluctant Dragon (1941).

=== 1943–1949: Package films, Song of the South ===
By 1941, an animators' strike had lasted four months. While a federal mediator from the National Labor Relations Board negotiated with the two sides, Disney accepted an offer from Nelson Rockefeller, head of the Office of the Coordinator of Inter-American Affairs to make a goodwill trip to South America. Anderson was not invited as part of the trip, but he was asked to handle layouts for the "Pedro" segment for Saludos Amigos (1943). A year later, from October 9 to 23, 1942, Anderson was invited on a follow-up trip to Mexico for research on The Three Caballeros (1944). He worked closely with color stylist Mary Blair, in which he retained Blair's visual style while compositing the live-action footage and animation.

Anderson worked with animation director Wilfred Jackson on Song of the South (1946), in which they adapted Blair's styling sketches for more illusive backgrounds with a notable depth of field. During production, a new rear projection system was developed, in which the animation was done first and then the live-action sequences were composited. Before any live action was shot, Anderson had previsualized the segments through thumbnail sketches, which he gave the animators for their agreement. Filming began in Phoenix, Arizona in December 1944. Jackson remembered, "Ken helped set the camera angles and work out the staging of the thing, and Ken worked so hard with me on working out the details of how to fit the combination sequences, where the live action and cartoon work, together." However, much to Jackson's surprise, Disney was not satisfied because they did not replicate enough of Blair's style. Anderson later worked on the story development for Melody Time (1948) and So Dear to My Heart (1948).

=== 1950–1959: Cinderella, Disneyland, Sleeping Beauty ===
In 1947, Walt Disney decided to return to feature-length animated films, with Cinderella (1950) selected as the inaugural project. For the film, Anderson worked on the story adaptation, collaborating with Bill Peet. Anderson had stated Peet focused on the characters, while he concentrated on the production design. Anderson next did the color styling for Alice in Wonderland (1951).

On Sleeping Beauty (1959), Anderson served as the film's production designer. Kay Nielsen was the film's initial art director, in which he created "soft pastel" styling sketches. Anderson was impressed with Neilsen's artwork, though he felt that Nielsen's paintings would be difficult to translate into animation. Disney tasked John Hench to help interpret Nielsen's artwork with opaque cel paint, but Nielsen left the studio by 1953. Disney later hired Eyvind Earle as the new art director. Earle's conceptual paintings impressed the layout artists and animators, though they complained his style was too rigid and modernist. Anderson complained, "I had to fight myself to make myself draw that way."

In 1952, Disney founded the research and development company Walt Disney Inc. (WDI), known today as Walt Disney Imagineering. To design and build the Disneyland theme park, Disney selected several animation staff members, including Anderson, Hench, Bob Gurr, and Roger Broggie as his initial "Imagineers". Anderson collaborated with Claude Coats on the Fantasyland "dark rides", including Mr. Toad's Wild Ride, Peter Pan's Flight, and Snow White and Her Adventures. The process began with Anderson and Coats designing the sets and interiors, in which they eschewed the title character and placed the audience in their perspective, while Bill Martin designed the track layout.

By 1956, Anderson returned to work on Sleeping Beauty when the film's production resumed. He storyboarded the battle sequence between Prince Philip and Maleficent. To match with the action, he listened to Pyotr Ilyich Tchaikovsky's 1889 ballet The Sleeping Beauty.

=== 1960–1966: One Hundred and One Dalmatians, The Jungle Book, death of Walt Disney ===
The commercial failure of Sleeping Beauty (1959) initially discouraged Disney from producing more feature-length animated films, wherein the closure of the animation department was considered. Despite this, Disney assigned Anderson to work on One Hundred and One Dalmatians (1961). While designing the film's visual style, Anderson learned about a television production studio—Hurrell Productions—was using xerography to produce television ads featuring Disney characters. Inspired by the technique, Anderson experimented with a Xerox photocopier to directly transfer the animators' drawings onto transparent cels, thereby eliminating the inking process. Anderson screened an animation test to Disney and the animators; although Disney expressed concern at the graphic style, he gave his approval stating: "Ah, yeah, yeah, you can fool around all you want to." Furthermore, Anderson applied xerography with the background artwork to match the character animation, giving the film a unified visual style.

As early as 1956, Anderson had begun developing story sketches based on the Reynard the Fox legend. In 1960, Anderson and animator Marc Davis decided to adapt the medieval fable Chanticleer and the Fox into an animated film. Both men spent months developing elaborate storyboards and preliminary character artwork. They had presented their pitch before Disney and several studio executives, in which one voice said: "You can't make a personality out of a chicken." Further development was halted when during a meeting, on August 24, Disney remarked that the problem with making a rooster a protagonist was "[you] don't feel like picking a rooster up and petting it."

Released in 1961, One Hundred and One Dalmatians became a critical and commercial success, earning nearly $10 million during its initial domestic release. The animators had been pleased with the film's linear animation quality, but Walt Disney felt it lacked the delicacy and care of his earlier animated films. In a subsequent meeting with the animation staff concerning future films, Disney harshly criticized the Dalmatians art direction and further stated, "Ken's never going to be an art director again." Anderson was hurt by the criticism and further stated Disney did not speak to him for a year.

In 1962, Anderson suffered two strokes in one week, which partially paralyzed the right side of his body for nearly three years. He recovered with help from his wife Polly. As part of his recuperation, Anderson exercised and visited the Descanso Gardens, near his home at La Cañada Flintridge, California, for solace and comfort. Anderson resumed work as an art director on The Sword in the Stone (1963). However, Anderson was dissatisfied with the film's art direction, stating it "was a toothsome thing; it was an original backdrop painting, soft and foggy and a spotlight effect with characters on top of it, but at the same time it couldn't help but be affected by the looks of Dalmatians in most cases."

A year later, The Jungle Book (1967) went into production, in which Anderson provided additional concept art and backgrounds, along with character design ideas. During one story meeting, Disney assigned Anderson to design the villain Shere Khan. Anderson based his character designs on Basil Rathbone, envisioning Khan as "a very menacing, underplayed villain." The next day, Anderson showed his sketches to Disney, which reminded him of George Sanders (and cast him in the role). Animator Milt Kahl refined Anderson's conceptual sketches and watched Jungle Cat (1960) and A Tiger Walks (1964) for reference. Meanwhile, Anderson contributed visual development on the featurette Winnie the Pooh and the Honey Tree (1966).

With The Jungle Book scheduled for 1967, Disney assigned Anderson to determine whether The Aristocats (1970) would be suitable for an animated feature. Following several months, Disney glanced at Anderson's conceptual sketches and approved the project as the studio's next animated film. Before Disney's death in December 1966, Anderson remembered his last meeting:

In fact, I was outdoors of the building and there was Walt. He had shrunk down ... I was so glad to see him. I knew that whatever he appeared to be was because of his illness, and I grabbed him by the hand and said, 'Gee, it's sure good to see you again, Walt. Happy to have you back.' And Walt looked at me. He was kind of quiet and he said, 'It's sure good to be back, Ken.' And then I knew that he was forgiving me for 101 Dalmatians. I don't knew how I knew it, but I did.

=== 1967–1978: The Aristocats, Robin Hood, Pete's Dragon ===
Following Disney's death, Anderson continued as art director on The Aristocats. He simplified the plot to focus more on the cats, including paring down the number of characters. By April 1967, the studio had arrived at a working story outline. As production continued, in October 1968, Anderson accompanied then-Disney president Card Walker on a fishing trip who suggested a classic tale should be the subject for the next animated film. Anderson proposed the Robin Hood legend, to which Walker responded positively. Anderson mentioned the idea during an Aristocats story meeting, and was quickly assigned to create character designs. As done previously on The Jungle Book (1967), Milt Kahl refined Anderson's concepts for the character animation. However, Anderson became upset when the final results of his character concepts became animal stereotypes.

At the same time, in 1973, Anderson began developing a film adaptation of the Catfish Bend book series by Ben Lucien Burman. He also developed an adaptation of the children's book Scruffy by Paul Gallico. The story centered around the titular Barbary ape, who is the honorable leader of a family of apes. Set during World War II, off the coast of Gibraltar, Scruffy falls in love with Amelia, a pampered pet ape, and together they evade capture from the Nazis. By 1976, the project had been shelved.

During production of The Rescuers (1977), Anderson again drew character concepts, including repurposing Cruella de Vil from One Hundred and One Dalmatians (1961) as the main villain. However, the idea was discarded and Cruella was replaced by a similar villain, Madame Medusa. In 1976, Anderson was ready for retirement until he was approached by Ron Miller to work on Pete's Dragon (1977). Anderson agreed, and was tasked to create character designs for Elliott, an animated dragon character that interacted with the human characters. For Elliott, Anderson took visual inspiration from the Chinese dragon and actor Wallace Beery. His drawings impressed Miller and co-producer Jerome Courtland. Miller convinced Anderson to remain on the project to help the younger animators on the character. On March 31, 1978, Anderson retired from Walt Disney Productions.

=== 1979–1993: Walt Disney Imagineering, later works ===
In 1979, Anderson was hired by Walt Disney Imagineering to help renovate Fantasyland, with the project being dubbed "New Fantasyland". As part of the expansion project, the park added a new "dark ride" attraction called Pinocchio's Daring Journey. On May 25, 1983, the new Fantasyland was opened to the public. A year later, his career was profiled for the Disney Family Album television program, which aired on November 5, 1984. In 1985, Anderson's contract with WED Enterprises was renewed, in which he later consulted on the proposed Equatorial Africa Pavilion for the EPCOT Center.

During the 1980s, Anderson returned to animation, in which he submitted conceptual artwork for several animated series including Dumbo's Circus, Adventures of the Gummi Bears, and The Wuzzles. He also traveled to Japan to draw storyboards for Little Nemo: Adventures in Slumberland (1989). He had been awarded a Winsor McCay Award in 1982. In 1991, Anderson was inducted as a Disney Legend. A year before his death, he published a children's book, Nessie and the Little Blind Boy of Loch Ness.

== Personal life and death ==
Anderson met Polly at the University of Washington, and they were married during the summer of 1934. They had three daughters named Sue, Judy and Wendy.

On December 13, 1993, Anderson died in La Cañada Flintridge, California from complications of a stroke, at the age of 84.

== Filmography ==
Year	Title	Credits	Refs
1937	Snow White and the Seven Dwarfs	Art Director	
1940	Pinocchio	Art Director	
1940	Fantasia	Art Director - Segment "The Pastoral Symphony"	
1941	The Reluctant Dragon	Art Director: Cartoon Sequences / Himself (in a drawing class)	
1944	The Three Caballeros	Art Supervisor	
1946	Song of the South	Cartoon Art Director	
1948	Melody Time	Story	
1948	So Dear to My Heart	Cartoon Story Treatment	
1950	Cinderella	Story	
1951	Alice in Wonderland	Color and Styling	
1953	Peter Pan	Layout Artist	
1953	Ben and Me (Short)	Art Director	
1955	Davy Crockett, King of the Wild Frontier	Art Department	
1955	Lady and the Tramp	Layout Artist	
1959	Sleeping Beauty	Production Designer	
1961	One Hundred and One Dalmatians	Art Director / Production Designer	
1963	The Sword in the Stone	Art Director	
1966	Winnie the Pooh and the Honey Tree (Short)	Story	
1967	The Jungle Book	Story	
1970	The Aristocats	Story / Production Designer	
1973	Robin Hood	Based on Character and Story Conceptions by / Story Sequences	
1977	The Many Adventures of Winnie the Pooh	Story	
1977	The Rescuers	Story	
1977	Pete's Dragon	Creator: "Elliott" / Animation Art Director	
1989	Little Nemo: Adventures in Slumberland	Story Sketches	

== Bibliography ==
- Allan, Robin (1999). Walt Disney and Europe: European Influence on the Animated Feature Films of Walt Disney. John Libbey & Co. ISBN 978-1-8646-2041-2.
- Anderson, Paul F. (2017). Jack of All Trades: Conversations with Disney Legend Ken Anderson. Theme Park Press. ISBN 978-1-683-90053-5.
- Barrier, Michael (1999). Hollywood Cartoons: American Animation in Its Golden Age. Oxford University Press. ISBN 978-0-1980-2079-0.
- Barrier, Michael (2007). The Animated Man: A Life of Walt Disney. University of California Press. ISBN 978-0-5202-5619-4.
- Canemaker, John (1996). "Ken Anderson". Before the Animation Begins: The Art and Lives of Disney Inspirational Sketch Artists. Hyperion Books. pp. 169–182. ISBN 978-0-786-86152-1.
- Deja, Andreas (2015). The Nine Old Men: Lessons, Techniques, and Inspiration from Disney's Great Animators. Routledge. ISBN 978-1-1350-1586-2.
- Deja, Andreas (2022). Walt Disney's The Jungle Book: Making a Masterpiece. Weldon Owen. ISBN 978-1-6818-8893-4.
- Gabler, Neal (2006). Walt Disney: The Triumph of the American Imagination. Vintage Books. ISBN 978-0-6797-5747-4.
- Ghez, Didier (2019). "Ken Anderson". They Drew as They Pleased Vol. 5: The Hidden Art of Disney's Early Renaissance. Chronicle Books. pp. 23–54. ISBN 978-1-797-20410-9.
- Holliss, Richard; Sibley, Brian (1994). Snow White and the Seven Dwarfs & the Making of the Classic Film. Hyperion. ISBN 978-0-7868-6133-0.
- Iwerks, Leslie (2022). The Imagineering Story: The Official Biography of Walt Disney Imagineering. Disney Editions. ISBN 978-1-368-04936-8.
- Peri, Don (2008). "Ken Anderson". Working with Walt: Interviews with Disney Artists. University Press of Mississippi. pp. 134–148. ISBN 978-1-604-73023-4.
- Solomon, Charles (1995). The Disney That Never Was: The Stories and Art of Five Decades of Unproduced Animation. Hyperion. ISBN 978-0-786-86037-1.
- Thomas, Bob (1994) [1976]. Walt Disney: An American Original. New York: Hyperion. ISBN 978-0-7857-5515-9.
- Thomas, Bob (1958). Walt Disney, the Art of Animation. Simon & Schuster.
- Thomas, Frank; Johnston, Ollie (1981). The Illusion of Life: Disney Animation. New York: Hyperion. ISBN 0-7868-6070-7.
- Williams, Pat; Denney, James (2004). How to Be Like Walt: Capturing the Disney Magic Every Day of Your Life. Health Communications Inc. ISBN 978-0-7573-0231-2.
