= Mr. Toad's Wild Ride =

Dark ride at Disneyland

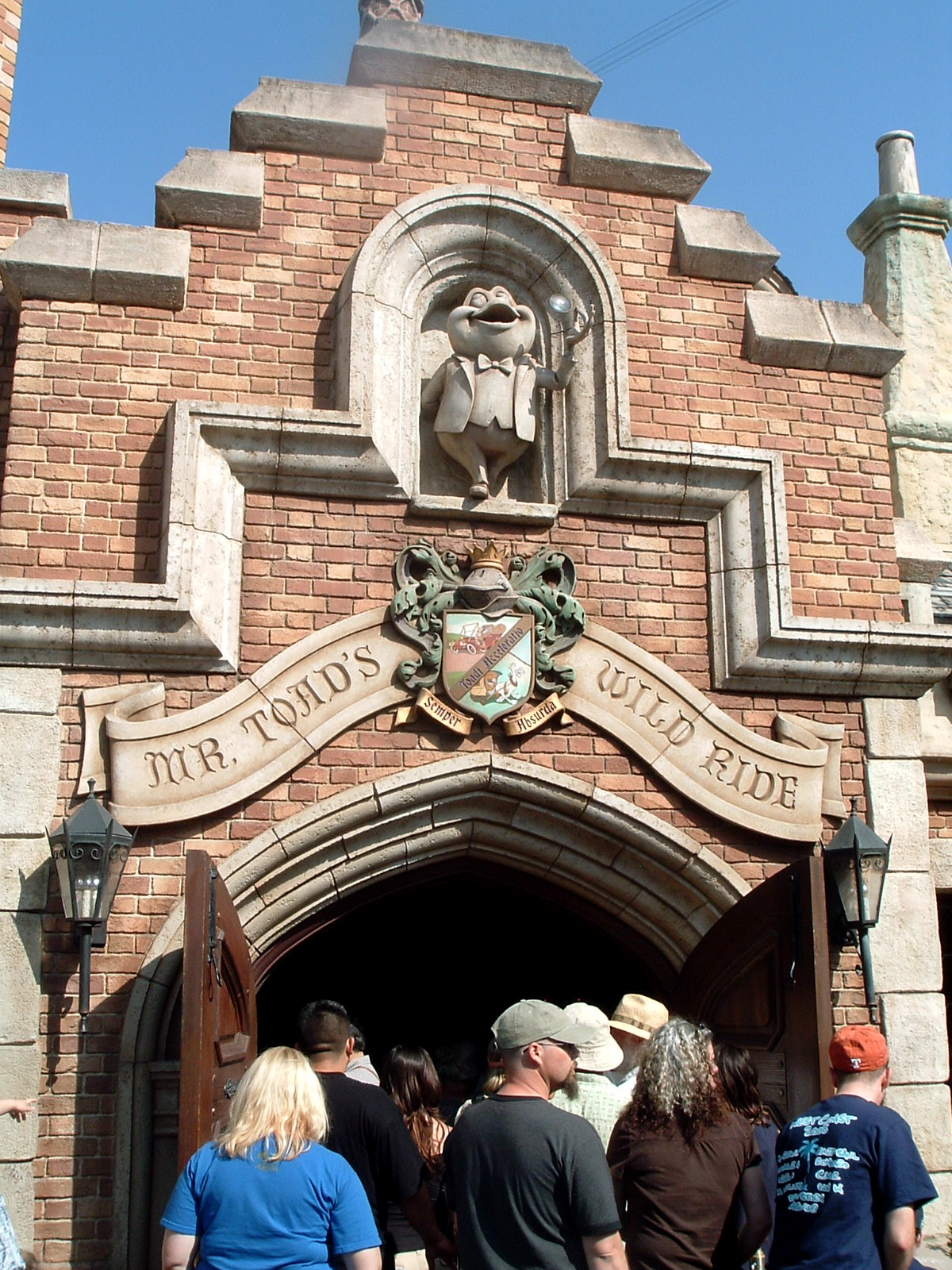

Disneyland
- Area: Fantasyland
- Coordinates: 33.8133°N 117.9187°W
- Status: Operating
- Opening date: July 17, 1955

Magic Kingdom
- Area: Fantasyland
- Coordinates: 28.4199°N 81.5802°W
- Status: Closed
- Opening date: October 1, 1971
- Closing date: September 7, 1998
- Replaced by: The Many Adventures of Winnie the Pooh

Ride statistics
- Designer: WED Enterprises
- Theme: The Adventures of Ichabod and Mr. Toad
- Vehicles: 16
- Riders per vehicle: 2
- Must transfer from wheelchair

Mr. Toad's Wild Ride is a dark ride at Disneyland Park in Anaheim, California. It is loosely based on Disney's adaptation of Kenneth Grahame's The Wind in the Willows (1908), one of two segments comprising the animated package film The Adventures of Ichabod and Mr. Toad (1949). The ride is one of the few remaining attractions operational since the park's opening in July 1955, although the current iteration of the ride opened in 1983. Mr. Toad's Wild Ride is located in Fantasyland; a variation of the attraction also existed as an opening day attraction at Magic Kingdom at Walt Disney World from 1971 until 1998.

In all versions of the attraction, guests have assumed the role of the titular Mr. Toad, recklessly careening through the English countryside and streets of London in a period motorcar before ultimately meeting demise in a railway tunnel and ending up in a tongue-in-cheek depiction of hell. The attraction, unlike other Fantasyland dark rides, is not a direct retelling of the film that it was based on. Its ending in particular is an original scene that has no basis in either the 1949 film or the original novel by Kenneth Grahame. Originally envisioned as a roller coaster, Mr. Toad's Wild Ride was realized as a dark ride because Walt Disney felt as though a roller coaster might not have been appropriate for young children and the elderly.

== Voice Cast ==
- Corey Burton - Everyone Else
- Candy Candido - Devils / Dragon

== 1955 version (Disneyland) ==
The very first iteration of Mr. Toad's Wild Ride was the least complex out of all three. Designed by Imagineers Bill Martin, Ken Anderson, Claude Coats, and Robert A. Mattey, the version of the attraction that opened to the public along with the rest of Disneyland in July 1955 contained the simplest gags, the fewest setpieces and characters, and, with a duration of 98 seconds, was the shortest in length.

One quality of Mr. Toad's Wild Ride that was especially prevalent during its earliest years is the liberal use of painted plywood "flats" in its interior sets. Whereas its contemporary opening-day Fantasyland dark rides Snow White's Enchanted Wish and Peter Pan's Flight employed three-dimensional figures and sculpts for either the majority or at least a significant quantity of their interior scenery and characters, the various scenes of Mr. Toad's Wild Ride were rendered predominantly by means of two-dimensional flats, with only a scarce presence of three-dimensional sculpts. More three-dimensional gags and scene details were added in later updates, although the attraction has always remained "flat" in its presentation, despite the other Fantasyland dark rides having become considerably less so over the decades.

As with the 1955 incarnations of the Snow White and Peter Pan dark rides, the exterior façade of Mr. Toad's Wild Ride was fashioned to resemble a colorful medieval tournament tent, and its loading queue was located within a large opening in the front wall of the show building. Embellishing the boarding area was a huge, elaborately painted mural spanning the entire front wall of the space housing the interior scenes; this mural depicted both the cast of the film on which the ride was based as well as the scenarios encountered within the attraction.

Guests waiting in line were treated to the confusing lyrics of The Merrily Song, and the enthusiastic voice of Mr. Toad himself (provided by Eric Blore, his voice actor from the film) beckoned all to come along with him on his travels: "Come along! Hop on up here! We'll go for a jolly ride! Buford Road! The dusty highway! Come! I'll show you the world! Travel! Change! Excitement!" Upon boarding a fiberglass replica of a 1900s-era one-seat roadster (manufactured by Arrow Development), guests "crashed" through the front doors of Toad Hall (the extravagant Tudor-style estate of Mr. Toad) at the far-left end of the mural. Once in the confines of the lavishly detailed mansion, guests approached a large stained-glass bay window before their car performed a sudden U-turn and headed instead toward a forced-perspective mural of an open living parlor. Here, two miniature "toad-shaped" suits of armor supported by pedestals (one on either side of the mural) swung down their halberds as guests drew near, causing the vehicle to swerve into the opposite direction. Guests then rolled under a pointed arch and into a smaller room where a third miniature suit of armor brought down its mace. The motorcar then veered to the left and crashed through the paneled wall, and guests found themselves in total darkness.

Swerving through the night, guests encountered a large mirror reflecting their vehicle's headlights, providing the illusion of an oncoming automobile as the screech of a motorcar's brakes was heard. Guests then swung out of the way before passing under a natural archway and advancing toward a mural depicting the rustic cottage of Ratty the water rat along the moonlit riverbank, as well as a fully sculpted boat docked in front. Swinging around another bend, guests approached a three-dimensional roadway leading off into a mural of a twisted intersection at the center of a rural hamlet, while signs labeled with nonsensical place names such as "Woostershire" and "Not So Shire" made for a sense of confusion. Guests then swerved into a narrow village street, where a plethora of road signs fixed to the buildings and lampposts read, "TURN BACK," "DO NOT ENTER," "ONE WAY," and other such warnings. Despite these, guests had no choice but to continue down the long straightaway, eventually reaching the headlights of an oncoming vehicle in the darkness beyond the thoroughfare and swerving out of the way to avoid it.

As a police officer blew his whistle and a loud siren blared, the car performed a U-turn and began down a dilapidated wooden pier flanked to the right with old bollards and a large ocean freighter. As guests advanced over a series of bumps emulating the rough surface of unsafe boards, a mural depicting London across from the harbor under a foggy night sky was seen beyond the edge of the wharf. Just before guests approached the end of the pier, their vehicle swung around and rammed through the doors of a dockside warehouse, now racing between long, towering rows of crates and kegs stocked with dynamite, blasting powder, and other dangerous contents. At the end of the corridor was a forced-perspective mural featuring an exit door marked with a sign reading, "THIS WAY OUT," next to which was a tall stack of barrels and a crate. As guests approached the false exit, the tower of barrels toppled down, blocking the way out and forcing the motorcar to instead turn toward a solid brick wall before smashing straight through it.

Guests now found themselves back in the English countryside, swerving swiftly around stunted trees (some of them anthropomorphic, with startled faces and branch arms lunged away in shock) and darting briefly toward police officers blowing their whistles and a mural of a dirt roadway leading off into the distance. After swinging past a signal box and a ringing crossbuck, guests briefly drew near a mural of a precarious, winding road scaling the side of a cliff before racing by a sleepy railroad engineer and breaking through a crossing gate. As the steam whistle of a nearby locomotive was heard, guests were swept under the arched stone maw of "R.R. Tunnel No. 13." Inside the pitch-black tunnel, riders proceeded over a series of simulated railroad ties, heard the roar of an oncoming engine, saw the front headlight of the approaching locomotive appear straight ahead in the darkness, and finally "collided" directly into the train amid a loud crash. The darkness then gave way to a menacing, demonic face with a gaping mouth: the jaws of hell. As guests passed under the demon's sharp teeth, the word "WELCOME" written in flames greeted them into the depths of the underworld, where they swerved around red-hot stalagmites topped with miniature horned devils who laughed maniacally and wielded pitchforks. Guests were soon directed toward the ride's final set of doors, which took them back out into the queue area.

In 1961, Mr. Toad's Wild Ride received an assortment of new gags, scene details, and technical improvements. Among these were additional character flats (Moley, MacBadger, and a human butler in Toad Hall, as well as Ratty in front of one of the painted storefronts in the village scene and a handful of new police officers, including one on a motorcycle), new crash doors (these being a construction barricade located in the village street and multiple breakaway flats of stacked crates and kegs in the warehouse), improved crash doors in general, and fully-sculpted devils and red "rock" in the hell scene replacing the original flats.

== 1983 version (Disneyland) ==
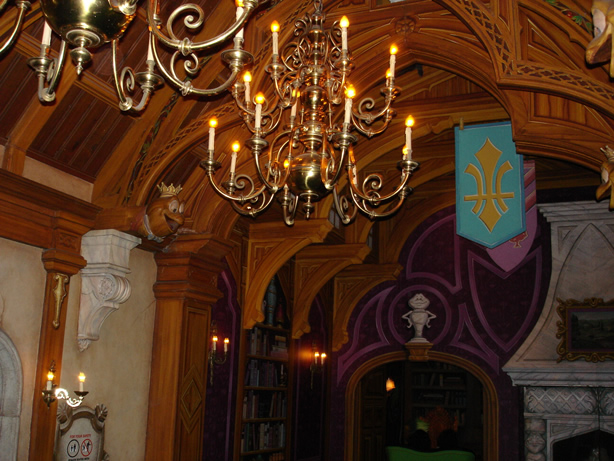
The interior of Toad Hall, seen from the queue shortly before boarding.

Guests enter a re-creation of Toad Hall, passing by artistic works commemorating characters from the film. A large mural shows the adventures of Toad and his motorcar, foreshadowing various scenes in the ride. This mural has a hidden reference to Walt Disney and his love for trains in the form of a train named "W.E.D. Rail". Guests hop aboard miniature, early 1900s (decade)-era, multicolored motorcars. The name of one of the characters from the film (Mr. Toad, Toady, Ratty, Moley, MacBadger, Cyril, Winky, or Weasel) is inscribed on each motorcar. Disembodied voices sing The Merrily Song, but it is more like the version in the film.

Passengers begin their journey by crashing into a library, where MacBadger is seen teetering atop a ladder with a stack of books. They then crash through the fireplace, where fiberoptic effects simulate the scattering of embers on the floor. Narrowly avoiding a falling suit of armor, the passengers break through a set of doors to find the interior hallway of Toad Hall in disarray, as weasels swing from chandeliers. Guests then enter the dining room, where Mole is having a meal at a dinner table and gets knocked aside.

Upon leaving Toad Hall, guests travel through the countryside, passing Ratty's house, being chased by policemen, barely avoiding colliding with traffic (which is actually their reflection in a mirror), and cracking a bridge with a farmer's animals on it. Making a right turn, guests head for the docks and get the impression that their car will plunge into the river, but quickly make a sharp turn in a different direction and enter a warehouse full of barrels and crates containing explosives with the word DANGER marked on all of them. Guests crash through a brick wall as the warehouse's contents explode in a burst of bright, flashing lights. They then head out into the streets of London, narrowly avoid a collision with a delivery truck, and enter Winky's Pub, where Mr. Winky the bartender holds two beer mugs. He ducks down, leaving the mugs spinning in midair (this gag is recycled from the Florida version of the ride).

Passengers then enter the town square, where the cars wreak further havoc on the citizens with some of them standing on top of buildings. A statue of Toad and Cyril Proudbottom stands in the center of the town. Behind this statue is one of Lady Justice peeking out from under her blindfold. Next, guests enter a jury-less courtroom in a building marked LAW COURT, where the riders are proclaimed guilty by a judge (based on the film's prosecutor for the Crown). The cars then enter what is presumed to be a dark prison cell before abruptly turning right and landing on railroad tracks. The vehicles bounce along the tracks in the dark before colliding head-on with an oncoming train.

Passengers then arrive at the ride's final scene: hell. The entire room is heated (except in hot weather), and the scenery features small devils who bounce up and down. Passengers also see a demon who resembles the judge from the courtroom scene. Near the end of the scene, a towering green fire-breathing dragon emerges and attempts to burn the riders to a crisp. A glowing light is seen in the back of its throat and it coughs while the motorcar speeds away. The passengers then go back to the ride's loading and unloading area, where they disembark.

Some small changes were made to this version of the attraction. The fireplace effect used to be a projection on smoke, but it got changed to a crash door due to the smoke's timing often making it invisible.

The installation at Disneyland was manufactured by Arrow Development.

== Magic Kingdom version ==
Mr. Toad's Wild Ride was one of the Magic Kingdom's opening day attractions on October 1, 1971. The biggest difference from the Disneyland version was that it had two separate boarding areas. The vehicles (in the form of jalopies) in each boarding area were on separate tracks that followed different paths, so riders would get a slightly different ride depending on where they boarded. It contained highly ornate plywood characters and sets that were very reminiscent of the multiplane camerawork featured in many Disney films.

In October 1997, rumors began to spread that an attraction based on Winnie-the-Pooh would replace Mr. Toad's Wild Ride. On August 27, 1998, Walt Disney World officially announced the closure of Mr. Toad's Wild Ride. The attraction closed on September 7, 1998, to make room for The Many Adventures of Winnie the Pooh which opened on June 4, 1999. Tributes to Mr. Toad's Wild Ride can be found in the attraction, including paintings of Mr. Toad and Moley. In addition, there is a statue of Mr. Toad in the pet cemetery outside of The Haunted Mansion in Liberty Square.

=== Right Track ===
On the Right Track, guests first passed through the library (similar to the Disneyland version) then broke out of Toad Hall and passed through a barnyard, coming face to face with a sheep, a pig and a couple of cows along the way. After encountering a bull, and crashing into a barn to be attacked by chickens, guests pass through a small tunnel with several warning signs, known as the One Way Street, guests made a turn into a central plaza. Traveling around the turn, the vehicles passed a policeman signaling riders to stop with his whistle. Guests then made a right hand turn into the courtroom and saw the judge (who in this version was actually a policeman holding a gavel). Upon making another right hand turn, the vehicles passed by several policemen and weasel convicts and then entered a prison cell, where some weasels were trying to break out.

After winding through the cells, guests emerged out into Shireland, passing by a shootout between the police and some weasels (using red lights to simulate gunfire). Several of the police barriers then moved aside revealing a railroad crossing, complete with a ringing bell. The gate then moved aside (presumably breaking apart), and the vehicles made a right hand turn onto the tracks. The vehicles traveled along the railroad tracks until getting hit by a train (with guests seeing the headlight of the locomotive). A door then opened, revealing the hell scene, in which there were volcanos, flashing lights, multiple laughing demons, and a giant flat of Satan that popped up (similarly to the dandelion in Alice in Wonderland at Disneyland). Afterwards, guests went through a door back to the boarding area.

=== Left Track ===
From the boarding area to the plaza, the Left Track passed through three scenes not seen in the Right Track: Toad's trophy room, a kitchen, and a Gypsy camp. After going through the One Way Street and rounding the plaza, instead of entering the courtroom, guests continued on and entered Winky's Tavern. Mr Winky the bartender, who was holding two beer mugs, could then be seen ducking down, leaving the mugs spinning in the air (this gag was recycled for the revamped 1983 California version of the ride). The vehicles then made a right hand turn and guests could see the weasels hiding out in the tavern among the ale barrels. Following this, guests emerged into the night countryside. Passing by Ratty's house (where Ratty appeared only once and Moley was seen on a boat), the vehicles reached a railroad crossing. This gate moved aside, and vehicles made a left hand turn onto the railroad tracks. As on the Right Track, the headlight of the locomotive was visible before the train hit the guests. The hell scene on this track was merely a mirror image of the Right Track's hell sequence.

== See also ==
- Peter Pan's Flight
- Snow White's Enchanted Wish
