= Ginny Tyler =

American voice actress (1925–2012)

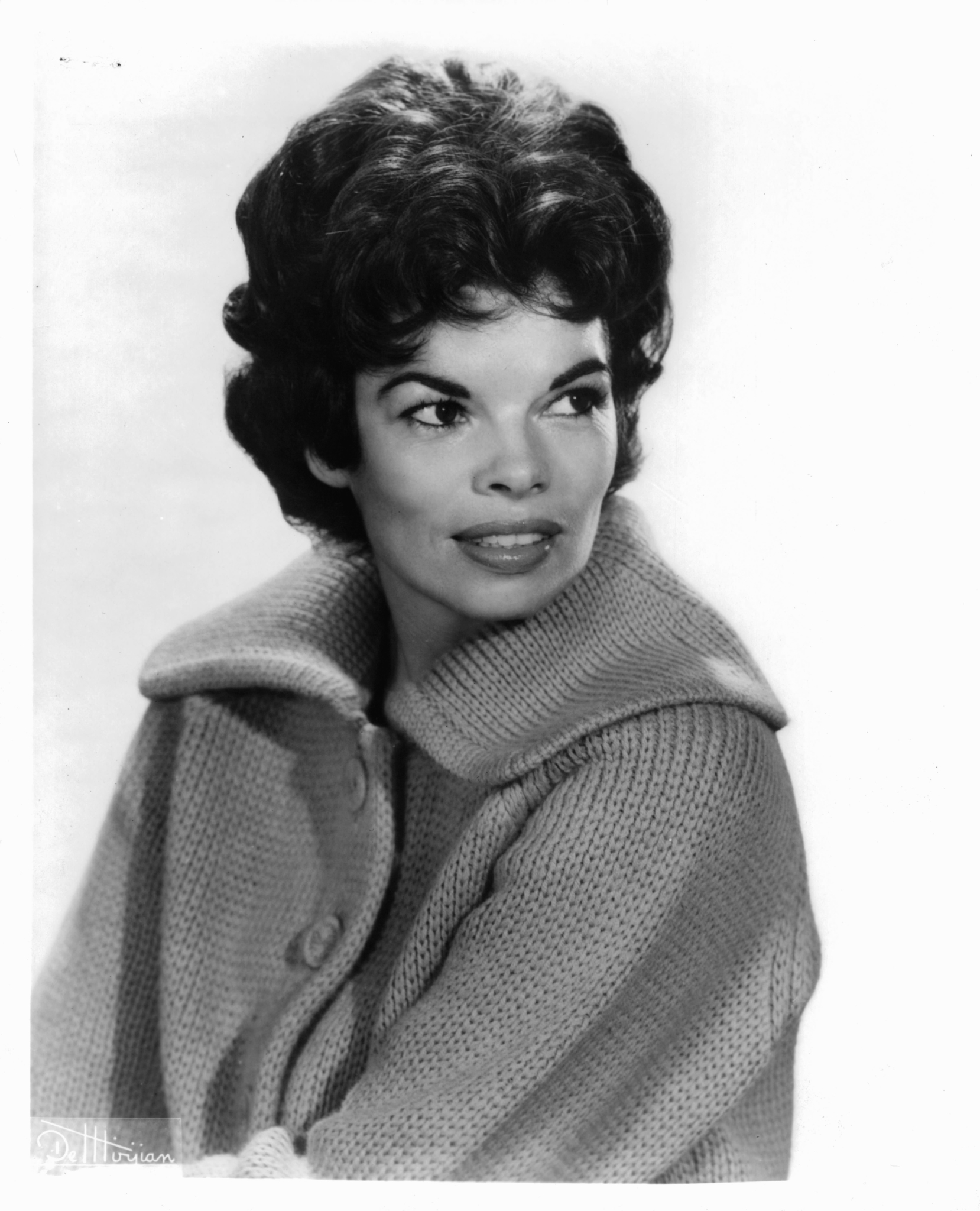
- Tyler in 1964
- Born: Merrie Virginia Erlandson; August 8, 1925; Berkeley, California, U.S.
- Died: July 13, 2012 (aged 86); Issaquah, Washington, U.S.
- Other name: Merrie Virginia Eggers
- Education: University of Washington
- Occupations: Voice actress, singer
- Years active: 1937–1993
- Spouses: Lowell Studley Fenton (m. 1946, divorced); Albert W. Jacobsen (m. 1980; died 1995)
- Children: 1

Merrie Virginia Eggers (née Erlandson; August 8, 1925 – July 13, 2012), known professionally as Ginny Tyler, was an American voice actress who performed on dozens of cartoons and animated films from 1957 to 1993. In 2006, she was named a Disney Legend.

== Early life ==
Tyler was born the elder of two children of Erland Alfred and Harriet (née Ruttenberg) Erlandson in 1925 in Berkeley, California, United States. The family moved to Seattle, Washington, where her brother Donald was born. Later her parents were divorced and her mother remarried and Ginny's step-father adopted Ginny and she became Merrie Virginia Eggers.

== Career ==
Tyler grew up in Seattle and her family had a rich legacy of storytelling and imitation of animal sounds, which proved very useful to her later on in her career as an artist. She first appeared before a radio microphone sometime in the 1930s and co-hosted, alongside Al Priddy the radio show Make Believe Island on KOL station. The show was moved to television, on KOMO-TV and renamed Magic Island by the early 1950s.

Tyler began to work more and more offscreen as a voice artist, appearing in several cartoons and narrating vinyl recordings of Disney films like Bambi and Babes in Toyland. She provided the voice of an amorous squirrel who falls in love with the young King Arthur (while he is in the form of a male squirrel) in The Sword in the Stone. She sang the voices of several barnyard animals in the "Jolly Holiday" sequence of Mary Poppins.

From 1960 to 1962, she also performed several voices for the series Davey and Goliath, including Davey's mother and his sister Sally. She was replaced by Nancy Wible, who had a similar voice (from both of their works in other series), but would use a louder tone than Ginny. The two played roles of carhops on The Flintstones episode "The Drive Inn" (made around the same time as the first episodes of Davey & Goliath) in 1960. Since 1963, inside Disneyland, she can be heard voicing Pele and Tangaroa-Ru during the outside pre-show for Walt's Disney's Enchanted Tiki Room. In 1964, Tyler appeared as the Genie in several performances of Aladdin and His Genie for the Pasadena Playhouse. In 1968, she was Flirtacia on Hanna-Barbera's The Adventures of Gulliver. She also played Jan on Space Ghost and Sue Richards, the Invisible Woman in the 1978 television series Fantastic Four. Although Tyler later retired and moved back to Seattle, she still did some recording for local productions. Tyler also voiced the Evil Queen in Snow White's Enchanted Wish.

== Death ==
She died on July 13, 2012, aged 86 at a Washington nursing home.

== Filmography ==
=== Film ===
- The Christmas Visit (1959) - Kolya (voice)
- West of the Pesos (1960) - Carmella (voice, uncredited)
- The Mouse on 57th Street (1960) - Customer (voice, uncredited)
- Daffy's Inn Trouble (1961) - Girl Singer on Record (voice, uncredited)
- Son of Flubber (1963) - Baby Walter (voice, uncredited)
- The Sword in the Stone (1963) - Little Girl Squirrel (voice)
- Mary Poppins (1964) - Lambs (voice, uncredited)
- Winnie the Pooh and the Honey Tree (1966, Short) - Bees (voice, uncredited)
- Doctor Dolittle (1967) - Polynesia (voice, uncredited)
- The Many Adventures of Winnie the Pooh (1977) - Bees (voice, uncredited)
- The Adventures of the Polar Cubs (1993, English dub of 1979 anime)

=== Audio recordings ===
- Spike Jones' I'm Popeye the Sailor Man (as Olive Oyl)
- Bambi (1960)
- Babes in Toyland
- Lady and the Tramp (1962)
- Hans Brinker
- More Mother Goose (1962)
- More Jungle Book (1968)
- The Superscope Storyteller (1973/1975)
- Trick or Treat (1974)

=== Television ===
- The Gumby Show (1956–1969) - Gumby, Gumba, Granny, Witty Witch, Additional voices
- The Huckleberry Hound Show (1959) - Mother (1 episode)
- The Loretta Young Show (1960) - Juck (1 episode)
- The Flintstones (1960–1962) - Daisy (voice) (2 episodes), Carhop (voice)
- Davey and Goliath (1961) - Various Female Characters (13 episodes)
- The Jack Benny Program (1961) - Parrot (voice) (1 episode)
- The Lucy Show (1962–1964) - The cockatiel / Sheep (voice)
- The New Casper Cartoon Show (1963) - Casper, Wendy & Various Other Characters (voice, uncredited) (8 episodes)
- Mister Ed (1963–1966) - Parrot / Tootsie / Claudia (voice)
- Space Ghost and Dino Boy (1966–1967) - Jan / Black Widow (voice)
- Fantastic Four (1967) - Princess Anelle (voice) (1 episode)
- The Adventures of Gulliver (1968–1969) - Flirtacia (voice)
- Cattanooga Cats (1969–1971) - additional voices
- Here's Lucy (1971) - Parrot (1 episode)
- ABC Afterschool Specials (1972) - Bird Calls (voice)
- Jeannie (1973) - (voice)
- Devlin (1974) - Aunt Martha / Polly (voice) (16 episodes)
- The Oddball Couple (1975) - additional voices (1 episode)
- The Jeffersons (1976) - Police Dispatcher (1 episode)
- Sesame Street (1976) - M in Space Cartoon
- Fred Flintstone and Friends (1977) - (voice) (16 episodes)
- The New Fantastic Four (1978) - Sue Richards / The Invisible Girl (voice) (13 episodes)
- Casper the Friendly Ghost: He Ain't Scary, He's Our Brother (1979, TV Movie) - Lovella / Dowager / Rural Lady (voice)
- Scooby-Doo and Scrappy-Doo (1979) - Tessie (voice) (1 episode)
- The Plastic Man Comedy/Adventure Show (1979–1980) - additional voices (16 episodes)
- Space Stars (1981) - additional voices (66 episodes)
- Wildfire (1986) - additional voices (1 episode)
- Brer Rabbit's Tales (1991) - (voice)
- Brer Rabbit's Christmas Carol (1992, TV Movie) - Miz Possum (voice) (final film role)

=== Theme park attractions ===
- Walt Disney's Enchanted Tiki Room (1963) - Pele / Tangaroa-Ru
- Snow White's Enchanted Wish (2021) - Evil Queen (archive recording)
