= Snow White's Enchanted Wish =

Dark ride at Disney theme parks

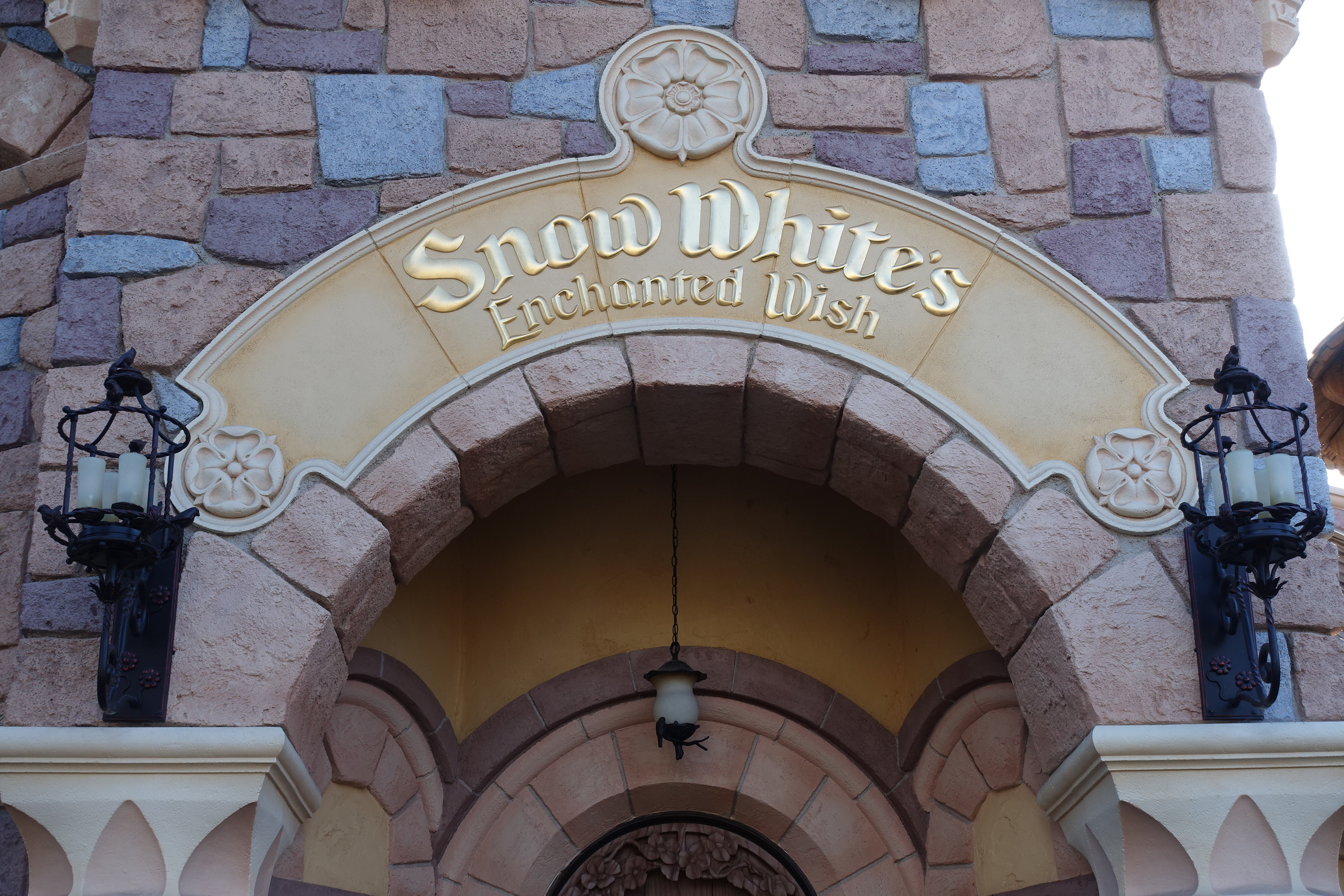

Disneyland
- Name: Snow White and Her Adventures (1955–1982); Snow White's Scary Adventures (1983–2020)
- Area: Fantasyland
- Coordinates: 33.8131°N 117.9192°W
- Status: Operating
- Opening date: July 17, 1955

Magic Kingdom
- Name: Snow White's Adventures (1971–1994); Snow White's Scary Adventures (1994–2012)
- Area: Fantasyland
- Coordinates: 28.41984°N 81.58096°W
- Status: Closed
- Opening date: October 1, 1971
- Closing date: May 31, 2012
- Replaced by: Princess Fairytale Hall

Tokyo Disneyland
- Name: Snow White's Adventures
- Area: Fantasyland
- Coordinates: 35.6318°N 139.8814°E
- Status: Operating
- Opening date: April 15, 1983

Disneyland Park (Paris)
- Name: Blanche Neige et les Sept Nains
- Area: Fantasyland
- Coordinates: 48.8733°N 2.7754°E
- Status: Operating
- Opening date: April 12, 1992

Ride statistics
- Attraction type: Dark ride
- Designer: WED Enterprises
- Theme: Snow White and the Seven Dwarfs
- Riders per vehicle: 4–6
- Rows: 2
- Must transfer from wheelchair

Snow White's Enchanted Wish is a classic dark ride attraction at Disneyland, Tokyo Disneyland, Disneyland Park (Paris) and formerly at the Magic Kingdom. Located in Fantasyland, it is one of the few remaining attractions that was operational on Disneyland's opening day in 1955, although it has seen several different redesigns over its history. The ride's story is based on Disney's 1937 film, Snow White and the Seven Dwarfs, their first animated feature film and features the voices of Ginny Tyler as the Evil Queen and Jimmy MacDonald as Doc.

The Disneyland version was originally known as Snow White and Her Adventures before its 1983 redesign, when it was renamed Snow White's Scary Adventures. It was rethemed again in 2021 with its current name.

The Tokyo Disneyland version is named Snow White's Adventures, which was also the original name of the now-closed Magic Kingdom version. The Disneyland Paris version is called Blanche Neige et les Sept Nains: L'Attraction (Snow White and the Seven Dwarfs: The Attraction).

== Voice Cast ==
- Ginny Tyler - Evil Queen
- Jimmy MacDonald - Doc

== Attraction summary ==
=== Disneyland ===
Snow White's Enchanted Wish opened on Disneyland's opening day as Snow White and Her Adventures. Imagineers designed the ride so that guests assumed the viewpoint of the main character, Snow White. Few people understood this concept, and some wondered why Snow White was not featured in the ride.

During the 1983 season, all of the Fantasyland dark rides were completely redesigned as part of a large overhaul of the area. This attraction, then renamed Snow White's Scary Adventures, and the other dark rides were modified to include the main characters of the films they represented. Snow White appeared once in the attraction. The outdoor facade was made to resemble the Evil Queen's castle from the movie.

When the Witch offered guests the poisoned apple in one scene, guests frequently tried (and sometimes managed) to steal the apple and bring it home as a souvenir. When Fantasyland was reopened in 1983, they solved the issue by replacing it with an image of an apple projected by means of a parabolic mirror.

On January 7, 2020, the attraction at Disneyland closed for an extended refurbishment. Walt Disney Imagineering installed new scenes and updated the attraction's audio and visual technology. Its exterior was also refreshed to complement the nearby Sleeping Beauty Castle. On December 21, 2020, the film's 83rd anniversary, Disney announced that the ride would be renamed Snow White's Enchanted Wish, and would include state-of-the-art audio and visual technology, including new music, LED black lighting, laser projections, and a new animation system. Other new elements include a dancing Snow White, the scent of pies baking, a new queue with storybooks, and the evil Queen's collection of spell books and bubbling potions. The ride officially reopened to the public on April 30, 2021, the same day Disneyland allowed guests to return to the park following its lengthy closure due to the COVID-19 pandemic.

==== 1955 version ====
The original version of the ride, uniquely titled Snow White and her Adventures, was designed by Claude Coats and Ken Anderson, both largely responsible for the look of the 1937 feature film. Snow White herself did not appear, as the ride was intended to be from the perspective of the titular heroine. In response to guests' confusion, a single Snow White figure was added in the early 1970s, as photographic evidence suggests.

The loading queue featured a mural of scenes in the attraction and characters from the 1937 film. Guests boarded one-seat ride vehicles rendered in the style of the Dwarfs' furniture from the film. The vehicles were replaced with two-seat versions in the 1960s.

Guests were shuttled forth and made a ninety-degree turn toward the entrance to the Dwarfs' diamond mine at the far-left end of the mural. All was dark at first, but riders soon ventured through underground tunnels fitted with rows of wooden beams, with gems shining along the rock wall. Guests approached a forced-perspective mural of a seemingly endless mineshaft before turning and passing into the mine's gem vault. The vault door was held open by Dopey (rendered as a plywood flat), peaking out and grinning at riders as they passed. Inside was the Dwarfs' stock of jewels, piled high into glistening mounds within kegs and mine carts. Guests continued deeper into the mine, where the other dwarfs were seen picking away to an instrumental variant of the Dig-a Dig Dig song. Heading to the left, riders encountered Dopey again (this time a fully dimensional animated figure), pointing worriedly to a sign reading, "BEWARE OF THE WITCH."

Guests exited the mine into a serene forest, where many animals such as deer, birds, and rabbits looked on from behind the trees. Ahead was a fork in the road marked by a wooden sign pointing in one direction to the Dwarfs' cottage and to the Queen's castle in the other. For a moment guests approached a forced-perspective mural of the cottage, but turned instead into the direction of the castle. The scene then shifted from a peaceful and pleasant forest into one of gnarled tree roots, dead vines, and muddy colors as riders passed under two vultures perched overhead. Guests then turned left toward the open entrance to castle. Directly ahead, within the castle's dim interior, was a passage leading back outside, where another wooden sign signified the Dwarfs' cottage. As guests advanced toward the open doorway, however, a wrought-iron portcullis slammed shut, blocking the way out. At the end of a dark corridor, a skeleton chained to the wall rattled and moaned at guests to go back.

Riders then veered away under a stone arch and saw the hunched shadow of the Witch in front of them, creeping across a wall plastered with a large spider web. Hanging strings simulating cobwebs brushed against guests' faces as they passed under another arch. Rounding a sharp turn, riders encountered the Witch at her cauldron offering them the poisoned apple, before being jolted away into a dark corner. Guests came face to face with the Witch again from behind a stone column before escaping the dungeon by crashing through a solid masonry wall. They found themselves in a frightful woods featuring looming and gnarled trees. Beyond the forest was the inviting sight of the Dwarfs' cottage. As riders drew near, the front door opened to reveal the Witch inside, apple still in hand. Finally, in a scene mirroring the climax of the film, riders approached the Witch on a cliff. Cackling maniacally, she attempted to pry a boulder onto guests from above. She is struck by a bolt of lightning with a shriek just before guests escaped through a camouflaged set of crash doors within the rock surface below her. After a final short stretch of darkness, guests returned to the loading area to disembark.

In January 1961, a number of updates were made to the Snow White dark ride by a team of Imagineers headed by Yale Gracey. These included improved, rebuilt figures of the Witch replacing several of the cruder models present on opening day, fully dimensional trees in the dark forest scene replacing the original plywood flats, and various new details such as ambient sound effects. Snow White and her Adventures ceased operation in December 1981 for a major overhaul coinciding with the New Fantasyland project, a dramatic reimagining of Fantasyland where most of its attractions and architecture were improved with far more intricate theming and superior technology. The updated Snow White attraction, Snow White's Scary Adventures, opened in May 1983.

==== 1983 version ====
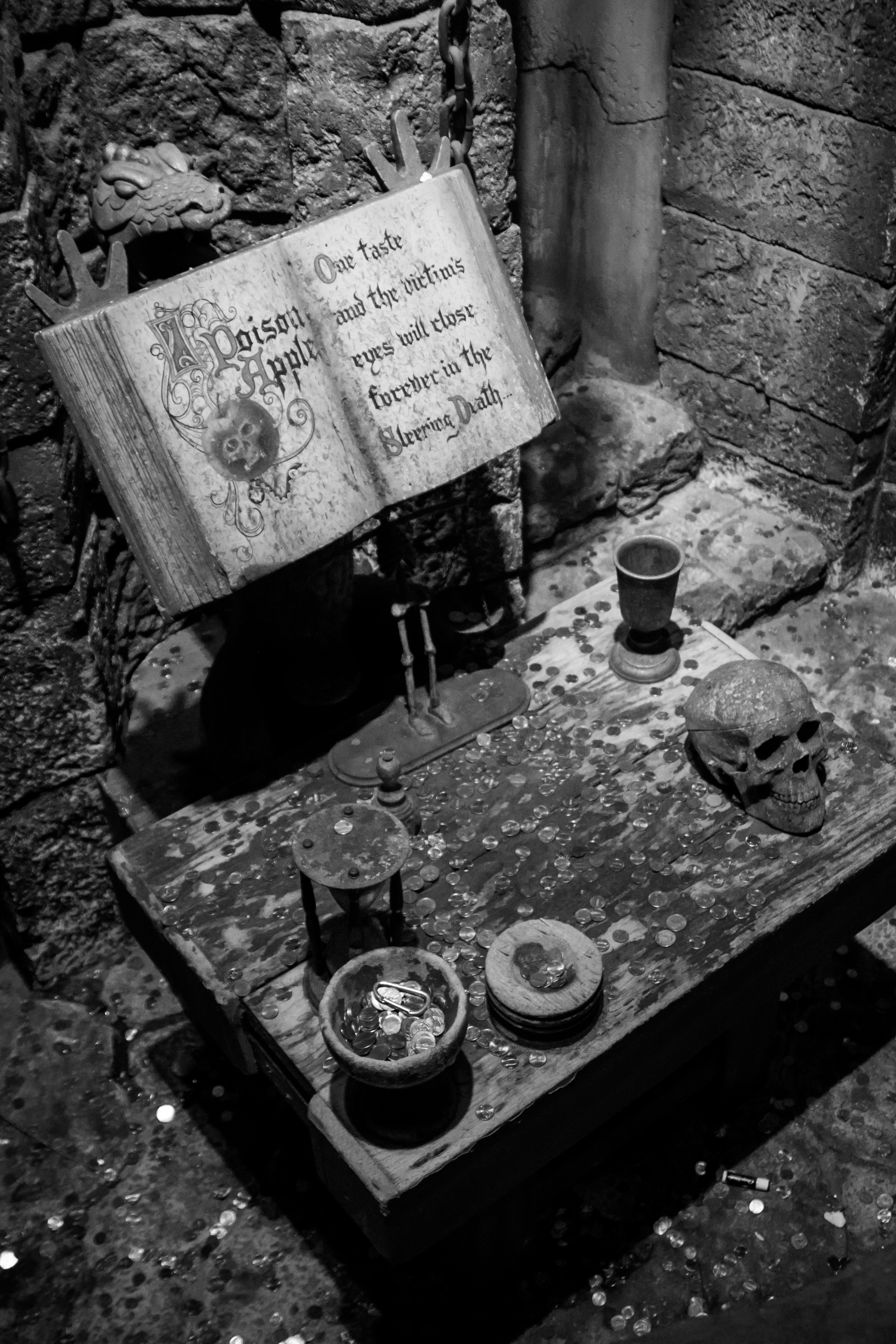
The Evil Queen's book of spells in the dungeon

Guests entered the ride building through the Evil Queen's castle. Overlooking the entrance was a high window whose curtains are parted every few minutes by the Evil Queen. A metal, gold-colored apple next to a spellbook that was within reach of guests standing in the queue. Touching the apple caused the disembodied voice of the Queen to cackle menacingly. Guests wound their way through a dungeon inside the castle, passing by a book of poisons. The book read, "One taste of the poisoned apple and the victim's eyes will close forever in the Sleeping Death." Like most of the dark rides, the boarding area was dominated by a large mural depicting characters from the movie.

The ride vehicles resemble mine carts and feature the names of each of the Seven Dwarfs, much like their beds in the film. When guests boarded the ride vehicles, they entered the Dwarfs' cottage first and heard music and yodeling from "The Silly Song", while birds, chipmunks, and other forest creatures perform housekeeping tasks such as hanging a clothesline and washing the dishes. Guests passed Snow White and her animal friends climbing the stairs to the second floor of the cottage. The guests then moved past the Dwarfs, who are performing "The Silly Song".

When guests left the cottage, they passed by the Queen who is spying on the festivities through the window. After a view of the Queen's castle in the distance, guests entered the Dwarfs' diamond mine, which is full of colorful jewels. Guests passed under a branch with two vultures perched on it and enter the Queen's castle. The Queen is facing her mirror, saying, "Magic Mirror on the wall..." before turning around to reveal herself as a hideous witch, adding "With this disguise, I'll fool them all!" This effect is achieved by two models—one queen and one witch—rotating on different sides of the 'mirror', which is actually a sheet of transparent glass. Projections and LED lights created the effect of cobwebs and electricity running through the walls. Guests went through the castle dungeon, laden with skeletons. They came to the Witch at her cauldron, creating a poisoned apple for Snow White. Upon turning a corner, guests encountered her again, emerging from a tunnel in a boat and enticing them with the apple.

Guests wound their way through a menacing forest filled with sinister trees, bats flying around, and logs resembling crocodiles. Coming upon the Dwarfs' cottage, the door opened to reveal the Witch offering riders the apple again. Guests turned towards a mountainside where the Dwarfs pursued the Witch, who tried to roll a boulder down the mountain to crush the Dwarfs below. However, a strike of lightning caused her to tumble to her death, with her scream heard as guests exited the area.

Returning to the boarding and debarkation area, guests passed a giant book featuring a silhouette of Snow White and her Prince with his horse as they wander away towards a castle. The words at the bottom of this picture read, "And they lived happily ever after." The guests then disembarked from the ride vehicles and returned to Fantasyland.

The installation at Disneyland was manufactured by Arrow Development.

This version of the attraction closed in January 2020.

==== 2021 version ====
Walt Disney Imagineering's intention was to make the ride less scary and to balance the "three core audiences" of adults, teens, and kids. They went on to say that the latest version of the ride also tells the complete story instead of the ride's 1983 version, which mostly concluded on a cliffhanger, and that the new ending makes it clear that Snow White and the Prince are the ones who lived "happily ever after". The project had an unlikely start when Walt Disney Imagineering intern David Borning brought in a model and sold the office on the idea.

Guests once again enter the ride building through the Evil Queen's castle, now repainted and refurbished to complement the color scheme of Sleeping Beauty Castle. The bronze spell book and apple are replaced by a storybook beginning the tale of Snow White. Inside the queue, the dungeon has been transformed into Snow White's bedroom, with the storybook detailing how Snow White ran away and found the Seven Dwarfs. The boarding area is now refreshed with more greenery, forest creatures, and a new projection on the window of the Dwarfs' cottage showing the silhouettes of Snow White and the Dwarfs dancing.

The guests' journey again begins in the Dwarfs' cottage, but with the added scent of apple pie. Guests pass Snow White's animal friends on the staircase watching the Dwarfs, who are performing "The Silly Song", with Snow White now dancing alongside Sneezy and Dopey.

After guests leave the cottage and see the Evil Queen, they pass through a happier version of the woods as a projection shows the Dwarfs marching and singing "Heigh-Ho", replacing the view of the Queen's castle. In the mine, Dopey is spotted waving at guests in a mine cart with diamonds in his eyes. The mine is now shimmering with more jewels, new projections, and Doc admiring and inspecting diamonds.

Exiting the mine, guests again pass the vultures and see the Queen transform into the Witch. The skeletons in the dungeon are replaced by chemicals and experiments, as well as the Witch's spell book detailing the poisoned apple recipe. Guests again encounter the Witch at her cauldron, albeit with enhanced lighting and projections added. The castle tunnel where the Witch previously appeared on a boat now features a magic mirror projection showing Snow White biting into the apple as the mirror shatters.

The most significant changes are in the final act, which highlights Snow White's happy ending over the Witch's demise. Guests come across a relocated and altered scene of the Dwarfs pursuing the Witch on the cliff, now featuring a projection showing the Witch running from the Dwarfs. Turning the corner into an enchanted forest, the Prince kisses Snow White to awaken her from the spell. The Dwarfs' cottage is still present but with the storybook placed in front of the door, which reads "True Love's Kiss Awakened Snow White and the good Dwarfs danced for joy." The final scene shows Snow White reunited with all her animal friends with the Prince and his horse awaiting her.

Returning to the loading/unloading area, guests pass the giant book featuring a silhouette of Snow White and her Prince with his horse as they wander away towards a castle. The words at the bottom of this picture read, "And they lived happily ever after" and "Snow White's wish had come true!" The guests then disembark from the ride vehicles and return to Fantasyland.

=== Magic Kingdom ===
Magic Kingdom's original version of this ride also puts the guests in the role of the story's main character (Snow White). Around Christmas of 1994, a less frightening version of the ride took its place and appearances of Snow White were also added. The redesigned ride took some cues from the version at Disneyland Paris, including increasing the capacity of each vehicle from four to six passengers. On February 23, 2012, Disney announced that the ride would close on May 31. Two years after its closure, another Snow White attraction opened, Seven Dwarfs Mine Train.

==== 1971 version ====
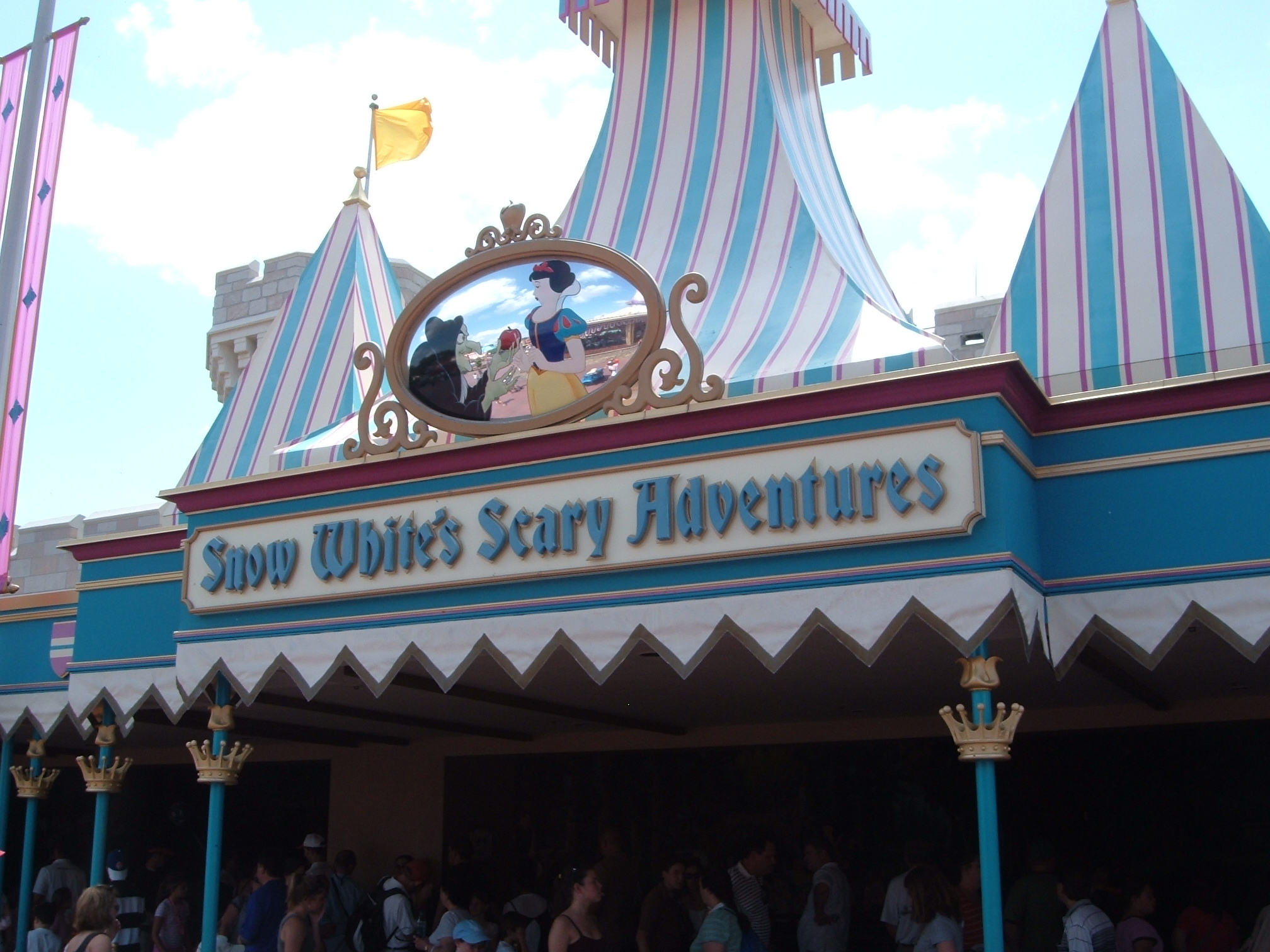
The Magic Kingdom location

The original version of the ride at Magic Kingdom in Florida which ran from 1971 to 1994 was very different, and considerably more frightening. Snow White was not seen at all, and the Dwarfs showed up only briefly in one scene. The queue was similar to Tokyo Disneyland's current queue. It featured the Dwarfs' mine, with their cottage visible in the distance. Guests began by entering the castle in a scene very much like the 1994 ride; however, there was no part where Snow White was seen cleaning. Instead, riders saw a side of the Dwarfs' cottage as "I'm Wishing" played in the background. Upon entering, with the queen watching in a nearby window, the guests saw a mirror, but not the magic one. The Queen transformed into the Witch, loudly proclaiming, "Mirror Mirror on the wall, I am the fairest one of all!" Guests passed through the dungeon with skeletons, then saw the Witch at the cauldron preparing the poisoned apple. The riders then "crashed" through the dungeon walls and escaped through the forest with the tree monsters and the crocodile logs (still bumping into the Witch, who was on a boat). Soon, guests arrived in the Dwarfs' cottage to see the animals peering in at them. The animals and even the furniture appear frightened. They then passed the Dwarfs (in their only appearance) walking up the stairs to their room to investigate a frightening shadow. The Witch was waiting in the doorway with the apple. Riders would then exit the cottage, back into the woods, and pass by two ominous vultures. The final scene was the diamond mine, where the Witch appeared several more times. Her final appearance was on top of a doorway, dislodging an enormous jewel onto the riders (in much the same way as she tries to crush the Dwarfs with a huge rock near the end of the film). Riders would then enter a room full of flashing cartoon-like strobe lights (similar to Alice in Wonderland at Disneyland in California prior to 1984) with the Witch's cackling echoing in their ears. The ending implies that the riders were crushed by the jewel and were killed. Guests then unceremoniously disembarked. Ginny Tyler did the voice of the Evil Queen in this version, while Jimmy MacDonald did the voice of Doc. The ride closed for a refurbishment and re-opened in 1994.

==== 1994 version ====
On October 14, 1994, the Magic Kingdom attraction was closed in order to undergo a redesign in order to be similar to the Disneyland version, but in a different order with a few new scenes. The attraction re-opened on December 16, 1994, with a much lighter tone. Guests boarded the ride by a mural depicting the characters of Snow White and the Seven Dwarfs, and began their ride in the Queen's courtyard where Snow White was seen working outside. The Queen watched her (and the guests) from her window. Inside the castle, the scene was similar to the Disneyland version (with the Queen turning into the Witch and working at the cauldron), although the Magic Mirror was added who said, "Alas! Snow White is the fairest one of all," to which the Queen replied, "Never!" The ride continued into the forest where the Huntsman tells Snow White to "run away and never come back! Go!" and strobe lighting effects that resembled lightning lit up Snow White running through the tree monsters, and then into the Dwarfs' cottage where the "Dwarfs' Yodel Song" played. In a new scene, the riders then passed the Witch giving Snow White the apple, then emerged from the cottage as she gloated that she was the fairest one of all. From there, guests rode through the mine where two of the Dwarfs (Bashful and Sneezy) called to them to stop the Witch. After the scene where the Witch tried to drop a rock on the dwarfs, there was a new ending with the Prince waking Snow White and then leading her away on his horse as two of the Dwarfs waved goodbye. Dopey was seen above the bridge, waving to all the passengers. Guests then traveled through the open doors under the bridge and disembarked.

=== Tokyo Disneyland ===
Tokyo Disneyland's ride is a mix of the other versions. The first half closely resembles the 1971 Disney World version, with guests seeing the Witch's transformation, watching her creating the poisoned apple in the dungeon, passing her on a boat, and then winding through the spooky forest. Upon entering the cottage, the ride switches to the 1983 Disneyland version, where the Dwarfs perform The Silly Song with Snow White watching from the stairs. Exiting the cottage, guests find the Witch outside waiting for them rather than the Queen. since the transformation already happened earlier in the ride, The vultures are watching at the entrance to the Dwarfs' mine, which is slightly longer and has a more menacing atmosphere. Inside the mine, a cart full of gems rolls toward guests, which was an element of the original Disney World version. Guests exit the mine and approach the cottage again, where they encounter the Witch holding the apple. The Dwarves pursue the Witch up a cliff as she tries to drop a boulder to crush them. The ride then ends immediately, without the prince kiss and happy ending．

=== Disneyland Park (Paris) ===
Disneyland Park (Paris)'s ride is nearly the same as the 1983 Disneyland version. The final scene is similar to the 1994 Disney World ride's happier ending, in which guests pass under an arch with the Prince's castle visible in the distance. However, all the characters in the scene are on the arch bidding farewell to riders, rather than only Dopey. The castle is also on guests' left in the Paris version, and there is no preceding scene in which the Prince awakens Snow White with a kiss. Another notable element is that the mine features a cart full of gems rolling toward guests, which is derived from the 1971 Disney World original. The ride is called Blanche Neige et les Sept Nains, French for Snow White and the Seven Dwarfs.

== Gallery ==
Disneyland's attraction poster (1983-2020)

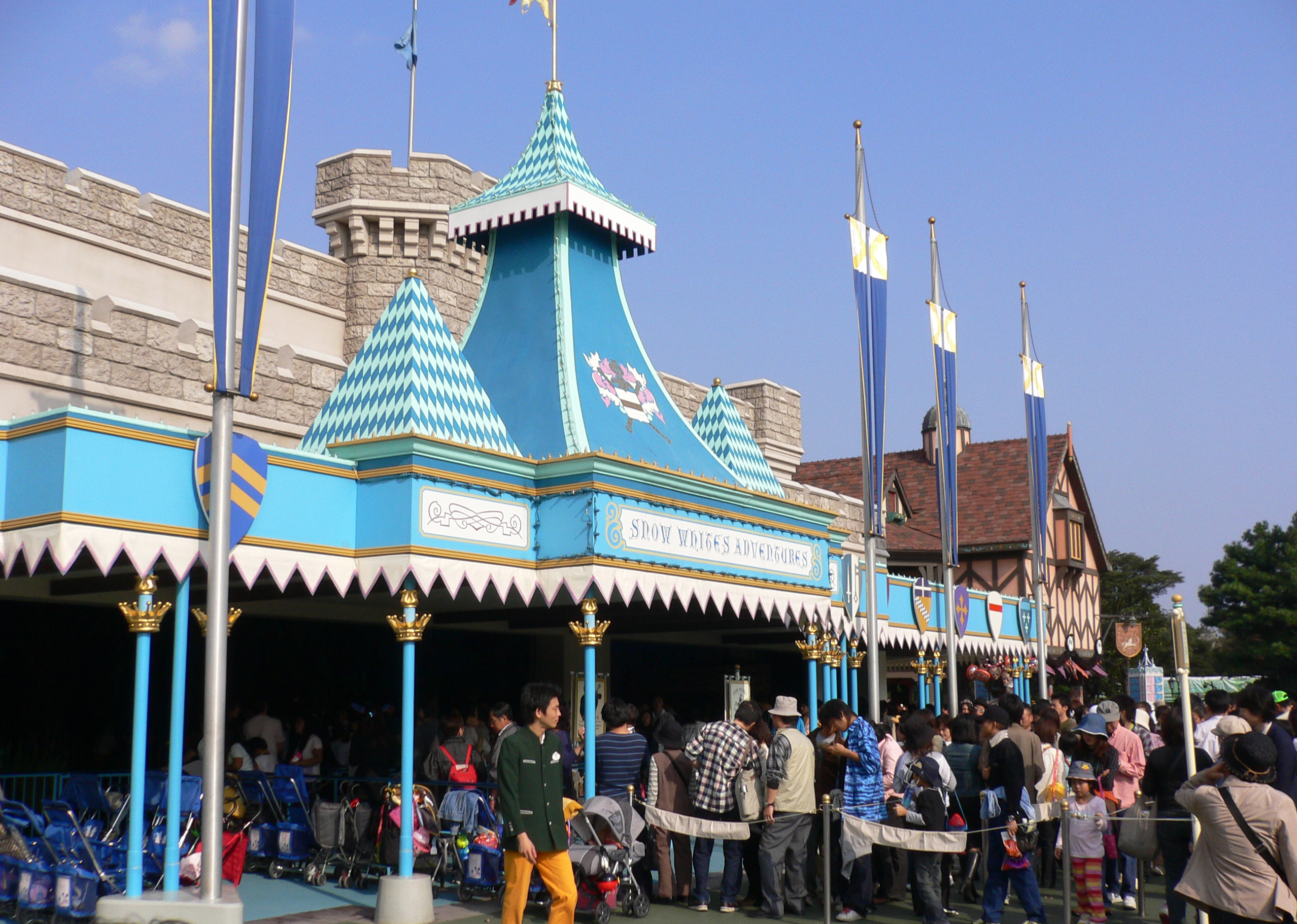
Tokyo Disneyland version

Snow White's Scary Adventures entrance at Disneyland (1983–2020)

Disneyland's attraction poster (2021-present)

== See also ==
- Mr. Toad's Wild Ride
- Peter Pan's Flight
