= Claude Coats =

American background artist (1913–1992)

- Born: January 17, 1913; San Francisco, California
- Died: January 9, 1992 (aged 78); Burbank, California, U.S.
- Education: Polytechnic High School, University of Southern California
- Occupations: Painter, Animator, Walt Disney Imagineering, formerly known as WED Enterprises
- Years active: 1935-1989
- Employer: Walt Disney Animation Studios (1937-1957)
- Board member of: Walt Disney Imagineering
- Website: www.claudecoats.com

Claude Coats (January 17, 1913 – January 9, 1992) was an American artist, background artist, animator and set designer, known for his work with the Walt Disney Animation Studios and Walt Disney Imagineering. His pioneering work with the company helped define the character of animated films, and later, immersive installations with his designs for Disneyland. Coats, known as "The Gentle Giant" was inducted a Disney Legend in 1991.

== Personal life ==
Claude Coats was raised in Los Angeles and graduated from Polytechnic High School. On an athletic scholarship, Coats attended University of Southern California as an architecture student, but later received his bachelor's degree in drawing in 1934. He later attended Chouinard Art Institute and studied watercolor painting with Paul Sample. Upon matriculation, Coats became an active member of the California Water Color Society, which garnered the interest of the film industry. Coats accepted an interview at Disney's Hyperion Studio and began an apprenticeship in background painting in 1935. While working at the studio, Claude met his future wife, Evelyn Henry, an inker in the Ink and Paint Department. The couple were married in July 1937 and went on to have two sons, Alan and Lee.

Claude and Evelyn were avid world travelers. They visited remote locations at Petra, Jordan, and Machu Picchu, long before these became popular tourist destinations. They joined the first American tour groups to visit China when that country was opened to Western visitors. Claude would return with a sketchbook and film to create vivid paintings of his travels. When he decided it was time to discover Antarctica, Claude realized his long-time dream to visit all seven continents. Penguins would become a favorite subject to paint and sculpt.

== Career as background painter ==
Coats' earliest film work included the 1935 animated shorts Mickey's Fire Brigade and Pluto's Judgement Day. He also painted backgrounds for the Silly Symphony musical shorts, earning him membership to the Academy of Motion Picture Arts and Sciences. His distinctive, layered style is prominently featured in the Oscar winners The Old Mill and Ferdinand the Bull. He was personally selected as one of the artists by Walt Disney to paint the backgrounds for the studio's first full-length film, Snow White and the Seven Dwarfs, also the first full-length animated film created in the United States. He would continue his contributions and color styling to over twenty other Disney animated films.

== Career as Imagineer ==
In 1955, Coats was again appointed by Disney to the staff of WED Enterprises (now known as Walt Disney Imagineering). This "second career" as one of Disneyland's art directors and show designers brought his dynamic film sets to an immersive, three-dimensional space. These designs, along with those of Mary Blair, themed the Carousel of Progress, Ford Magic Skyway and It's a Small World at the 1964 New York World's Fair as well as WDI's future installations. Coats would go on to serve as the designer for Mr. Toad's Wild Ride, Snow White's Scary Adventures, Pirates of the Caribbean, World of Motion and Horizons. Until his retirement in November 1989, Coats would go on to do major designs at every extant Disney theme park, including the Magic Kingdom, EPCOT, Tokyo Disneyland and Disneyland Paris.

== Awards ==
In 1991, he was awarded the Disney Legends award.

== Selected filmography ==
Year	Title	Credits	Notes
1937	Snow White and the Seven Dwarfs	Background Artist	
1940	Pinocchio	Background Artist	
1940	Fantasia	Background Artist - Segments "The Sorcerer's Apprentice" and "The Pastoral Symphony"	
1941	Dumbo	Background Artist	
1943	Saludos Amigos (Short)	Background Artist	Credited as Claude Coates
1943	Victory Through Air Power (Documentary)	Background Artist	
1945	The Three Caballeros	Background Artist	
1945	Tiger Trouble (Short)	Background Artist	
1945	Dog Watch (Short)	Background Artist	
1945	Californy er Bust (Short)	Background Artist	
1946	Make Mine Music	Background Artist	
1946	Song of the South	Background Artist and Color Stylist	
1947	Fun & Fancy Free	Background Artist	
1948	Melody Time	Color and Styling	
1948	Cat Nap Pluto (Short)	Background Artist	
1949	The Adventures of Ichabod and Mr. Toad	Color and Styling	
1950	Cinderella	Color and Styling	
1950	Motor Mania (Short)	Background Artist	
1951	Alice in Wonderland	Color and Styling	
1952	Uncle Donald's Ants (Short)	Background Artist	
1952	The Little House (Short)	Background Artist	
1953	Peter Pan	Color and Styling	
1953	How to Dance (Short)	Background Artist	
1953	How to Sleep (Short)	Background Artist	
1953	Ben and Me (Short)	Art Director	
1955	Lady and the Tramp	Background Artist	
1955	Up a Tree (Short)	Background Artist	
1956	Hooked Bear (Short)	Background Artist	
1955 - 1967	The Magical World of Disney (TV Series)	Background Artist - 15 Episodes	
1957	The Magical World of Disney (TV Series)	Animation Art Styling - 1 Episode	
1965	The Magical World of Disney (TV Series)	Himself - Disneyland 10th Anniversary	
1984	DTV: Rock, Rhythm & Blues (Video)	Background Artist	
1984	DTV: Pop & Rock (Video)	Background Artist	
1984	DTV: Golden Oldies (Video)	Background Artist	
1988	The South Bank Show (TV Series Documentary)	Himself - Background Artist - The Art of Walt Disney	
1988	It All Started with a Mouse: The Disney Story (TV Movie)	Himself - Background Artist	
2000	Fantasia 2000	Background Artist - Segment "The Sorcerer's Apprentice"	

== Walt Disney Imagineering ==
- Mr. Toad's Wild Ride (1955)
- Rainbow Caverns Mine Train (1956)
- Alice in Wonderland (1958)
- Grand Canyon Diorama (1958)
- Submarine Voyage (1959)
- Ford Magic Skyway (1964)
- Carousel of Progress (1964)
- It's a Small World (1964)
- Pirates of the Caribbean (1967)
- Adventure Thru Inner Space (1967)
- Haunted Mansion (1969)
- Snow White's Scary Adventures (1971)
- Mickey Mouse Revue (1971)
- 20,000 Leagues Under the Sea: Submarine Voyage (1971)
- If You Had Wings (1972)
- Universe of Energy (1982)
- World of Motion (1982)
- Horizons (1983)
