= Peter Pan's Flight =

Dark ride at Disney theme parks

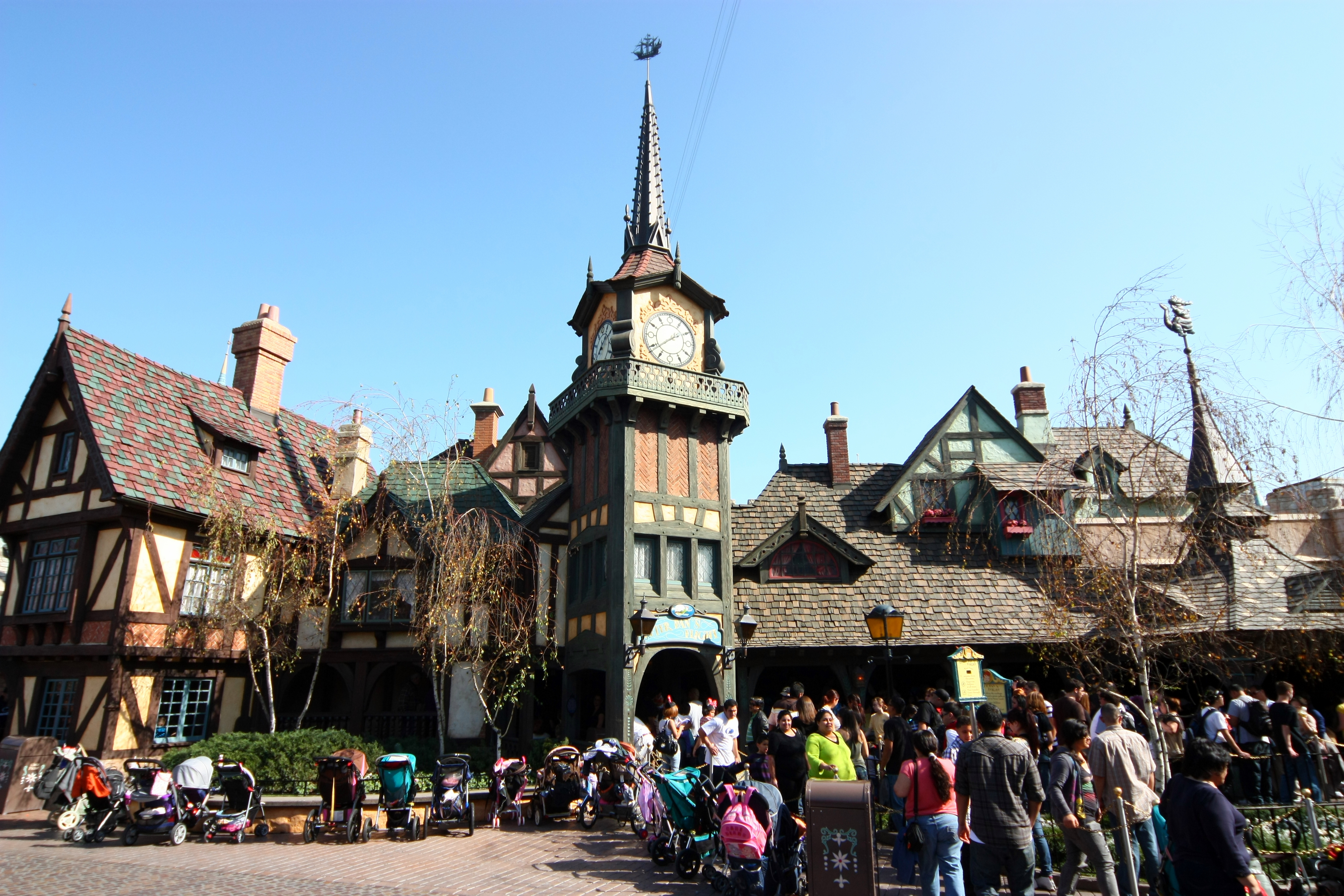
- Peter Pan's Flight at Disneyland

Disneyland
- Area: Fantasyland
- Coordinates: 33.8131°N 117.9187°W
- Status: Operating
- Opening date: July 17, 1955

Magic Kingdom
- Area: Fantasyland (Castle Courtyard)
- Coordinates: 28.42°N 81.5816°W
- Status: Operating
- Opening date: October 3, 1971
- Lightning Lane available

Tokyo Disneyland
- Name: ピーターパン空の旅(in Japanese)
- Area: Fantasyland
- Coordinates: 35.6319°N 139.8818°E
- Status: Operating
- Opening date: April 15, 1983

Disneyland Park (Paris)
- Area: Fantasyland
- Coordinates: 48.8737N 2.7739E
- Status: Operating
- Opening date: April 12, 1992
- Disney Premier Access available

Shanghai Disneyland Park
- Name: 小飞侠天空奇遇
- Area: Fantasyland
- Status: Operating
- Opening date: June 16, 2016
- Disney Premier Access available

Ride statistics
- Attraction type: Rail-suspended dark ride
- Manufacturers: Cleveland Tram Rail Company (Disneyland)Arrow Development (Walt Disney World), Zamperla & Bertala (Disneyland Paris)
- Designer: Walt Disney Imagineering
- Theme: Peter Pan
- Height: 17 ft (5.2 m)
- Vehicle type: Pirate Ship
- Riders per vehicle: 2-4
- Sponsor: NTT Communications (Tokyo Disneyland)
- Must transfer from wheelchair

Peter Pan's Flight is a rail-suspended dark ride at the Disneyland, Magic Kingdom, Tokyo Disneyland, Disneyland Park (Paris) and Shanghai Disneyland theme parks. Located in the Fantasyland area of each park, its story, music, staging, and artwork are based on Walt Disney's Peter Pan, the 1953 animated film version of the classic Peter Pan story by J. M. Barrie. It is also one of the few remaining attractions that was operational on Disneyland's opening day in 1955, although the original version was entirely redesigned in 1983. Five of the six Disney resort destinations feature it, each with a unique exterior, walk-through queue and ride experience.

== History ==
The original intent of the attraction was for guests to fly through the ride as if they themselves were Peter Pan. Most guests did not quite grasp this concept, however, and were left wondering why Peter was not in the attraction. The Walt Disney World version of the ride, which opened two days after the park's grand opening on October 3, 1971, added scenes with Peter and made use of Audio-Animatronic figures.

In 1983, Disneyland's Fantasyland underwent a major redesign. Some of its rides were relocated to make way for expanded versions of existing dark rides and the addition of a new one. The new Fantasyland resembled a rustic Alpine village rather than a medieval fair. Peter Pan's Flight continued to feature a colorful mural depicting the characters from the film, and Peter Pan was added to various scenes, including an Audio-Animatronic version of him. The original Pirate Ship Restaurant and Skull Rock were removed, and the riggings, lanterns, and other props from the restaurant were added to Peter Pan's Flight.

A 2024 update to Magic Kingdom's Peter Pan's Flight attraction would retain Tiger Lily, but replace the film's other Indian characters, including Tiger Lily's father who actually appeared in the film, with a new group of "less caricatured" characters including Tiger Lily's grandmother and with modern outfits.

== Voice Cast ==
- Ronnie McMillan - Peter Pan
- Bobby Driscoll - Peter Pan (archival recordings)
- Corey Burton - Captain Hook / Mr. Smee

== Attraction ==
=== Disneyland ===
==== Original version (1955–1982) ====
The earliest version of Peter Pan's Flight debuted at Disneyland on the park's opening day in July 1955. This iteration of the attraction was the shortest in length and contained the fewest animated figures and simplest audio. The queue line was largely external, and its exterior façade resembled a colorful medieval tournament tent adorned with stripes and decorative shields. As with contemporary opening-day Fantasyland dark rides Snow White's Enchanted Wish and Mr. Toad's Wild Ride, guests boarded ride vehicles in front of a massive, elaborate mural adorned with characters and settings from the film on which the ride was based. Peter Pan himself did not appear in the original ride at all (aside from his depiction on the mural), nor did the Darling children, the Lost Boys, the mermaids, or the Native Americans (save for a captive Tiger Lily in the final scene).

The 1955 Peter Pan attraction laid the foundation for the basic three-act structure that most subsequent versions of the ride have adhered to. Following the first brief scene inside the Darling children's nursery (only about three-fifths its current size), guests sailed over the moonlit London skyline (much the same as it is today), the fantastical realm of Neverland (seen entirely from an aerial perspective, with no close-up vignettes or characters), and finally into the cavernous Skull Rock, where a sword-wielding Captain Hook ordered the bumbling Mr. Smee to shoot down riders as they flew by. The final sight in the attraction was Tick Tock the crocodile, staring intently at guests, his mouth agape, just before they exited the scene through a set of doors disguised as a waterfall and returned to the loading area.

This simpler version of the attraction existed until 1982, when it was closed as part of the major redesign of the New Fantasyland, where nearly all of the area's architecture and attractions were updated with richer theming and new technology. A significantly enhanced version of Peter Pan's Flight debuted in May 1983, and is largely the same version that exists today.

==== Expanded version (since 1983) ====
Departing from the station, but before entering the actual ride building, guests fly over the rooftops of London. The new version of the ride includes Audio-Animatronic versions of the characters, like at the Magic Kingdom in Florida. As part of the new remodel, scenes from the Florida ride were added to Disneyland, including the pirate ship deck where Peter and Hook duel on the tip of the ship's bowsprit (at the Magic Kingdom Peter and Hook duel on the ship's mainsail). Few scenes are identical between the two versions, but they are very similar nonetheless.

Attraction poster

The new Disneyland ride opened as part of New Fantasyland on May 25, 1983. After winding through the queue, guests board a three-passenger miniature galleon, which is suspended from a track on the ceiling above to enhance the sensation of flying through the air. The ship leaves the load area and winds through the Darlings' nursery, passing Nana the Saint Bernard dog nursemaid next to some toy blocks which spell "D1SN3Y" when read backwards. Wendy, John and Michael Darling are on the bed and Peter Pan's shadow is on the wall.

Guests hear Peter Pan saying, "Come on, everybody! Here we go!" At this point, the ship flies out of the nursery window and over moonlit London. Lights from Tinker Bell twinkle all around. Below guests are miniature versions of some of London's famous landmarks, including St Paul's Cathedral, Big Ben, the Tower Bridge and the River Thames.

Then, going past "the second star to the right and straight on 'til morning," the flying ships reach Neverland, where guests pass some of its landmarks, including the Indian village, a glowing volcano, a giant octopus, three colored fish, The Lost Boys' camp, Mermaid Lagoon, and Skull Rock. It is here that guests encounter some of Neverland's most famous residents, including Princess Tiger Lily, Mr. Smee, Tick-Tock the Crocodile and Peter's arch-rival, Captain Hook, in addition to Peter and the Darlings.

On February 2, 2015, the attraction closed for refurbishment. Its reopening date, which was originally scheduled for May 21, 2015, was pushed back to July 1, 2015. The refurbishment included new animatronics, including a scene of Wendy, John, and Michael flying above John's bed in the Nursery. It also added new special effects to the London and Neverland scenes.

=== Magic Kingdom ===
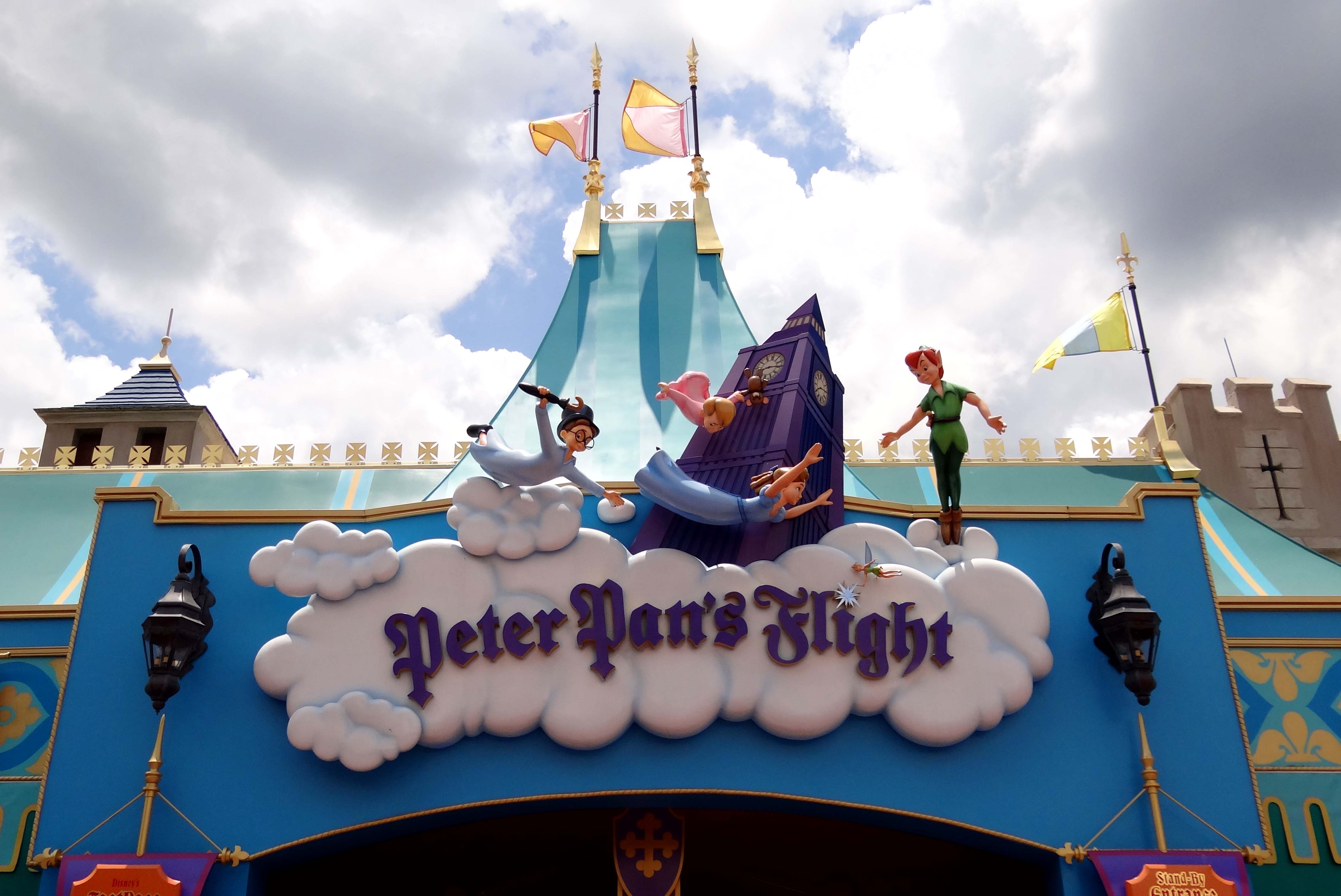
Magic Kingdom

The load/unload area features Omnimover-style moving ramps, like those found at the Haunted Mansion, to allow for a smoother flow of traffic. The scenes in the ride are on a larger scale and feature Audio-Animatronic figures. It reuses audio and sound effects from the 1955 Disneyland version. Upon entering the very beginning of the nursery, a play tea party featuring two famous toys, Raggedy Ann and Andy, can be seen. The Lost Boys camp and Mermaid Lagoon are now a part of the Never Land scene. Also, Hook's 48-foot pirate ship is included, complete with deck, masts, sails and rigging. Guests see Hook and Peter engaged in hand-to-hand combat on the mainsail, while the boys are lashed to the mast and Wendy is about to walk the plank. Then, guests see Peter and the Darlings posed victoriously on the ship, poised to sail into the sky, back to London.

In 2014, this version was upgraded to include an updated indoor queue, wherein the old restrooms were removed, the new queue starts by entering into a corridor with interactive murals, it then leads guests into the Darling family residence, with a special emphasis on the nursery. This new queue has an extremely high attention to detail.

=== Disneyland Paris ===
Peter Peter Pan's Flight at Disneyland Paris

One of the most popular attractions at Disneyland Paris, Peter Pan's Flight is a dark ride that sees guests boarding "flying" pirate ships which are suspended from an overhead rail, plus soaring over miniature recreations of London and Neverland. This version is slightly longer than the original, with a complete circuit taking around 3 minutes, and beginning with a short flight over London at night.

=== Tokyo Disneyland ===
Peter Pan's Flight at Tokyo Disneyland opened in 1983 and its features are very similar to those of the Magic Kingdom version.

In early 2016, the attraction was renovated to include new digital effects. A new Neverland scene was added, where guests now fly over the island of Neverland at nighttime, before flying past the Lost Boys' hideout, the Mermaid Lagoon, and the Native American camp.

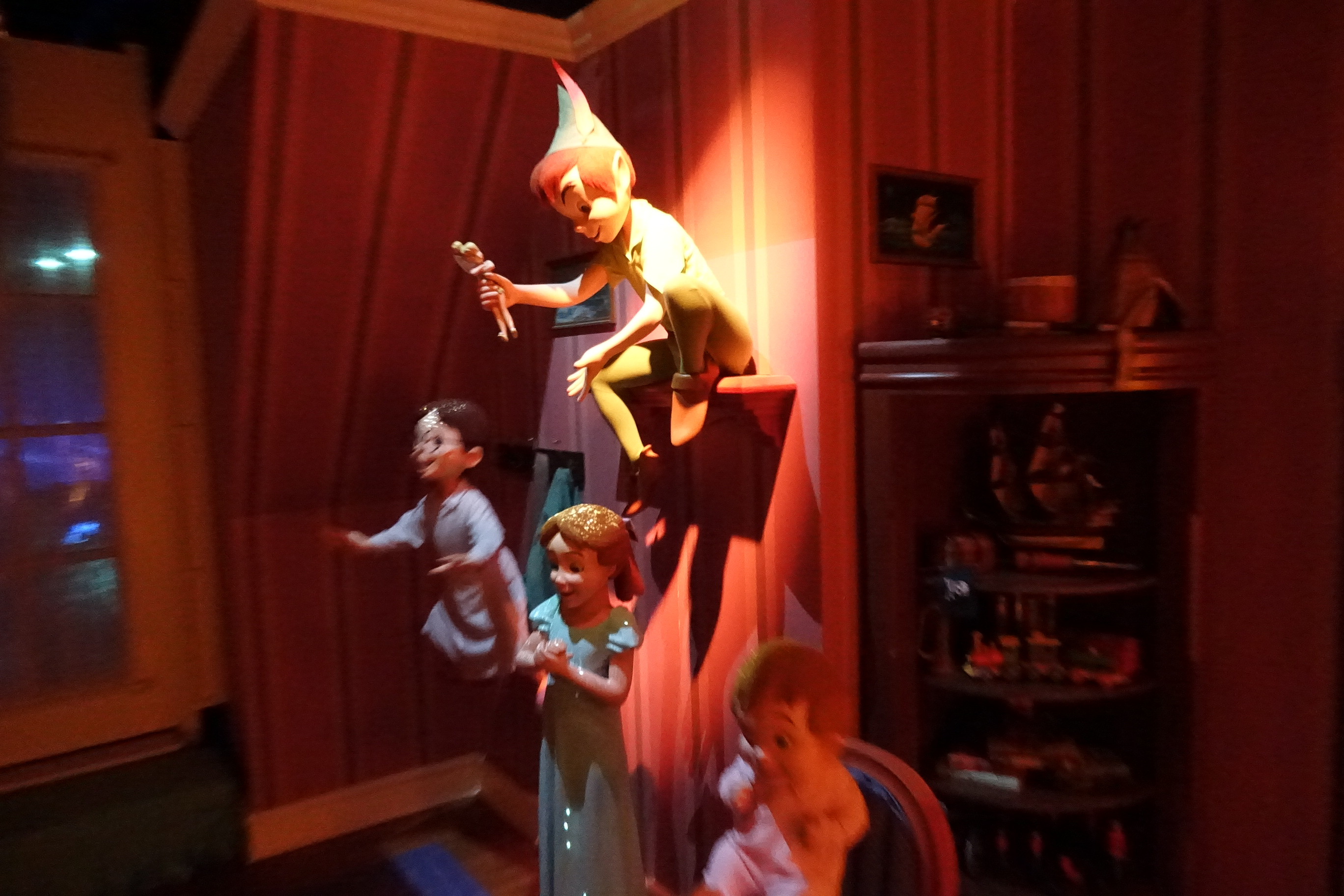
The scene of Peter Pan using Pixie Dust on the Darling children in the Shanghai Disneyland version of the attraction.

=== Shanghai Disneyland ===
Peter Pan's Flight opened with the rest of Shanghai Disneyland in 2016. Unlike previous iterations, this version features 4-person vehicles instead of 2. These vehicles also have the ability to stop and change speed, unlike before. The ride also includes enhanced versions of scenes from previous iterations, as well as new scenes, such as a "splashdown" into Skull Rock.

== See also ==
- Mr. Toad's Wild Ride
- Snow White's Enchanted Wish
