= List of programs broadcast by Cartoon Network =

Logo used by Cartoon Network since May 29, 2010

This is a list of television programs currently or formerly broadcast by Cartoon Network in the United States. The network was launched on October 1, 1992, and airs mainly animated programming, ranging from action to animated comedy. In its early years, Cartoon Network's programming was predominantly made up of reruns of Looney Tunes, Tom and Jerry, and Hanna-Barbera shows.

Cartoon Network's first original series was The Moxy Show and the late-night satirical animated talk show Space Ghost Coast to Coast (the latter moving to Adult Swim at launch on September 2, 2001). The What a Cartoon! series of showcase shorts brought the creation of many Cartoon Network original series collectives branded as "Cartoon Cartoons" in 1995. Cartoon Network has also broadcast several feature films, mostly animated or containing animated sequences, under its "Cartoon Theater" block, later renamed "Flicks".

== Current programming ==
=== Original programming ===
Title	Premiere date	Current season	Note(s)
Teen Titans Go!	April 23, 2013	9	(Note: Also aired on Boomerang)
We Baby Bears	January 1, 2022	2	(Note: Also airs on Discovery Family.)
Bugs Bunny Builders	July 25, 2022	2	
Batwheels	October 17, 2022	3	
Regular Show: The Lost Tapes	May 11, 2026	1	

=== Acquired programming ===
Title	Premiere date	Current season	Note(s)
Iyanu	April 5, 2025	2	
Grizzy & the Lemmings	July 18, 2026	3	

=== Repeats of ended programming ===
Title	Premiere date	Finale date(s)	Date(s) rerun	Note(s)
The New Scooby-Doo Movies	September 9, 1972	October 27, 1973	1994–2008; 2025–present	
The Scooby-Doo Show	September 11, 1976	December 23, 1978	1994–2005; 2024–present	
What's New, Scooby-Doo?	September 14, 2002	July 21, 2006	2006–16; 2023–present	
Scooby-Doo! Mystery Incorporated	April 5, 2010	April 5, 2013	2013–14; 2023–present	
Regular Show	September 6, 2010	January 16, 2017	2017; 2018; 2019; 2021; 2022; 2023–present	
The Amazing World of Gumball	May 3, 2011	June 24, 2019	2019–present	
The Looney Tunes Show	May 3, 2011	August 31, 2014	2023–present	
Uncle Grandpa	September 2, 2013	June 30, 2017	2021; 2022; 2023–present	
Steven Universe	November 4, 2013	January 21, 2019	2019; 2021; 2022–25; 2026–present	
The Tom and Jerry Show (2014)	April 9, 2014	March 12, 2016	2019; 2023–present	(Note: New episodes continued to air on Boomerang.)
Be Cool, Scooby-Doo!	October 5, 2015	March 18, 2018	2023–present	
Jellystone!	September 4, 2021	December 7, 2025	2025–present	(Note: Also an HBO Max original series.)
Tiny Toons Looniversity	September 9, 2023	December 6, 2025	2025–present	
The Heroic Quest of the Valiant Prince Ivandoe	November 11, 2023	January 31, 2026	2026–present	

== Upcoming programming ==
=== Original programming ===
Title	Premiere date	Source(s)
Barbara!	TBA	
Foster's Funtime for Imaginary Friends	TBA	
Heyo BMO	TBA	

== Former programming ==
An asterisk (*) indicates that the program initially aired as a Cartoon Network program.

A double-asterisk (**) indicates that the program became a Boomerang program.

A triple-asterisk (***) indicates that the program became an Adult Swim/Toonami program.

=== Original programming ===
==== Animated ====
Title	Premiere date	Finale date(s)	Date(s) rerun	Note(s)
Down Wit' Droopy D	October 2, 1992	1995	N/A	
ToonHeads	October 2, 1992	November 23, 2003	2003–05	
The Moxy Show	December 5, 1993	May 25, 1996	1996–2000	
Space Ghost Coast to Coast	April 15, 1994	July 22, 2001	2001–02	(Note: Acquired by and continued its run on Adult Swim.)
What a Cartoon!	February 20, 1995	November 28, 1997 (as main show); August 23, 2002 (as collective series)	2002–03	(Note: Renamed to The What a Cartoon! Show in 1996 and again to The Cartoon Cartoon Show in 2000.)
Dexter's Laboratory	April 27, 1996	November 20, 2003	2003–04; 2005–06; 2008; 2010; 2012–14; 2021; 2022	(Note: Reran as segments on The Cartoon Cartoon Show and Top 5 beginning in 2005.) (Note: Reran as segments on Cartoon Planet beginning in 2012.) (Note: Also aired on Adult Swim.)
The Real Adventures of Jonny Quest	August 26, 1996	April 16, 1997	1997–2003	(Note: Premiered concurrently on TBS and TNT)
The Tex Avery Show	November 1, 1996	June 15, 2002	2002–04	
Johnny Bravo	July 14, 1997	August 27, 2004	2004–10; 2012–14	
Cow and Chicken	July 15, 1997	August 13, 1999	1999–2003; 2005–06; 2009; 2012–13	
I Am Weasel	July 15, 1997	2000	2000–04; 2005–06; 2009; 2012–13	
Cartoon Planet*	September 10, 1997	February 4, 1998	N/A	
O Canada	1997	2002	N/A	
The Powerpuff Girls (original series)	November 18, 1998	March 25, 2005	2005–10; 2012–14; 2021–23; 2025	(Note: Also aired on Kids' WB!)
Ed, Edd n Eddy	January 4, 1999	November 8, 2009	2009–10; 2012–13; 2021–22	(Note: Not produced in-house.)
Mike, Lu & Og	November 12, 1999	May 27, 2001	2001–03	
Courage the Cowardly Dog	November 12, 1999	November 22, 2002	2002–04; 2005–09; 2010–14; 2015; 2021; 2022	
The Bob Clampett Show*	May 21, 2000	March 11, 2001	N/A	
Sheep in the Big City	November 17, 2000	April 7, 2002	2002–03	
Sealab 2021	December 21, 2000	December 30, 2000	N/A	
The Chuck Jones Show	April 8, 2001	2004	N/A	
Time Squad	June 8, 2001	November 26, 2003	2003; 2004–05	
Samurai Jack	August 10, 2001	September 25, 2004	2004–05; 2008; 2012; 2023	(Note: Aired as part of "ACME Night")
Grim & Evil	August 24, 2001	October 18, 2002	2002–03	
The Popeye Show	October 29, 2001	July 20, 2003	2003–04	
Justice League	November 17, 2001	May 29, 2004	N/A	
Whatever Happened to... Robot Jones?	July 19, 2002	November 14, 2003	2003–04; 2005–06	
Codename: Kids Next Door	December 6, 2002	January 21, 2008	2008–10; 2012–14; 2021–23	
The Grim Adventures of Billy & Mandy	June 13, 2003	November 9, 2007	2007–10; 2012–14; 2017; 2022	
Evil Con Carne	July 11, 2003	October 22, 2004	2004–06; 2012–13	
Teen Titans	July 19, 2003	September 15, 2006	2006–11; 2013–20; 2022–23	
Duck Dodgers	August 23, 2003	April 22, 2005	2005; 2025; 2026	
Megas XLR	May 1, 2004	January 15, 2005	2005–06	
Justice League Unlimited	July 31, 2004	May 13, 2006	N/A	(Note: Acquired by Vortexx.)
Foster's Home for Imaginary Friends	August 13, 2004	May 3, 2009	2009–10; 2012–13; 2014; 2021; 2022–23	
Hi Hi Puffy AmiYumi	November 19, 2004	June 27, 2006	2006	
The Life and Times of Juniper Lee	May 30, 2005	December 15, 2006	2006	
Camp Lazlo	July 8, 2005	March 27, 2008	2008–10; 2012–14	
Sunday Pants	October 2, 2005	October 30, 2005	2009	
My Gym Partner's a Monkey	December 26, 2005	November 27, 2008	2010; 2012–13	
Ben 10 (original series)	December 27, 2005	April 15, 2008	2008–2009; 2010–11; 2013–14; 2016–17; 2021; 2022; 2025–2026	
Squirrel Boy	May 29, 2006	September 27, 2007	2007–08; 2009	
Class of 3000	November 3, 2006	May 25, 2008	N/A	
Chowder	November 2, 2007	August 7, 2010	2010–11; 2012–13; 2021; 2022–23	
Transformers: Animated	December 26, 2007	May 23, 2009	2009	(Note: Acquired by the Hub Network in 2010.)
Ben 10: Alien Force	April 18, 2008	March 26, 2010	2010–12; 2014; 2022	
The Marvelous Misadventures of Flapjack	June 5, 2008	August 31, 2010	2010–14; 2022; 2026	
The Secret Saturdays	October 3, 2008	January 30, 2010	2010	
Batman: The Brave and the Bold	November 14, 2008	November 18, 2011	N/A	
Adventure Time	April 5, 2010	September 3, 2018	2018; 2020; 2021-2022, 2023–2026	
Ben 10: Ultimate Alien	April 23, 2010	March 31, 2012	2012–13; 2014	
Generator Rex	April 23, 2010	January 3, 2013	N/A	
MAD	September 6, 2010	December 2, 2013	2013–14	
Sym-Bionic Titan	September 17, 2010	April 9, 2011	N/A	
Robotomy	October 25, 2010	January 24, 2011	2013	
Young Justice	November 26, 2010	March 16, 2013	N/A	(Note: After renewal it was moved to DC Universe and, for later seasons, HBO Max.)
The Problem Solverz	April 4, 2011	September 29, 2011	2011; 2013	
ThunderCats (2011)	July 29, 2011	June 16, 2012	N/A	
Secret Mountain Fort Awesome	August 1, 2011	February 17, 2012	2012; 2013	
Green Lantern: The Animated Series	November 11, 2011	March 16, 2013	N/A	
Ben 10: Omniverse	August 1, 2012	November 14, 2014	2014	
Beware the Batman	July 13, 2013	October 5, 2013	N/A	(Note: After a hiatus, the remaining episodes were burnt-off on Adult Swim's Toonami block in 2014.)
Mixels	February 12, 2014	October 1, 2016	N/A	
Clarence	April 14, 2014	June 24, 2018	2022; 2023–25	
We Bare Bears	July 27, 2015	May 27, 2019	2019–2021; 2022–2025; 2026	
The Powerpuff Girls (2016)	April 4, 2016	June 16, 2019	2019; 2022	
Mighty Magiswords	September 29, 2016	May 17, 2019	N/A	
Justice League Action	December 16, 2016	June 3, 2018		
Ben 10 (2017)	April 10, 2017	April 11, 2021	2024	
OK K.O.! Let's Be Heroes	August 1, 2017	September 6, 2019	September 7, 2019	
Unikitty!	October 27, 2017	August 27, 2020	N/A	
Apple & Onion	February 23, 2018	December 7, 2021	2021–22; 2023–25	
Craig of the Creek	March 30, 2018	January 25, 2025	2025; 2026	
Summer Camp Island	July 7, 2018	August 11, 2023	2023–24; 2026	(Note: Series moved to HBO Max for seasons 2–5, but returned to Cartoon Network for its sixth and final season.)
DC Super Hero Girls	March 8, 2019	October 24, 2021	N/A	
Victor and Valentino	March 30, 2019	August 26, 2022	2022	
Mao Mao: Heroes of Pure Heart	July 1, 2019	July 17, 2020	2020	
Infinity Train	August 5, 2019	January 10, 2020	2020	(Note: Moved to HBO Max.)
Steven Universe Future	December 7, 2019	March 27, 2020	N/A	
ThunderCats Roar	February 22, 2020	December 5, 2020	2022	
Tig n' Seek	July 23, 2020 (HBO Max); August 6, 2021 (Cartoon Network)	May 26, 2022 (HBO Max); October 15, 2021 (Cartoon Network)	2022	
The Fungies!	August 20, 2020 (HBO Max); June 4, 2021 (Cartoon Network)	December 16, 2021 (HBO Max); September 3, 2021 (Cartoon Network)	2022	
Elliott from Earth	March 29, 2021	April 9, 2021	2022	

==== Live-action and live-action/animated series ====
Title	Premiere date	Finale date	Date(s) rerun	Note(s)
Out of Jimmy's Head	September 14, 2007	May 29, 2008	2008	(Note: Live action-animation hybrid)
The Othersiders	June 17, 2009	October 30, 2009	2009	
BrainRush	June 20, 2009	July 22, 2009	2009–10	(Note: Live action genre)
Destroy Build Destroy	June 20, 2009	September 17, 2011	2011–12	(Note: Live action genre)
Bobb'e Says	August 19, 2009	September 23, 2009	N/A	(Note: Live action genre)
Dude, What Would Happen	August 19, 2009	September 21, 2011	2011; 2013	(Note: Live action genre)
Tower Prep	October 16, 2010	December 28, 2010	N/A	(Note: Live action genre)
Level Up	January 24, 2012	February 19, 2013	2013	(Note: Live action genre)
Incredible Crew	December 31, 2012	April 11, 2013	2013–14	(Note: Live action genre)

==== Preschool ====
Title	Premiere date	Finale date	Date(s) rerun	Note(s)
Big Bag	June 2, 1996	May 31, 1998	1998–2001	
Baby Looney Tunes	September 23, 2002	April 20, 2005	2005–09; 2015–16; 2021–23	(Note: Rebranded as a Cartoonito original programming globally since 2006) (Note: Available on HBO Max under the Cartoonito hub since September 13, 2021.)
Krypto the Superdog	March 25, 2005	December 15, 2006	2006–10	(Note: Rebranded as a Cartoonito original programming globally since 2006)
Firehouse Tales	August 22, 2005	May 7, 2006	—N/a	(Note: Originally aired on Cartoon Network's Tickle-U block; rebranded as a Cartoonito original programming globally since 2006)
Jessica's Big Little World	September 20, 2023	May 31, 2024	2024–25	(Note: Also aired during the regular Cartoon Network schedule.)
Barney's World	October 18, 2024	December 12, 2025	2025–26	(Note: Removed from the schedule; currently still airs on Discovery Family and Boomerang.)

==== Miniseries ====
Title	Premiere date	Finale date	Date(s) rerun
Over the Garden Wall	November 3, 2014	November 7, 2014	2014; 2016–17; 2022; 2023; 2024–25; 2026
Adventure Time: Stakes	November 16, 2015	November 19, 2015	2016; 2018
Long Live the Royals	November 30, 2015	December 3, 2015	N/A
Adventure Time: Islands	January 30, 2017	February 2, 2017	2018
Adventure Time: Elements	April 24, 2017	April 27, 2017	2018
Clarence's Stormy Sleepover	June 5, 2017		2017–18
Aquaman: King of Atlantis	May 14, 2022		—N/a

==== Short series ====
Title	Premiere date	Finale date
Ben 10 shorts	July 14, 2007	March 12, 2012
Billy's Birthday Shorties	July 14, 2007	March 12, 2012
Camp Lazlo shorts	November 9, 2006	January 7, 2008
DC Nation Shorts	November 11, 2011	August 2, 2014
Foster's Home for Imaginary Friends shorts	June 9, 2006	August 7, 2007
Get 'Em Tommy!	December 19, 2016	December 24, 2016
The Grim Adventures of Billy & Mandy shorts	October 23, 2006	October 26, 2006
Irwin Hearts Mandy	February 14, 2007	
La'Antz and Derek	June 22, 2010	April 6, 2011
The Life and Times of Juniper Lee shorts	December 28, 2006	May 14, 2007
My Gym Partner's a Monkey shorts	December 28, 2006	May 14, 2007
OK K.O.! Let's Be Heroes	September 6, 2006	February 22, 2008
Rad Roach	September 4, 2010	
Squirrel Boy shorts	January 11, 2008	April 10, 2008
The Swashbuckling Perils of the Adventures of the Men & Jeremy	July 19, 2010	January 6, 2011
Teddy Blue Eyes	October 19, 2010	October 26, 2010
Track Rats	June 14, 2010	December 15, 2010

=== Programming from Hanna-Barbera/Turner Entertainment ===
Title	Started	Ended	Note(s)
2 Stupid Dogs / Super Secret Secret Squirrel	1994	2011	
The 13 Ghosts of Scooby-Doo	1994	February 16, 2026	
The Addams Family (1992)	1996	2000	
The Adventures of Don Coyote and Sancho Panda	1994	1999	
The Adventures of Gulliver	2002	2003	
Alvin and the Chipmunks	1998	2002	
The Amazing Chan and the Chan Clan	1994	1997	
The Amazing Chan and the Chan Clan	2000	2004	
Arabian Knights	1992	2004	
The Atom Ant/Secret Squirrel Show	1992	2004	
Augie Doggie and Doggie Daddy	1993	2004	
Back to Bedrock: Captain Caveman and the Teen Angels; The Flintstone Comedy Hour; The Flintstone Comedy Show; The New Fred and Barney Show	1992	1996	
Back to Bedrock: Captain Caveman and the Teen Angels; The Flintstone Comedy Hour; The Flintstone Comedy Show; The New Fred and Barney Show	1998	1998	
Back to Bedrock: Captain Caveman and the Teen Angels; The Flintstone Comedy Hour; The Flintstone Comedy Show; The New Fred and Barney Show	2000	2000	
The Banana Splits	September 20, 1993	2000	
Barney Bear	1992	2003	
Birdman and the Galaxy Trio	1992	2004	
Breezly and Sneezly	1992	2004	
Buford and the Galloping Ghost	1994	1997	
Buford and the Galloping Ghost	December 14, 2002		
Buford and the Galloping Ghost	May 31, 2003		
Butch Cassidy and the Sundance Kids	1995	1996	
Butch Cassidy and the Sundance Kids	1998	2004	
Capitol Critters		2004	
The Captain and the Kids	1992	2004	
Captain Planet and the Planeteers	1995	2005	
Casper and the Angels	1995	1997	
Casper and the Angels	July 27, 2002	July 27, 2002	
Casper and the Angels	August 16, 2003	August 16, 2003	
Cattanooga Cats	1992	2004	
Cartoon Roulette	1997	2000	
CB Bears	1995	1996	
CB Bears	2003	2004	
Centurions	1993	1997	
Clue Club	1994	1997	
Clue Club	2000	2004	
The Completely Mental Misadventures of Ed Grimley	1992	1997	
Dastardly and Muttley in Their Flying Machines	1992	2004	
Devlin	1992	2004	
Dingbat	1994	1995	
Dingbat	2002	2004	
Dink, the Little Dinosaur	1992	1997	
Droopy	1992	2004	
Droopy, Master Detective	1997	2001	
Dynomutt, Dog Wonder	1992	2000	
Fangface	1994	1995	
Fangface	1997	2000	
Fangface	2002	2004	
The Fantastic Four	1992	2004	
Fantastic Max	1993	1999	
The Flintstone Kids	1994	1998	
The Flintstone Kids	2001	2003	
The Flintstones	1992	December 14, 2024	
Frankenstein Jr. and The Impossibles	1992	2004	
The Funky Phantom	1994	2004	
G-Force: Guardians of Space	January 2, 1995	2004	
Galaxy Goof-Ups	1993	2000	
Galtar and the Golden Lance	1992	1995	
The Gary Coleman Show	1997	1999	
George and Junior	1992	2004	
Goober and the Ghost Chasers	2002	2004	
The Great Grape Ape Show	2001	May 23, 2004	
Gumby	1998	2001	
Heathcliff	1994	1995	
Heathcliff	2002	2004	
Help!... It's the Hair Bear Bunch!	1994	2004	
The Herculoids	1992	2004	
The Hillbilly Bears	1992	2004	
Hokey Wolf	1992	2004	
Hong Kong Phooey	1994	2004	
The Huckleberry Hound Show	1992	2004	
Inch High, Private Eye	1992	1999	
Jabberjaw	1994	2004	
The Jetsons	1992	2012	
Jonny Quest	1992	2004	
Josie and the Pussycats	1993	2004	
Josie and the Pussycats in Outer Space	1993	2003	
Karate Kommandos	1993	1998	
The Kwicky Koala Show	1993	1993	
The Kwicky Koala Show	2002	2003	
Late Night Black & White	June 1, 1993	2003	
Lippy the Lion and Hardy Har Har	1992	2004	
Loopy De Loop	1992	2004	
Magilla Gorilla	October 1, 1992	2004	
Marmaduke	1994	1995	
Mighty Man and Yukk	1994	1996	
Mighty Man and Yukk	November 23, 2002	November 23, 2002	
Mighty Man and Yukk	2003	2003	
Mister T	1994	1997	
Moby Dick and Mighty Mightor	1992	2004	
The New Shmoo	2002	2003	
The New Shmoo	June 6, 2004	June 6, 2004	
The New Yogi Bear Show	1993	2003	
Pac-Man	1995	1995	
Pac-Man	2002	2003	
Paw Paws	1992	1998	
The Pebbles and Bamm-Bamm Show	1994	1996	
The Pebbles and Bamm-Bamm Show	1998	2004	
The Perils of Penelope Pitstop	1992	2004	
Peter Potamus	1992	2004	
The Pirates of Dark Water	1993	2000	
The Pirates of Dark Water	2003	2003	
Pixie and Dixie and Mr. Jinks	1992	2004	
Plastic Man	1992	1995	
Popeye	1992	2004	
Pound Puppies	1993	1999	
Precious Pupp	1992	2004	
Punkin' Puss & Mushmouse	1992	2004	
A Pup Named Scooby-Doo	October 4, 1993	February 16, 2026	
The Quick Draw McGraw Show	1992	2004	
Richie Rich	1994	1998	
Richie Rich	2002	2003	
Ricochet Rabbit & Droop-a-Long	1992	2004	
The Roman Holidays	1995	1996	
The Roman Holidays	2000	2004	
The Ruff and Reddy Show	2001	2003	
Scooby's All-Star Laff-A-Lympics	1994	2000	
Screwy Squirrel	1992	2003	
Sealab 2020	1998	2004	
Secret Squirrel	1992	2004	
Shazzan	1992	2004	
Shirt Tales	1992	2003	
SilverHawks	2000	2001	
The Skatebirds	1995	1995	
The Skatebirds	May 22, 2004	May 22, 2004	
Sky Commanders	1995	1997	
The Smurfs	October 4, 1993	February 2, 2014	
Snagglepuss	1992	February 2, 2014	
Snooper and Blabber	1993	February 2, 2014	
Snorks	1992	1999	
Space Ghost / Dino Boy	1992	2004	
The Space Kidettes	1993	1998	
Space Stars	1992	2004	
Speed Buggy	1995	2004	
Squiddly Diddly	1992	2000	
Super Friends	1996	2003	
The Super Globetrotters	1994	2004	
SWAT Kats: The Radical Squadron	1994	2001	
SWAT Kats: The Radical Squadron	2006	2006	
These Are the Days	1994	2000	
Thundarr the Barbarian	1992	1998	
Thundarr the Barbarian	2003	2003	
Thundarr the Barbarian	June 12, 2004	June 12, 2004	
ThunderCats	March 17, 1997	2001	
ThunderCats	July 23, 2011	July 24, 2011	
Timeless Tales	1993	1996	
Trollkins	1993	1994	
Trollkins	January 4, 2003	January 4, 2003	
Tom and Jerry	1992	June 4, 2025	
Tom & Jerry Kids	1995	June 4, 2025	
The Tom and Jerry Comedy Show	1992	2004	
The Tom and Jerry Show (1975)	1992	August 30, 2025	
Top Cat	1992	2004	
Touché Turtle and Dum Dum	1992	2004	
Valley of the Dinosaurs	1993	1995	
Valley of the Dinosaurs	1997	1997	
Valley of the Dinosaurs	2000	2004	
Wacky Races (1968)	1992	2004	
Wait Till Your Father Gets Home	1992	2000	
Wally Gator	1992	2004	
Wheelie and the Chopper Bunch	1992	2004	
Where's Huddles?	1995	1996	
Where's Huddles?	2000	2002	
Wildfire	1995		
Winsome Witch	1992	2004	
Yakky Doodle	1992	2004	
Yippee, Yappee and Yahooey	1992	2004	
Yogi Bear	1993	September 23, 2023	
Yogi's Gang	1993	2004	
Yogi's Space Race	1993	2004	
Yogi's Treasure Hunt	1993	1999	
Young Samson	1993	2004	

=== Programming from Warner Bros. Animation ===
Title	Started	Ended	Note(s)
Animaniacs	1997	1997	(Note: Acquired by Nickelodeon.)
Animaniacs	August 1998	2001	(Note: Acquired by Nickelodeon.)
Batman: The Animated Series	March 2, 1998	2004	
Batman Beyond	October 1, 2001	2005	
The Batman***	April 2, 2005	2006	
The Bugs & Daffy Show	1997	2003	
Bugs & Daffy Tonight	1992	1995	
Bunnicula	February 6, 2016	March 12, 2016	
Dorothy and the Wizard of Oz	December 21, 2018		
Freakazoid!	April 5, 1997	2003	
Looney Tunes	October 1, 1992	April 1, 2026	
Looney Tunes Cartoons	July 5, 2021	September 2, 2023	
The Looney Tunes Show (2001)	March 21, 2001	2004	
¡Mucha Lucha!	2004	2009	
The New Batman Adventures	2001	2004	
The New Batman/Superman Adventures	1998	2000	
Ozzy & Drix	2004	2006	
Road Rovers	February 7, 1998	2000	
Static Shock	2004	2006	(Note: Acquired by Disney XD.)
Superman (1940s)	1997	2000	
Superman (1940s)	2002	2002	
Superman: The Animated Series	1997	1997	
Superman: The Animated Series	2000	2004	
Sylvester and Tweety Mysteries	2002	December 17, 2023	
Taz-Mania	1996	1999	
Tiny Toon Adventures	1999	2001	
Wacky Races (2017)*	August 13, 2018		
Waynehead	1998	2000	
Xiaolin Showdown	2006	2007	

=== Programming from Adult Swim ===
Title	Year(s) aired	Note(s)
Adult Swim Smalls	2023	(Note: Aired during ACME Night.)
Infomercials	2023	(Note: Aired during ACME Night.)
Joe Pera Talks with You	2023	(Note: Aired during ACME Night.)
My Adventures with Superman	2023	(Note: Aired during ACME Night.)
Unicorn: Warriors Eternal	2023	(Note: Aired during ACME Night.)

=== Acquired programming ===
==== Co-productions ====
Title	Year(s) aired	Note(s)
Star Wars: Clone Wars	2003–05	
The Cramp Twins	2004–05	
Code Lyoko	2004–08	
Robotboy	2005–09	
Fantastic Four: World's Greatest Heroes	2006–07	
Storm Hawks	2007–08	
George of the Jungle (2007)	2007–10	
The Mr. Men Show	2008–09	
Chop Socky Chooks	2008–10	
Total Drama	2008–14; 2018–19; 2024–25	
Hot Wheels Battle Force 5	2009–11	
Casper's Scare School	2009–13	
The Garfield Show	2009–14	
Hero: 108	2010–13	
Ninjago	2011–20	
Sonic Boom	2014–16	
Cloudy with a Chance of Meatballs	2017	
Mega Man: Fully Charged	2018–19	
Power Players	2019–20	

==== Animated ====
Title	Distributor	Started	Ended	Note(s)
6teen	Nelvana	2008	2011	
The Adventures of Rocky and Bullwinkle and Friends	The Program Exchange	1996	2003	
Almost Naked Animals	9 Story Media Group	2011	2013	
The Amazing Spiez!	Banijay Rights	2010	2010	
Atomic Betty	Breakthrough Distribution; Distribution360	2004	2005	
Beast Wars: Transformers	Claster Television	1998	1998	
Beetlejuice	Nelvana	1998	2000	
Betty Boop	King Features Entertainment	1993	2003	
Bob's Burgers	20th Television	2021	2023	
Care Bears: Unlock the Magic	Cloudco Entertainment	2019	2019	
Chaotic	4Kids Entertainment	2009	2010	
Chaotic: M'arillian Invasion	4Kids Entertainment	2009	2010	
Chaotic: Secrets of the Lost City	4Kids Entertainment	2009	2010	
Dennis the Menace	The Program Exchange	2001	2014	
Dragons	DreamWorks Animation	2012	2014	
Dragon Hunters	Futurikon	2006	2006	
Dudley Do-Right	The Program Exchange	1999	2001	
Ellen's Acres	Cake Distribution	2006	2007	
The Fantastic Voyages of Sinbad the Sailor	Warner Bros. Television	February 2, 1998	2002	
Futurama	20th Television	2023	2023	
Garfield and Friends	9 Story Media Group; The Program Exchange	1995	1997	
Godzilla	Turner Program Services; Classic Media	1993	2003	
Gordon the Garden Gnome	Southern Star Entertainment	2005	2006	
George of the Jungle (1967)	Worldvision Enterprises	1995	1997	
Gerald McBoing-Boing	Classic Media	2005	2006	
G.I. Joe: A Real American Hero	TV-Loonland AG	2002	2003	
Gormiti	Marathon Media	2009	2010	
Grojband	FremantleMedia	2013	2013	
Harry and His Bucket Full of Dinosaurs	CCI Releasing	2005	2007	
He-Man and the Masters of the Universe	Mike Young Productions	2002	2004	
Hot Wheels: AcceleRacers	Rainmaker Entertainment	2005	2005	
Jackie Chan Adventures	Sony Pictures Television	2003	2005	(Note: Acquired by Jetix.)
James Bond Jr.	MGM Television	1995	1996	
Johnny Test	WildBrain	2008	2014	
Lamput	Vaibhav Studios	2022	2022	
The Land Before Time	Universal Television	2007	2008	
League of Super Evil	WildBrain	2009	2011	
Legends of Chima	The LEGO Group	2013	2014	
Little Robots	Create Media Ventures	2005	2006	
Max Steel	Sony Pictures Television	2001	2004	
MetaJets	DHX Media	2010	2010	
Midnight Patrol: Adventures in the Dream Zone	Worldvision Enterprises	1995	1997	
My Knight and Me	Cake Entertainment	2017	2017	
Nexo Knights	The LEGO Group	2015	2017	
Nudnik	Rembrandt Films	1996	1996	
Peanuts	Peanuts Worldwide	2016	2016	
Pecola	Nelvana	2003	2004	
Peppa Pig	Contender Entertainment Group	2005	2007	
Pet Alien	Taffy Entertainment	2005	2006	
Pingu	HiT Entertainment	1995		
Pink Panther and Pals	MGM Television	2010	2010	
The Pink Panther Show	MGM Television	1997	1999	
The Pink Panther Show	MGM Television	2006	2006	
Princess Natasha	FremantleMedia	2004	2007	
Roger Ramjet	Image Entertainment	1996	2001	
ReBoot	Rainmaker Entertainment	1999	2001	
Redakai: Conquer the Kairu	Zodiak Media	2011	2013	
Rescue Heroes	Nelvana	2004	2004	
Robotech	Harmony Gold	1998	2003	
Scaredy Squirrel	Nelvana	2011	2014	
Shaun the Sheep	Aardman Animations	2015	2015	
Sidekick	Nelvana	2011	2012	
Sitting Ducks	Universal Television	2003	2004	
Skunk Fu!	Cake Entertainment	2008	2009	
Star Wars: The Clone Wars	Lucasfilm	2008	2013	
Stoked	Cake Entertainment	2009	2010	
The Super Hero Squad Show	Marvel Entertainment	2009	2012	
Supernoobs	DHX Media	2015	2016	
Team Galaxy	Marathon Media	2006	2007	
Teenage Mutant Ninja Turtles	4Kids Entertainment	2004	2007	(Note: Intellectual property now owned by Nickelodeon, which produced new episodes.)
Total Drama Presents: The Ridonculous Race	Cake Entertainment	2015	2015	
Total DramaRama	Cake Entertainment	2018	2026	
Totally Spies!	Zodiak Kids & Family France	2003	2026	(Note: Original run from July 7, 2003 to June 1, 2010, rerunning through September 10, 2010.)
Transformers: Cyberverse	Allspark Animation	2018	2020	
Transformers: Robots in Disguise	Hasbro Studios	2015	2017	
Underdog	The Program Exchange	1996	1999	
Voltron	World Events Productions	1997	2000	
Winx Club	4Kids Entertainment/Rainbow S.r.l.	2005	2008	
The Woody Woodpecker Show	Universal Television	1997	1998	
Wulin Warriors	Broadway Video	2006	2006	
X-Men: Evolution	Marvel Entertainment	2003	2004	
Yoko! Jakamoko! Toto!	Collingwood O'Hare	2005	2006	
Young Robin Hood	Cinar	1994	1999	

==== Anime ====
Title	Distributor	Started	Ended	Note(s)
.hack//Sign	Bandai Entertainment	2003	2004	
.hack//Legend of the Twilight	Bandai Entertainment	2004	2006	
.hack//Roots	Bandai Entertainment	2006	2007	
Astro Boy	Sony Pictures Television	2004	2004	
Bakugan: Armored Alliance	Nelvana	2020	2021	
Bakugan Battle Brawlers	Nelvana	2008	2012	
Bakugan Battle Brawlers: New Vestroia	Nelvana	2009	2012	
Bakugan: Battle Planet	Nelvana	2018	2021	
Bakugan: Gundalian Invaders	Nelvana	2010	2012	
Bakugan: Mechtanium Surge	Nelvana	2011	2012	
Beyblade: Metal Fusion	Nelvana	2010	2012	
Beyblade: Metal Masters	Nelvana	2011	2013	
Beyblade: Metal Fury	Nelvana	2012	2014	
Beyblade: Shogun Steel	Nelvana	2013	2014	
BeyWarriors: BeyRaiderz	Nelvana	2014	2014	
BeyWheelz	Nelvana	2012	2012	
The Big O	Bandai Entertainment	2001	2002	
Blue Dragon	Viz Media	2008	2008	
Bobobo-bo Bo-bobo	Toei Animation	2005	2007	
Cardcaptors	Nelvana	2001	2001	
Cyborg 009	Sony Pictures Family Entertainment Group (Sony Pictures Television)	2003	2004	
Dai-Guard	Discotek Media	2003	2003	
D.I.C.E.	Bandai Entertainment	2005	2005	
Dragon Ball	Crunchyroll	2001	2004	
Dragon Ball GT	Crunchyroll	2003	2005	
Dragon Ball Z	Crunchyroll	1998	2008	
Duel Masters	Hasbro Entertainment	2004	2006	
Gigantor	Public domain	2003	2003	
Hamtaro	Viz Media	2002	2004	
Idaten Jump	Hasbro	2006	2007	
Immortal Grand Prix (IGPX)	Bandai Entertainment	2005	2006	
Knights of the Zodiac	DIC Entertainment; The Program Exchange	2003	2004	
MÄR	Viz Media	2006	2007	
Martian Successor Nadesico	Right Stuf Inc.	2003	2003	
MegaMan NT Warrior	Viz Media	2004	2004	
Mega Man Star Force	Viz Media	2007	2007	
Mobile Fighter G Gundam	Bandai Entertainment	2002	2003	
Mobile Suit Gundam	Bandai Entertainment	2001	2002	
Mobile Suit Gundam 0080: War in the Pocket	Bandai Entertainment	2001	2001	
Mobile Suit Gundam SEED	Bandai Entertainment	2004	2005	
Mobile Suit Gundam: The 08th MS Team	Bandai Entertainment	2001	2001	
Mobile Suit Gundam Wing	Bandai Entertainment	2000	2002	
Naruto	Viz Media	2005	2009	
Neon Genesis Evangelion	GKIDS	2003	2003	
One Piece	4Kids Entertainment/Crunchyroll	2005	2008	
Outlaw Star	Bandai Entertainment	2001	2002	
Pokémon	4Kids Entertainment; The Pokémon Company International	2002	2017	
Pokémon Chronicles	The Pokémon Company	2006	2007	
The Prince of Tennis	Viz Media	2006	2007	
Rave Master	Tokyopop	2004	2005	
Ronin Warriors	Cinar	1999	2001	
Rurouni Kenshin	Media Blasters	2003	2005	
Sailor Moon	DIC Entertainment; The Program Exchange; Cloverway	1998	2001	
Scan2Go	DHX Media	2012	2014	
Shaman King	4Kids Entertainment	2004	2004	
Speed Racer	Speed Racer Enterprises	1996	1999	
Superior Defender Gundam Force	Bandai Entertainment	2003	2005	
Tenchi in Tokyo	Geneon USA	2000	2002	
Tenchi Muyo!	Geneon USA	2000	2002	
Tenchi Universe	Geneon USA	2000	2002	
Tenkai Knights	Spin Master	2013	2014	
Transformers: Armada	Hasbro	2002	2004	
Transformers: Energon	Hasbro	2004	2005	
Transformers: Cybertron	Hasbro	2005	2008	
Yu-Gi-Oh!	4Kids Entertainment	2002	2005	
Yu-Gi-Oh! GX	4Kids Entertainment	2005	2008	
Yu-Gi-Oh! 5D's	4Kids Entertainment	2009	2010	
YuYu Hakusho	Crunchyroll	2003	2006	
Zatch Bell!	Viz Media	2005	2007	
Zixx	Nelvana	2005	2006	
Zoids: Chaotic Century	Viz Media	2002	2004	
Zoids: Guardian Force	Viz Media	2002	2004	
Zoids: New Century Zero	Viz Media	2002	2004	
Zoids: Fuzors	Hasbro	2003	2004	

==== Live-action and live-action/animated series ====
Title	Distributor	Year(s) aired	Note(s)
10 Count	Warner Bros. Television	2009	
The Carbonaro Effect	Warner Bros. Television	2021	
The Cube	All3Media America	2021	
Family Matters	Warner Bros. Television	2021	
Goosebumps	Scholastic Entertainment	2007–09	
Harry Potter: Hogwarts Tournament of Houses	Warner Bros. Television	2021	(Note: Premiered concurrently on TBS.)
The High Fructose Adventures of Annoying Orange	Studio71 (formerly The Collective)	2012–14	
Hole in the Wall	FremantleMedia	2010–13	
My Dad's a Pro	Warner Bros. Television	2010–11	
Re:Evolution of Sports	Warner Bros. Television	2009	
Run It Back	Warner Bros. Television	2010–11	
SlamBall	MTV Networks	2009	
Thumb Wrestling Federation	FremantleMedia	2008–09	
Unnatural History	Warner Bros. Television	2010	
Wipeout	Banijay Rights	2021–22	

==== Preschool (Cartoonito) ====
Title	First aired	Last aired	Note(s)
Bing	September 13, 2021	June 27, 2022	
Caillou	September 13, 2021	May 4, 2022	
Mush-Mush & the Mushables	September 13, 2021	June 23, 2022	
Pocoyo	September 13, 2021	September 23, 2022	
Thomas & Friends: All Engines Go	September 13, 2021	December 15, 2023	
Esme & Roy	September 18, 2021	March 25, 2022	
Lucas the Spider	September 18, 2021	April 5, 2024	
Care Bears: Unlock the Magic	September 19, 2021	October 21, 2024	
Love Monster	September 19, 2021	May 6, 2022	
The Not-Too-Late Show with Elmo	January 28, 2022	March 25, 2022	
Cocomelon	January 31, 2022	February 16, 2024	
Mecha Builders	April 30, 2022	November 24, 2023	
Blippi Wonders	June 6, 2022	December 23, 2022	
Lellobee City Farm	June 6, 2022	December 23, 2022	
Lu & the Bally Bunch	October 1, 2024	May 23, 2025	
Silly Sundays	October 2, 2024	May 23, 2025	
Let's Go, Bananas!	October 3, 2024	May 23, 2025	

=== Specials ===
Title	Year(s) aired	Note(s)
The 1st 13th Annual Fancy Anvil Awards Show Program Special: Live! in Stereo	March 23, 2002	
Adventure Time Forever	2015	
Big Game XXVI: Tom vs. Jerry	January 24, 1998	
Big Game XXVII: Sylvester vs. Tweety	January 30, 1999	
Big Game XXVIII: Road Runner vs. Coyote	January 29, 2000	
Big Game XIXIX: Bugs vs. Daffy	January 27, 2001	
The Big Pick	August 25–27, 2000	
The Big Pick II	August 24–26, 2001	
Brak Presents the Brak Show Starring Brak	February 20, 2000	
The Bully Effect	2013	
Cartoon Network's 20th Birthday	October 1, 2012	
Cartoon Network: Big Fan Weekend	2011	
Cartoon Network's Funniest Bloopers and Other Embarrassing Moments	June 6, 2003	
Cartoon Network's Golden Betty Awards	1995	
Cartoon Network's Greatest Musical Moments	2003	
Cartoon Summer Kick-Off Special	2005–06	
Contest	2013	
Droopy's Guide to the Cartoon Network	October 1, 1992	
Good Jubies	2016	
Hall of Game Awards	February 25, 2011 – February 17, 2014	
Night of the Living Doo	October 31, 2001	
Props	2007	
The Scooby-Doo Project	1999	
Sesame Street: Elmo's Playdate	April 14, 2020	
Stop Bullying: Speak Up	2012	

== Programming blocks ==
=== Current programming blocks ===
Title	Premiere date	Source(s)
Adult Swim	September 2, 2001	(Note: Also considered to be its own network since 2005. Currently shares channel space with Cartoon Network.)
Checkered Past	August 28, 2023 – June 27, 2025; December 29, 2025	(Note: While the block aired on Adult Swim, the block was also promoted and mentioned on Cartoon Network's social media pages.)
Toonami	March 17, 1997 – September 20, 2008; May 26, 2012	(Note: Current iteration of the block airs on Adult Swim.)

=== Former programming blocks ===
Title	Year(s) aired	Note(s)
2-in-a-Row	1992–95	
2-of-a-Kind	1992–95	
5, 6, 7 Go	2018–19	
5, 6, 7, 8	2018	
70's Super Explosion	1995–1996	
Acme Hour	1997–2003	
ACME Night	2021–24	(Note: Block moved to Adult Swim on September 3, 2023.)
Acme Radio Hour	1995–97	
Action Flicks	2008–09	
Afternoon Adventures	1995–97	
All-Star Naughty List	2007	
The Best Sunday Night on Television	1995–96	
Ben 10 Alien of the Week	2017	
Big Hullabanew	2007	
Big Wednesday	1996–97	
Boomerang (block)	1992–2004	
Camp Cartoon Cartoon/Camp Cartoon	2003–04	
Carrot Top's A.M. Mayhem	1995	
Cartoon-a-Doodle-Doo	1997–2000	
Cartoon Cartoon Fridays	1999–2003	
Cartoon Cartoon Fridays Big Pick Weekend	2001	
Cartoon Cartoon of the Day	1999–2000	
Cartoon Cartoon Weekend	1997–2002	
Cartoon Cartoon Weekend Summerfest	2002	
Cartoon Cartoon Summer	1999–2001	
The Cartoon Cartoon Show	2000–03; 2005–08	
Cartoon Cartoon Top 5/Top 5	2002–08	
Cartoon Network Gone MAD	2011	
Cartoon Network's Holiday Rush	2005–07	
Cartoon Network Invaded	2007	
Cartoon Olio	2001–02	
Cartoon Planet	1995–99; 2012–14	
Cartoon Summer	2005–06	
Cartoon Theatre	1998–2007	
Cartoonito	2021–25	
The Christmas Party	1997–2003	
Clarence's Summer Splash	2015	
CN Real	2009–10	
CN Sports	2009	
CN Thursday Nights	2008	
DC Nation	2012–14	
Double Vision	1993–96	
Dynamite Action Squad	2007–09	(Note: Secondary block of Fried Dynamite.)
Flicks	2008–14	
Friday Night Premiere Thunder	2007	(Note: Successor to Fridays.)
Fridays	2003–07	
Fried Dynamite	2007–08	
Funny for Your Face	2007–08	
The Grim and Courage Hour	2006	
Har Har Tharsdays	2008–10	
High Noon Toons	1994–95	
JBVO	2000–01	
Johnny Johnny	2009	
Last Bell	2003–04	
Lumpus and Slinkman's Cabin Fever	2005	
Master Control	2007	
Miguzi	2004–07	
The Morning Crew	1992–97	
March Movie Madness	2007	
Movie Madness	2007–08	
Mr. Spim's Cartoon Theatre	1995–97	
Mysteries Inc.	1997–2000	
New @ 6	2015	
New @ 7	2013	
NEW NEW NEW NEW	2017–18	
New Thursday	2014–16	
The New Thursday Nights	2008	
Power Zone	1995–97	
Primetime	2001–04	
Cartoon Cartoon Primetime	2001	
Regular Time Adventure Show	2016	
The Saturday Block Party	2004–05	
Saturday Crush Zone	2009	
Saturday Japanime	1995	
Saturday Video Entertainment System (SVES)	2003–04	
Scaretoon Scaretoon Fright-Days	2002	
Scooby Alley	2004–05	
Scooby Universe	2002–04	
Shocktober	2003	
Small World	1996–2002	
Sneak Ends	2014	
Summertime Go!	2017	
Summer @ Seven	2007	
Summer Fridays/Cartoon Network's Fridays	2003	
Sunday Afternoon Mysteries	1995–97	
Super Adventures	1992–96	
Super Chunk	1994–2000; 2009	
Thumbtastic After School Event	2008	
Teen Titans Go!: Top 5	2015–16	
Tickle-U	2005–06	
Toonami Midnight Run	1999–2003	
Toonami Rising Sun	2000–03	
Toonami Super Saturday	2001–03	
Toonapalooza	1995–96	
Toon Extra/Cartoon Network Extra	1997–2004; 2007–10	
Top 20	2004	(Note: Summer version of Top 5.)
Total Drama Tuesdays	2009	
Totally Atomic	2005	
You Are Here	2008–10	
Weekend Top 5	2014–15	

== Pilots ==
=== Short format ===
This is a list of pilot episodes on Cartoon Network, along with their premiere dates for each.

==== Picked up ====
Title	Episode(s)	Premiere date(s)	Note(s)
Space Ghost Coast to Coast	—N/a	1993	
The Powerpuff Girls	"Meat Fuzzy Lumkins"	February 20, 1995	(Note: Aired as part of What a Cartoon!.)
Dexter's Laboratory	N/A	February 26, 1995	(Note: Aired as part of What a Cartoon!.)
Johnny Bravo	N/A	March 26, 1995	(Note: Aired as part of What a Cartoon!.)
Cow and Chicken	"No Smoking"	November 12, 1995	(Note: Aired as part of What a Cartoon!.)
Courage the Cowardly Dog	"The Chicken from Outer Space"	February 18, 1996	(Note: Aired as part of What a Cartoon!.)
Mike, Lu & Og	"Crash Lancelot"	November 7, 1998	
The Grim Adventures of Billy & Mandy	"Meet the Reaper"	June 9, 2000	(Note: Aired as part of the network's The Big Pick marathon.)
Whatever Happened to... Robot Jones?	—N/a	June 16, 2000	(Note: Aired as part of the network's The Big Pick marathon.)
Sheep in the Big City	"In the Baa-ginning"	August 18, 2000	(Note: Aired as part of the network's The Big Pick marathon.)
The Brak Show	"Mr. Bawk Ba Gawk"	December 21, 2000	(Note: Unannounced "stealth" premiere)
Sealab 2021	"Radio Free Sealab"	December 21, 2000	(Note: Unannounced "stealth" premiere)
Aqua Teen Hunger Force	"Rabbot"	December 30, 2000	(Note: Unannounced "stealth" premiere)
Harvey Birdman, Attorney at Law	"Bannon Custody Battle"	December 30, 2000	(Note: Unannounced "stealth" premiere)
Codename: Kids Next Door	"No P in the OOL"	July 21, 2001	(Note: Aired as part of the network's The Big Pick 2 marathon.)
Evil Con Carne	—N/a	August 24, 2001	
LowBrow	"Test Drive"	August 23, 2002	(Note: Aired as part of Cartoon Network's Cartoon Cartoon Weekend Summerfest marathon.)
Hi Hi Puffy AmiYumi	—N/a	April 22, 2003	
My Gym Partner's a Monkey	"A Troubled Lion"	2003	
Camp Lazlo!	"Monkey See, Camping Doo"	2004	
Squirrel Boy	"Kite Makes Right"	2005	
The Marvelous Misadventures of Flapjack	"Pilot"	May 7, 2007	
Gumball	"Early Reel"	2008	
Regular Show	"Regular Show"	August 14, 2009	(Note: Released as part of The Cartoonstitute on Cartoon Network Video.)
Uncle Grandpa	"Uncle Grandpa"	2008	(Note: Released as part of The Cartoonstitute on Cartoon Network Video.)
Class Clowns		November 2011	
The High Fructose Adventures of Annoying Orange	"Annoying Orange 2.0"	March 30, 2012	
OK K.O! Let's Be Heroes	"Lakewood Plaza Turbo"	May 21, 2013 (Online)	
Steven Universe	"The Time Thing"	May 21, 2013 (Online)	
Clarence	—N/a	May 21, 2013 (Online); February 17, 2014 (TV)	
Tome of the Unknown	"Harvest Melody"	September 9, 2013 (LA Shorts Fest); May 18, 2015 (Online)	
Long Live the Royals	N/A	May 16, 2014 (Online)	
We Bare Bears	N/A	November 6, 2014 (KLIK! Festival); August 25, 2015 (TV)	
Apple & Onion	N/A	June 18, 2015 (Annecy Festival); May 2, 2016 (Online); May 14, 2016 (TV)	
Summer Camp Island	N/A	March 17, 2016 (SXSW Festival); December 2, 2017 (CN App); April 25, 2018 (Online)	
Victor and Valentino	N/A	October 29, 2016	
Infinity Train	N/A	November 1, 2016 (VOD); November 2, 2016 (Online); February 11, 2017 (TV)	
The Fancies	"Fancytown"/"The Beach"/"Run Pam Run"/"Sir Tree"	July 30, 2017 (ABP Festival); May 8, 2019 (Online)	
Tiggle Winks	N/A	November 24, 2017 (CN App); January 8, 2018 (Online)	
Craig of the Creek	N/A	December 1, 2017 (CN App)	

==== Not picked up ====
Title	Episode	Premiere date	Note(s)
The Moxy & Flea Show	"Abducted"	November 9, 1995	
Kenny and the Chimp	"Diseasy Does It! or Chimp 'n' Pox"	November 6, 1998	
King Crab: Space Crustacean	—N/a	August 21, 1999	
Trevor!	"Journey to Sector 5-G"	June 23, 2000	
Nikki	N/A	June 30, 2000	
Foe Paws	N/A	July 7, 2000	
Uncle Gus	"For the Love of Monkeys"	July 14, 2000	
Lucky Lydia	"Club Lydia"	July 21, 2000	
Longhair and Doubledome	"Good Wheel Hunting"	July 28, 2000	
Lost Cat	N/A	August 4, 2000	
Prickles the Cactus	N/A	August 11, 2000	
Thrillseekers	"Putt 'n' Perish"	November 3, 2000	
Captain Sturdy	"Back in Action!"	June 8, 2001	
Yee Hah & Doo Dah	"Bronco Breakin' Boots"	June 15, 2001	
IMP, Inc.	—N/a	June 22, 2001	
My Freaky Family	"Welcome to My World"	June 29, 2001	
Major Flake	"Soggy Sale"	July 6, 2001	
Utica Cartoon	"Hotdog Champeen"	July 13, 2001	
Swaroop	"Bovine Bliss"	July 27, 2001	
Ferret and Parrot	—N/a	August 3, 2001	
Uncle Gus	"Not So Fast!"	August 10, 2001	
A Kitty Bobo Show	"Cellphones"	August 17, 2001	
Commander Cork: Space Ranger	—N/a	August 23, 2002	
Longhair and Doubledome	"Where There's Smoke... There's Bob!"	August 23, 2002	
Jeffrey Cat: Claw and Order	"All Dogs Don't Go to Heaven"	August 23, 2002	
Fungus Among Us	—N/a	August 23, 2002	
Colin Versus the World	"Mr. Lounge Lizard"	August 23, 2002	
Maktar	N/A	August 23, 2002	
Bagboy!	N/A	August 23, 2002	
Private Eye Princess	N/A	November 29, 2002	
Circus Peanut & Elephant Ears	"Lunchtime for Leo"	October 13, 2003	
My Best Fiend	—N/a	2003	
Bobots	"Bobots vs. Eructo"	2004	
Periwinkle Around the World	—N/a	2004	
Plastic Man	"Puddle Trouble"	2006	
Welcome to Wackamo	N/A	2006	
The Upstate Four	N/A	June 12, 2007	
What's Wrong with Ruth?	N/A	June 30, 2007	
Project Gilroy	N/A	August 24, 2007	
Bumble Braynes	N/A	2007	
Diggs Tailwagger: Galactic Rover	"The Landing Party"	2007	
Enter Mode 5	"Re-Enter: The Kid"	2007	
Locker 514	N/A	2007	
Siblings	N/A	2007	
Stan the Man	N/A	2007	
Wacky Races Forever	N/A	2007	
Zoot Rumpus	N/A	2007	
Little Rikke	N/A	2008	
Mask of Santo	N/A	2008	
Avery Matthews: Porch Cow	N/A	July 2009	
Spang Ho!	"Something Fishy"	July 2009	
Elliot's Zoo	N/A	2009	
The Furry Pals	N/A	2009	
Hamshanks and the Himalolly Mountain Railway	N/A	2009	
Mutant Moments	N/A	2009	
Pinky Malinky	N/A	2009	
Verne on Vacation	N/A	2009	
KROG	N/A	2010	
Attention Students	N/A	November 28, 2011	
Aliens in the House	N/A	December 8, 2011	
The ATM	N/A	2011	
Dynamice!	N/A	2011	
Harlem Man	N/A	2011	
Dog World	N/A	September 6, 2012	
Irazu	N/A	2012	
Duke Painbringer	N/A	2013	

=== Long format ===
This is a list of pilot movies on Cartoon Network, along with their status and premiere dates for each.

Title	Status	Premiere date	Note(s)
Samurai Jack: The Premiere Movie	Successful	August 10, 2001	
Party Wagon	Failed	February 27, 2004	
House of Bloo's	Successful	August 13, 2004	
Home	Successful	November 3, 2006	
Re-Animated	Successful	December 8, 2006	
Transform and Roll Out	Successful	December 26, 2007	
Underfist: Halloween Bash	Failed	October 12, 2008	
Level Up	Successful	November 23, 2011	
Exchange Student Zero	Successful	December 16, 2012	
Monster Beach	Successful	October 31, 2014	

== See also ==
- List of Cartoon Network films
- List of programs broadcast by Cartoonito
- List of programs broadcast by Adult Swim
- List of programs broadcast by Boomerang
- List of programs broadcast by Toonami
- List of programs broadcast by Discovery Family
- List of Cartoon Network Studios productions
- Hanna-Barbera Studios Europe filmography
