= Nandi Bushell =

British–South African musician and social media personality

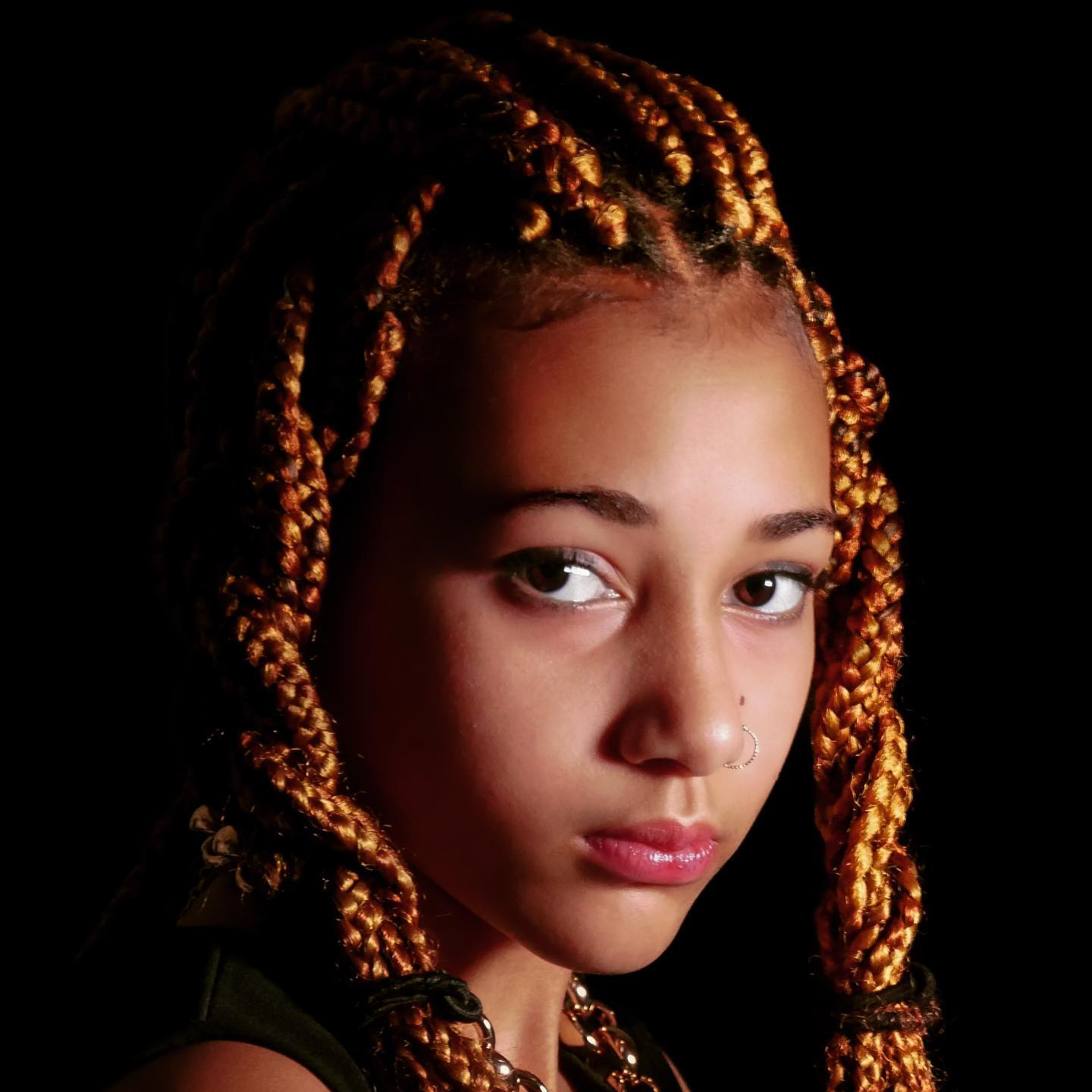
- Bushell in 2022

Background information
- Born: Nandi Lily Bushell; 28 April 2010 (age 16); Durban, South Africa
- Origin: Ipswich, Suffolk, England
- Genre: Rock
- Instruments: Drums; guitar; bass guitar; piano; saxophone; vocals
- Years active: 2018–present

YouTube information
- Channel: Nandi Bushell
- Subscribers: 460 thousand
- Views: 98.8 million
- Last updated: 4 August 2026

Nandi Lily Bushell (/ˈnændiː ˈbʊʃəl/ NAN-dee BUSH-əl; born 28 April 2010) is a South African-born British musician, singer, songwriter, and social media personality. She became known for her drumming skills by posting cover versions of popular rock songs to her YouTube and Instagram accounts, and her online drum battle with Dave Grohl received international coverage in 2020. By age ten, Bushell's videos had earned the attention of musicians including Grohl, Lenny Kravitz, Anderson .Paak, and Questlove, and led to numerous television appearances.

Bushell was the youngest artist featured on the cover of Modern Drummer magazine and is the first-ever musician-in-residence at Cartoon Network. She has performed with Kravitz and in concert with Grohl's band Foo Fighters, and was a featured guest at the Platinum Jubilee of Elizabeth II in London.

Bushell has been writing and recording her own music since age ten. Three of those songs, in which she performs all parts, were offered as singles ahead of her first EP, Into the Abyss, set for 2023. Its first single, "The Shadows", was released in September 2022.

== Early life ==
Bushell was born in Durban; her mother Lungile is from KwaZulu-Natal, whilst her father John is British. Her family moved from Durban to Ipswich, Suffolk, when she was two. Bushell describes herself as "British and Zulu".

I was better than my dad in, like, two weeks.

—Nandi Bushell

I was extremely happy that Nandi was so good. But, at the same time, I was feeling quite inferior ... to a five-year-old.

— John Bushell
Variety, 4 February 2021

Her parents are not musicians, though her father played in bands during his university years. When John showed his children a video for The Beatles' "Hey Jude", Bushell was fascinated by Ringo Starr's performance and showed an interest in playing the drums. Her parents bought her first drum kit as a reward for good grades at school; whilst accompanying his daughter on guitar, he saw that his five-year-old daughter had strong skills at keeping a beat. At age six, Bushell began taking lessons with a local drum teacher; her first week was "really hard, but then I just got it." With her dad's help, Bushell began posting to social media her covers of various songs, including a music video he created with an alien theme as seven-year-old Nandi drummed along to "Toxicity" by System of a Down. She also attended jam sessions at a local pub, where she played with adult musicians as part of the Ipswich Rock Project.

== Career ==
=== Music ===
==== Viral videos; Dave Grohl drum battle (2018–2021) ====
Bushell's videos on social media were spotted by established musicians, many of whom offered gifts. After Questlove saw one of her Instagram videos, he sent her a custom child-sized drum kit. Her cover of "Use Me" caught the attention of Anderson .Paak, and Lenny Kravitz invited Bushell to meet and accompany him during a sound check at The O2 Arena whilst on tour in June 2019. Kravitz and drummer Nate Smith later sent Bushell a custom drum kit. In July 2019, she was invited to meet with Questlove at the On Blackheath festival at Blackheath. After her multi-instrument cover of "Plug In Baby" was seen by Muse's Matt Bellamy, he gifted her one of his signature guitars.

Her drum cover of Nirvana's "In Bloom" went viral in November 2019, gaining over 10 million views via Twitter within a week. Dave Grohl, the drummer on Nevermind, learned of the video from album producer Butch Vig, and was amazed by her "joy and energy". In August 2020, in the midst of the COVID-19 pandemic, Bushell uploaded a cover of "Everlong" by Foo Fighters, another of Grohl's bands, and challenged him to a drum-off, calling him her favourite drummer. Grohl thought it was "adorable", but his friends kept texting him, "dude, you need to step up and respond to this. You have to represent." Grohl responded by drumming along with "Dead End Friends" by his supergroup Them Crooked Vultures to return the challenge to Bushell. After she posted a video drumming to the same song, Grohl conceded defeat. He subsequently performed an original song inspired by Bushell; she responded by writing and recording a song dedicated to Grohl. The remote drum battle received international coverage, drew millions of views, and bolstered Bushell's presence on social media: within six months, she had over 800,000 followers on Instagram and 250,000 followers on YouTube.

Grohl cited their drum-off as the reason he chose February 2021 to release Medicine at Midnight, which Foo Fighters had been holding back during the pandemic. "I hope our record can make people feel the same [joy] as my drum battle with Nandi."

==== Foo Fighters concert ====
During a video chat with Bushell in November 2020, Grohl invited her to perform with him and Foo Fighters on stage once they were able to tour again. They met in person for the first time on 26 August 2021 at The Forum in California, where Grohl introduced his "arch nemesis" on drums to perform "Everlong" and close the sold-out show. In her review for Variety, Jessica Shalvoy wrote that Bushell was "absolutely shredding ... [she] sounded like she'd been touring with Foos for the past 26 years", despite having met in person that same night. Kelli Skye Fadroski of The Orange County Register called it "epic"; Billboard's Gil Kaufman wrote, "the band's ecstatic preteen protégé flawlessly played them home like a pro."

Bushell's viral appearance led to the return in September of "Everlong" to the music charts. The 1997 song also made Billboard's Hot Hard Rock Songs (#2), Hot Rock & Alternative Songs (#11), and Hot Alternative Songs (#17) lists, none of which existed when it was released.

==== Musicianship (2021–present) ====
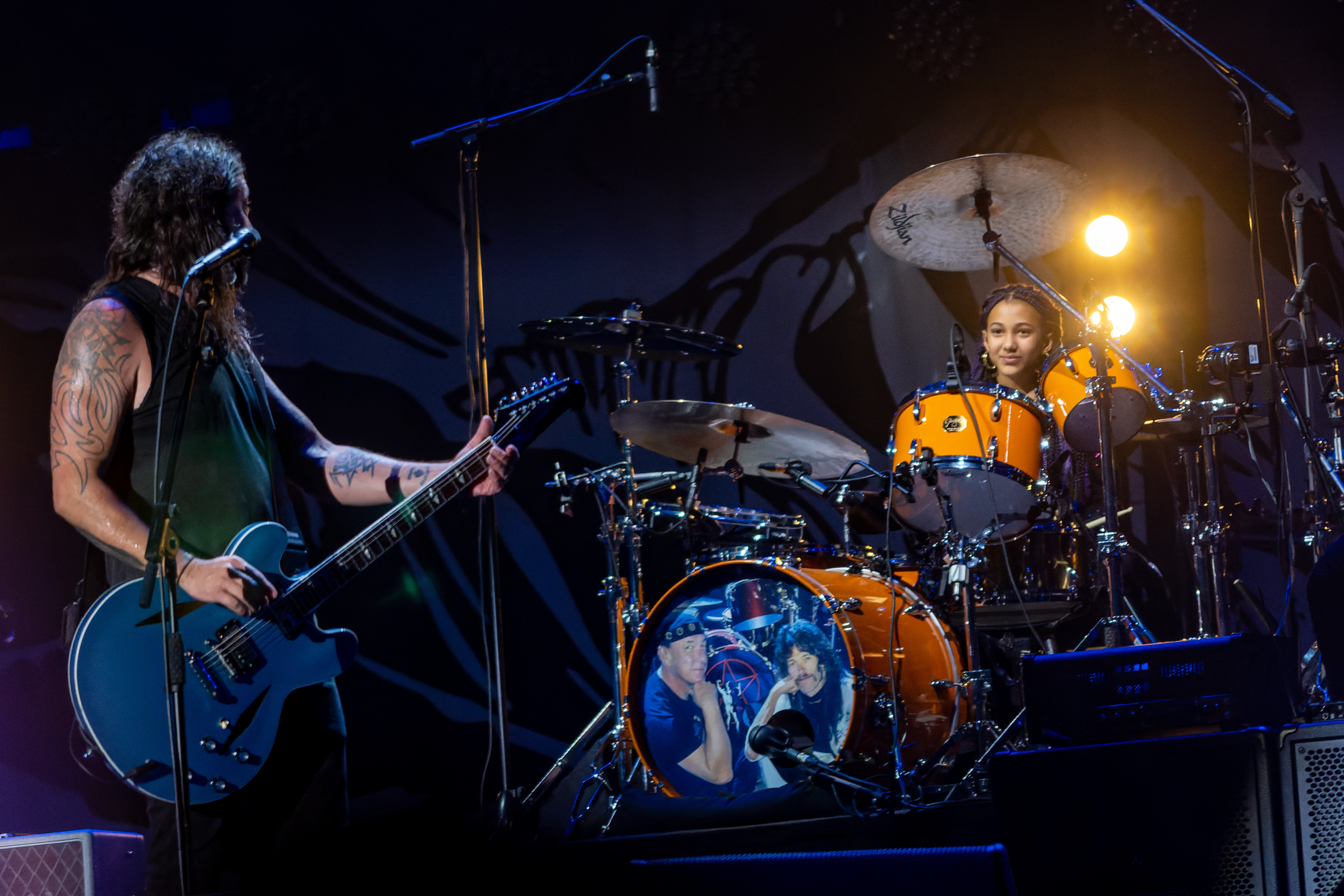
Nandi Bushell (r) joins Dave Grohl (l) and Foo Fighters for the Taylor Hawkins tribute concert at Wembley Stadium in September 2022.

Bushell and Roman Morello wrote and performed the song "The Children Will Rise Up" in October 2021 to warn of the dangers of climate change. The music video features Roman's father Tom Morello, along with Jack Black and Greta Thunberg.

In addition to drums, Bushell plays lead and bass guitar and piano; her videos include covers of rock songs in which she performs all parts using both video synchronization and a loop station. She also plays saxophone, including for her covers of songs by Bill Withers and John Coltrane.

Bushell has written and recorded an EP, Into the Abyss, and performs all parts; its first single, "The Shadows", was released on 30 September 2022. The song is "quite dark", and Bushell said she wrote it to help her father and others going through depression. Gen Handley of Spin magazine called the song "incredibly moving and mature"; Matt Owen of Guitar World wrote that whilst her musical inspirations are present in the "haunting, riff-heavy" song, "it also introduces us to a nuanced Nandi flair, one that showcases her approach to melody and arrangement."

Bushell's live appearances in 2022 included the Platinum Jubilee of Elizabeth II in June, where she participated in both the Platinum Party at the Palace and the Platinum Jubilee Pageant. In September, Bushell was one of dozens of artists invited to join Foo Fighters on stage for the Taylor Hawkins tribute concert at Wembley Stadium, where she performed "Learn to Fly" using drumsticks given to her by Hawkins the year before. Dave Grohl introduced her as "our friend, the coolest fucking drummer in the world" and added, "she's the biggest rock star on the bill. I know we got Queen and Rush and all that shit, but we got Nandi tonight." Bushell called it both epic and bittersweet to play Wembley "under very sad circumstances".

Bushell released another original song, "Sweet Nightmares", in October 2023, which was produced with help from Carl Restivo. The song is remininecent of the style of Slipknot, whom she called "her favorite band". The song features Josh Brolin on some backing vocals, and who appears thanks to a common friendship with photographer Brian Bowen Smith.

In March 2025, Bushell announced that she started a band called Blu Reflection with two of her friends. The band released their first single titled “The Only One” that same month.

=== Television ===
==== Advertising ====
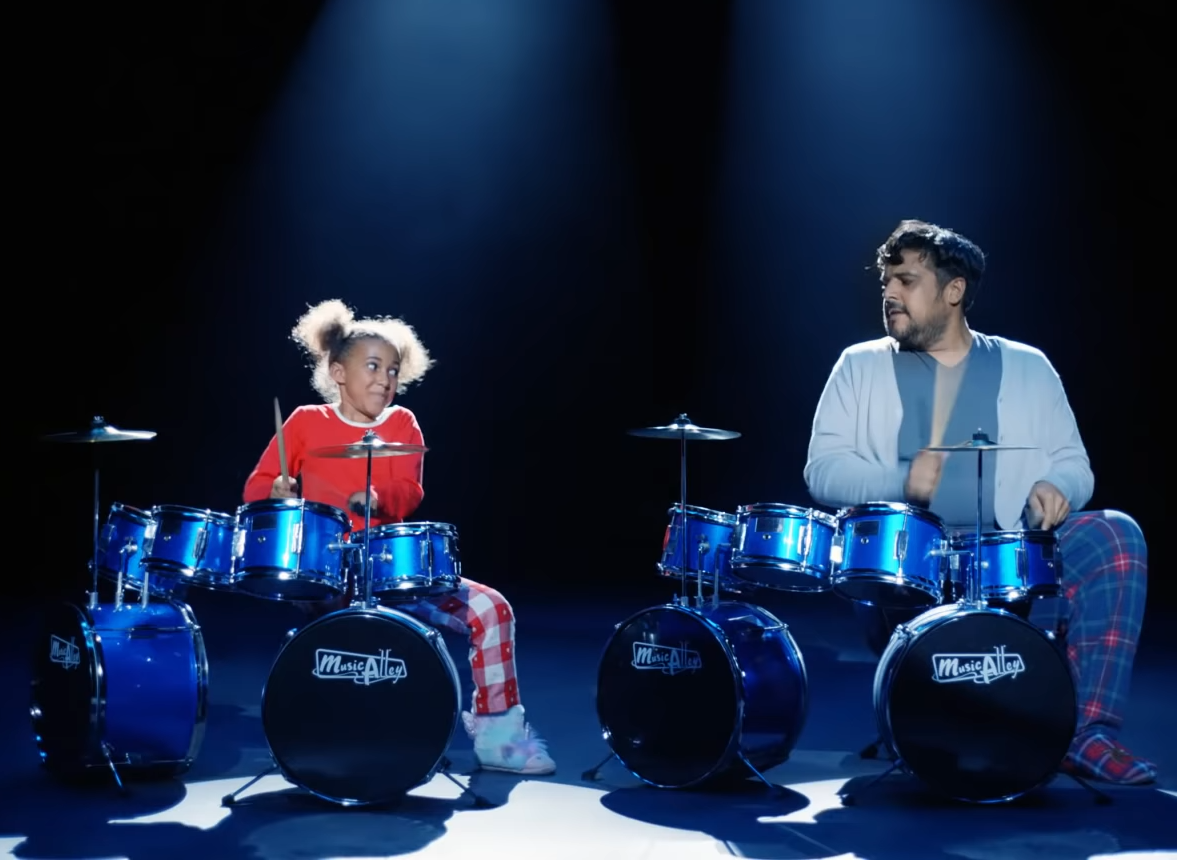
Nandi Bushell and Omar Abidi (l-r) perform in "The Book of Dreams" advert for Argos (Christmas 2019).

Bushell was one of four young musicians who recorded "Bohemian Rhapsody" for a John Lewis & Partners advertisement in 2018. The casting process required that she audition three times.

In November 2019, Bushell portrayed a young girl performing "Don't You (Forget About Me)" in an award-winning Christmas advertisement for Argos alongside actor and drummer Omar Abidi as her father. Creative director Danny Hunt said casting the daughter role was "actually really stressful", and he worried that the ad wouldn't work until they saw Bushell. Argos marketing manager Becky Desert said Bushell was "the obvious choice" out of more than 100 children, "being upbeat, fun and celebrating the excitement of dream fulfillment at Christmas". (Note: Also in November, Simple Minds drummer Cherisse Osei invited Bushell to meet up at Wembley Drum Centre; Osei later posted a video of her and Bushell playing along to the same song.)

Argos featured Bushell in its 2020 campaign, "Drum From Home". The adverts encouraged viewers to improvise drum kits during the COVID-19 lockdown.

==== Other appearances ====
That December, she made her first trip to the United States to be a guest on The Ellen DeGeneres Show. After Bushell told DeGeneres that she wanted to learn bass guitar, DeGeneres presented one as a gift.

Still age nine, Bushell appeared on the Scandinavian chat show Skavlan in 2020. During the interview, Dua Lipa invited her to go on tour.

Bushell and her brother Thomas appeared as animated versions of themselves in the seventh-season episode of Teen Titans Go!, "Jump City Rock" which premiered on 12 September 2022.

Bushell plays character Emerald in the third season of Andy and the Band on CBeebies. She is the Goddaughter of the Godfather of Rock Brian May, and assists the band in saving Planet Rock by posing as their new manager to help them win the Battle of the Bands.

=== Film ===
Director Kay Cannon cast Bushell as a drummer girl in the 2021 American film Cinderella after convincing Bushell's father that she would be perfect for the role. She has since become friends with Cannon and co-star Camila Cabello.

== Accolades ==
Cartoon Network named Bushell their first official musician-in-residence in February 2021. She was featured on the cover of the June 2021 issue of Modern Drummer, the magazine's youngest cover artist to date. Hit Like a Girl named Bushell one of its ambassador heroes for 2021.

In February 2022, Drumeo presented her with their inaugural Tony Williams award for her "infectious energy and passion [that] encourages and inspires people to get excited about drumming and about music". She was named the winner following an online poll.

During the 7 October 2022 episode of Blue Peter, Bushell was awarded the Gold badge for her musical achievements and for "raising awareness about inequality". The Gold badge is the programme's highest honour; past winners include Ed Sheeran, Madonna, and Queen Elizabeth II.

Bushell was voted #2 by readers of MusicRadar in December 2022 for its annual list of "best online drum personalities". It was her third straight year in that spot.

She is portrayed, along with 24 other woman musicians, in the book Rebel Girls Rock, the latest edition of the Rebel Girls series, released in the week of International Women's Day 2023.

== Personal life and advocacy ==
Many social movements have been started and sustained by young people. Nandi and Roman [Morello] used music as a way to share their compelling message about why we need to take action on climate change.

— Barack Obama
Facebook, 10 November 2021

Bushell lives with her parents and her younger brother Thomas in Ipswich. She has been involved in numerous local and international humanitarian causes including the annual fireworks display at Christchurch Park, which raises funds for Scouting and other organisations.

In October 2021, Bushell was one of dozens of drummers and other musicians invited by Ringo Starr to perform a cover of The Beatles' "Come Together" for the WhyHunger project. Her and Roman Morello's climate song "The Children Will Rise Up" was praised by Lenny Kravitz and Simon Pegg, and Barack Obama lauded their "compelling message" from the COP26 summit.

Also in October, she took part in "Redraw Your World" for Cartoon Network and made a video for its long-running "Stop Bullying: Speak Up" campaign. She performs "live drums" in the Netflix COVID-19 documentary Convergence: Courage in a Crisis.

== Discography ==
=== Singles ===
- "Rock and Grohl – The EPIC Battle" (2020)
- "Gods and Unicorns" (2020)
- "The Children Will Rise Up!" (2021)
- "The Shadows" (2022)
- "Sweet Nightmares" (2023)
- “The Only One” (2025)

=== Albums ===
- Into the Abyss (TBD)

=== Soundtracks ===
- Convergence (Original Motion Picture Soundtrack) (2021; featured performer on "I Am Here and I Am Breathing")

== Filmography ==
Television
Year	Title	Role	Notes
2018	"When you're part of it, you put your heart into it"	Drumming girl	John Lewis & Partners Christmas advert
2019	"The Book of Dreams"	Daughter	Argos Christmas advert
2019	Blue Peter	Herself	British chat show
2019	The Ellen DeGeneres Show	Herself	American chat show
2020	Skavlan	Herself	Scandinavian chat show
2020	"Drum From Home"	Herself	Argos advert series
2020	Tamron Hall	Herself	American chat show
2021	"Redraw Your World"	Herself	Cartoon Network promo
2021	"Stop Bullying: Speak Up"	Herself	Cartoon Network promo
2022	Saturday Mash-Up!	Herself	Children's entertainment programme
2022	Platinum Jubilee of Elizabeth II	Herself	Took part in both the Platinum Party at the Palace and the Platinum Jubilee Pageant
2022	Access Hollywood	Herself	American chat show
2022	Teen Titans Go!	Herself (cartoon)	Episode: "Jump City Rock" (season seven)
2022	Good Morning Britain	Herself	British chat show
2022	Blue Peter	Herself	Awarded Gold badge
2023
2023	Andy and the Band	Emerald	Goddaughter to the Godfather of Rock (Brian May) Season 3

Film
Year	Title	Role	Notes
2021	Cinderella	Drummer Girl	Drums on various items during "Let's Get Loud!"
2021	Convergence: Courage in a Crisis	Herself	Drums to "I Am Here and I Am Breathing"

Radio
Year	Title	Role	Notes
2022	"Motivate Me Mix"	Herself (host)	Programme on BBC Radio 1
