= Hall of Game Awards =

Former award ceremony on Cartoon Network

The Hall of Game Awards was an award show presented by Cartoon Network. The inaugural ceremony was hosted by Tony Hawk and aired on February 25, 2011. There were four installments of the awards, the last being held on February 17, 2014.

== 2011 ==
Tony Hawk hosted the first awards show, which aired on Cartoon Network on February 25, 2011, at 7:00 PM. The show was created and produced by IMG Media and featured musical performances by Travie McCoy and Far East Movement.

=== Winners and nominees ===
Winners are listed first and highlighted in boldface.

| All-Pro Class Clown | Alti-Dude |
|---|---|
| **Dwight Howard**; A. J. Burnett; Shaquille O'Neal; Chad Ochocinco | **Ryan Sheckler**; Travis Pastrana; Paul Rodriguez; Shaun White |
| Best Foes Forever | Captain Clutch |
| **New York Yankees and Boston Red Sox**; Tom Brady and Peyton Manning; Los Angeles Lakers and Miami Heat; Rafael Nadal and Roger Federer | **DeSean Jackson** |
| Dance Machine | Dynamic Duo |
| **Terrell Owens**; Jimmie Johnson; South African World Cup 2010 Soccer Team; Venus Williams | **Michael Smith and Zenyatta**; LeBron James and Dwyane Wade; Alex Rodriguez and Derek Jeter; Matt Ryan and Tony Gonzalez |
| Fanatic Fanstars | Gnarliest Newb |
| **Green Bay Packers fans**; Detroit Red Wings fans; Oakland Raiders fans; San Francisco Giants fans | **Sam Bradford**; Ryan Dungey; Blake Griffin; Buster Posey |
| He's Got Game | In It To Win It |
| **Drew Brees**; Kobe Bryant; LeBron James; Albert Pujols | **Carl Edwards**; Cliff Lee; Ray Lewis; Amar'e Stoudemire |
| Most Awesome Mascot | Most Viral Player |
| **Milwaukee Bucks' Bango**; Phillie Phanatic; Phoenix Suns Gorilla; Tennessee Titans' T-Rac | **Brian Kownacki flips over catcher to score**; Dude Perfect amazing basketball shot; Texas middle school trick football play; 11-year-old dunks |
| My Bad | She's Got Game |
| **Dallas Cowboys - Hot Potato Lateral**; Colorado Rockies - Pop-Up Collision; Michael Del Zotto - Hockey Puck Camera Smash; Tim Lincecum - Wild Pitch | **Danica Patrick**; Lindsey Vonn; Michelle Wie; Serena Williams |
| Sickest Showdown | Super Siblings |
| **Green Bay Packers** | **Serena and Venus Williams**; Kurt and Kyle Busch; Pau and Marc Gasol; Peyton and Eli Manning |
| That's How I Roll | We Got Game |
| **LeBron James**; David Beckham; Troy Polamalu; Brian Wilson | **Los Angeles Lakers**; Chicago Blackhawks; New Orleans Saints; San Francisco Giants |
Whoa-Ment
**Landon Donovan**

=== Presenters ===
Presenters (in alphabetical order)
- Nnamdi Asomugha
- Jake T. Austin
- Justin Bieber
- Drew Brees
- Shannon Brown
- Chewbacca
- Chris Cole
- Lucas Cruikshank
- Snoop Dogg
- Cast of Dude, What Would Happen
- Rick Fox
- Zachary Gordon
- Blake Griffin
- David Henrie
- Teck Holmes
- Greg Jennings
- Joe Johnson
- A. J. Hawk
- Jimmy Kimmel
- Lisa Leslie
- George Lopez
- Nelly
- Bobbe J. Thompson
- Venus Williams
- Andrew W.K.

== 2012 ==
The 2012 Hall of Game Awards was hosted by Shaquille O'Neal which aired on February 20, 2012 at 7:00PM ET/PT, and featured musical performances by Flo Rida and Hot Chelle Rae.

=== Winners and nominees ===
Winners are listed first and highlighted in boldface.

| Alti-Dude | Captain Clutch |
|---|---|
| **Steve McCann**; Ryan Sheckler; Kelly Slater; Shaun White | **Tim Tebow**; David Freese; Dirk Nowitzki; Abby Wambach |
| Dance Machine | Dynamic Duo |
| **Victor Cruz**; Novak Djokovic; Carl Edwards; Minnesota Lynx | **Matthew Stafford and Calvin Johnson**; Blake Griffin and Chris Paul; Clayton Kershaw and Matt Kemp; LeBron James and Dwyane Wade |
| Gnarliest Newb | He's Got Game |
| **Cam Newton**; Trevor Bayne; Craig Kimbrel; Jeff Skinner | **LeBron James**; Derek Jeter; Dirk Nowitzki; Aaron Rodgers |
| Here To Rumble | King of the Kick |
| **John Cena**; Kofi Kingston; The Miz; The Undertaker | **David Beckham** |
| Most Awesome Mascot | She's Got Game |
| **San Jose Sharks' SJ Sharkie**; Sacramento Kings' Slamson the Lion; Jacksonville Jaguars' Jaxson de Ville; Cleveland Indians' Slider | **Hope Solo**; Maya Moore; Maria Sharapova; Lindsey Vonn |
| That's How I Roll | We Got Game |
| **Dwyane Wade**; David Beckham; Serena Williams; Brian Wilson | **Green Bay Packers**; Boston Bruins; Dallas Mavericks; St. Louis Cardinals |

=== Presenters ===
Presenters
- Mordecai and Rigby from Regular Show - appearances throughout the show
- Nick Cannon - presented Captain Clutch
- The Miz and Zachary Gordon - presented Alti-Dude
- Torii Hunter - presented the Most Awesome Mascot nominees throughout the show
- The cast of Level Up - presented Hot Chelle Rae
- Leo Howard and Terrell Suggs - presented Dynamic Duo
- The cast of Dude, What Would Happen and Jimmie Johnson - presented In It to Win It
- Drew Brees - presented King of the Kick
- Nathan Kress - presented Dance Machine
- China Anne McClain and Jimmy Graham - presented She's Got Game
- Adam Hicks and A. J. Green - presented Flo Rida
- Orange and Tennis Ball from Annoying Orange - presented various awards
- Maya Gabeira, Clayton Kershaw and Noah Flegel - presented Gnarliest Newb
- Rico Rodriguez - performed the "First Human Slingshot Dunk"
- Jennette McCurdy and Tony Gonzalez - presented the Most Awesome Mascot winner

Voices included J. G. Quintel, William Salyers (as characters Mordecai and Rigby from Regular Show), and Dane Boedigheimer (as Annoying Orange).

== 2013 ==
Shaquille returned to host the 2013 ceremony with Nick Cannon as the co-host. It was held on February 11, 2013, and featured a musical performance by The Wanted.

=== Winners and nominees ===
Winners are listed first and highlighted in boldface.

| Alti-Dude | Amped Up Anthem |
|---|---|
| **Nyjah Huston**; Kelly Clark; Kelly Slater; Shaun White | **Psy - "Gangnam Style"**; Carly Rae Jepsen - "Call Me Maybe"; The Script - "Hall of Fame"; Phillip Phillips - "Home" |
| Best Foes Forever | Dance Machine |
| **Duke vs. North Carolina Tar Heels men's basketball**; Jimmie Johnson vs. Brad Keselowski; Rory McIlroy vs. Tiger Woods; San Francisco Giants vs. Los Angeles Dodgers | **Ray Lewis**; Jason Pierre-Paul; Ezekiel Kemboi; Denny Hamlin |
| Dynamic Duo | Fanatic Fanstars |
| **Eli Manning and Victor Cruz**; Misty May-Treanor and Kerri Walsh; Michael Phelps and Ryan Lochte; Kevin Durant and Russell Westbrook | **Oklahoma City Thunder**; Dallas Cowboys; New York Yankees; Notre Dame Fighting Irish |
| Gnarliest Newb | He's Got Game |
| **Robert Griffin III**; Mike Trout; Missy Franklin; Andrew Luck | **LeBron James**; Miguel Cabrera; Arian Foster; Usain Bolt |
| In It To Win It | Most Awesome Mascot |
| **David Price**; Joe Flacco; Jonathan Quick; Dwyane Wade | **Denver Nuggets' Rocky the Mountain Lion**; San Francisco Giants' Lou Seal; Kansas City Chiefs' K. C. Wolf; St. Louis Blues' Louie the Bear |
| Most Viral Player | She's Got Game |
| **9 Year-Old Girl Running Back**; Game-Winning Catch; Amazing One-Handed Catch; 67 Yard Field Goal | **Gabby Douglas**; Serena Williams; Alex Morgan; Tamika Catchings |
| Super Siblings | That's How I Roll |
| **Peyton and Eli Manning**; Pau and Marc Gasol; Staal brothers; Serena and Venus Williams | **Ryan Lochte**; Brett Keisel; Serena Williams; Jonny Gomes |
| We Got Game | Whoa-Ment |
| **USA Women's Gymnastics Team**; Miami Heat; Los Angeles Kings; San Francisco Giants | **Mitchie Brusco**; Josh Hamilton; USA Olympic Women's Swim Team; Adrian Peterson |

=== Presenters ===
Presenters (in alphabetical order)

- Jessica Alba
- The cast of Big Time Rush
- Lucas Cruikshank
- Victor Cruz
- Snoop Dogg
- Allyson Felix
- Antonio Gates
- Jonny Gomes
- The cast of Incredible Crew
- Chris Johnson
- Coco Jones
- Colin Kaepernick
- The cast of Level Up
- Laura Marano
- Bridgit Mendler
- Dominic Monaghan
- Jeff Probst
- Rico and Raini Rodriguez
- Toby Turner
- Kerri Walsh Jennings
- The Wanted
- J. J. Watt

Voices included Dane Boedigheimer (as Annoying Orange).

== 2014 ==
The 2014 Hall of Game Awards was hosted by Colin Kaepernick and Cam Newton and featured a musical performance by Fall Out Boy and Jason Derulo. With Nickelodeon airing the 2014 Kids' Choice Sports in July 2014, this would be the final Hall of Game ceremony.

=== Winners and nominees ===
Winners are listed first and highlighted in boldface

| Alti-Dude | Dynamic Duo |
|---|---|
| **Nyjah Huston**; Shaun White; Bob Burnquist; Stephanie Gilmore | **Peyton Manning and His Wide Receivers**; Clayton Kershaw and Zack Greinke; Tim Duncan and Tony Parker; Jonathan Toews and Patrick Kane |
| Most Awesome Mascot | MVC: Most Valuable Cartoon |
| **Los Angeles Kings' Bailey the Lion**; Chicago Bulls' Benny the Bull; Tampa Bay Rays' Raymond; Philadelphia Eagles' Swoop | **Adventure Time**; Regular Show; Ben 10: Omniverse; Steven Universe |
| We Got Game! | Fantastic Fanstars |
| **Miami Heat**; Alabama Crimson Tide; Chicago Blackhawks; Boston Red Sox | **Seattle Seahawks**; Texas A&M Aggies; Golden State Warriors; Pittsburgh Penguins |
| Best Cartoon Boogie | Best Foes Forever |
| **Richard Watterson from The Amazing World of Gumball**; Finn the Human from Adventure Time; Robin from Teen Titans Go!; Uncle Grandpa with a sign from Uncle Grandpa | **San Francisco 49ers vs Seattle Seahawks**; Miami Heat vs Brooklyn Nets; Novak Djokovic vs Rafael Nadal; Alabama Crimson Tide vs Auburn Tigers |
| Gnarliest Newcomer | I Got Swag |
| **Lance Coury**; Yasiel Puig; Tavon Austin; Brittney Griner | **Colin Kaepernick**; Russell Westbrook; Tom Brady; Cristiano Ronaldo |
| Rumble Royalty | Rock Anthem |
| **John Cena**; Daniel Bryan; The Miz; Randy Orton | **Fall Out Boy - "My Songs Know What You Did in the Dark (Light Em Up)"** |

== See also ==
- Kids' Choice Sports
