= Hassan Akkad =

Syrian-British filmmaker, writer and activist

- حسان عقاد
- Citizenship: Syria; United Kingdom (since 2022)
- Occupations: Filmmaker; writer; activist
- Known for: Exodus: Our Journey to Europe
- Notable work: Convergence: Courage in a Crisis; Matar; Hope Not Fear

Hassan Akkad (Arabic: حسان عقاد) is a Syrian-British filmmaker, writer and activist. A former English teacher in Damascus, he participated in anti-government demonstrations during the Syrian revolution and filmed protests against the government of Bashar al-Assad. Akkad has said that he was subsequently detained twice and tortured by Syrian security forces.

Akkad left Syria in 2012 and spent several years elsewhere in the Middle East before making an 87-day journey from Turkey to the United Kingdom in 2015. Footage that he filmed during the journey was used in the BBC documentary series Exodus: Our Journey to Europe. The programme won the BAFTA for Best Factual Series in 2017 and the International Emmy Award for Documentary later that year.

During the COVID-19 pandemic in the United Kingdom, Akkad worked as a cleaner on COVID-19 wards at Whipps Cross University Hospital in east London. In May 2020, he published a video criticising the exclusion of NHS support workers and social-care workers from a government immigration bereavement scheme. The government extended the scheme to those groups later that day.

Akkad subsequently co-directed the Netflix documentary Convergence: Courage in a Crisis (2021), was an associate producer and consultant on The Swimmers (2022), and co-wrote and directed the short film Matar (2023). His memoir, Hope Not Fear: Finding My Way from Refugee to Filmmaker to NHS Hospital Cleaner and Activist, was published in 2021.

After the fall of the Assad regime in December 2024, Akkad returned to Damascus in 2025. In 2026, he launched an online campaign questioning whether publicly announced financial pledges for Syrian reconstruction had been fulfilled. He was detained in Damascus on 17 June 2026 following complaints concerning his online activity and was released four days later.

== Early life and activism in Syria ==
Akkad grew up in Damascus, where his father ran a pizza restaurant. He worked as a high-school English teacher and as a photographer.

When anti-government demonstrations began in Syria in 2011, Akkad participated in protests and filmed them. According to Al Jazeera, he was detained twice for approximately two weeks on each occasion. Akkad has said that he was tortured during his first detention and placed in solitary confinement during the second. After his release, he was barred from working and lost his teaching job.

Akkad has said that after his first detention he was invited to meet President Bashar al-Assad at the presidential palace. According to Akkad, he told Assad about torture by the Syrian security services and criticised the government's response to protesters. Akkad has said that he believed the meeting contributed to his subsequent detention.

He left Syria in 2012 and spent the following years displaced elsewhere in the Middle East.

== Migration to the United Kingdom and Exodus ==
In 2015, Akkad began an 87-day journey from Turkey towards northern Europe. He documented parts of the journey using cameras and a mobile phone.

During an attempted crossing of the Aegean Sea from Turkey to Greece, the overcrowded inflatable boat carrying Akkad and other passengers began taking on water. The passengers were subsequently rescued by the Turkish coastguard.

Akkad continued through Europe and spent approximately two months in the Calais Jungle migrant camp in northern France. After repeated unsuccessful attempts to reach the United Kingdom from Calais, he travelled to Brussels and flew to Heathrow Airport using a counterfeit passport. He identified himself to British immigration officials after arriving and claimed asylum. He was granted asylum approximately six months later.

Footage filmed by Akkad during the journey was incorporated into the 2016 BBC Two documentary series Exodus: Our Journey to Europe, directed by James Bluemel. The programme made extensive use of footage filmed by refugees and migrants themselves.

Exodus won the BAFTA for Best Factual Series in May 2017. During the acceptance speech, Bluemel invited Akkad on stage, where Akkad spoke about people who had died attempting to reach Europe. The programme won the International Emmy Award for Documentary later that year.

After receiving asylum, Akkad joined the production team of the follow-up series Exodus: Our Journey Continues. He worked as a researcher and returned to Calais as part of the production.

== Career and public life ==
After settling in the United Kingdom, Akkad worked in television and film production and with the refugee-support organisation Help Refugees, later known as Choose Love.

In 2019, he worked as an adviser on the Channel 4 sitcom Home. He assisted writer Rufus Jones and the production with the British asylum process, Syrian cultural details and the Damascus dialect of Arabic used by the programme's Syrian protagonist.

In July 2020, Akkad worked with artist Marc Quinn on the installation of A Surge of Power (Jen Reid) 2020, a sculpture of Black Lives Matter protester Jen Reid that was temporarily placed on the Bristol plinth previously occupied by the statue of Edward Colston.

Akkad joined the Labour Party in July 2020.

=== COVID-19 pandemic ===
In April 2020, during the first wave of the COVID-19 pandemic in the United Kingdom, Akkad took a paid job as a cleaner at Whipps Cross University Hospital in east London. He worked on wards treating patients with COVID-19.

While working at the hospital, Akkad photographed colleagues working on the wards. Some of the photographs were subsequently published by Politico.

On 20 May 2020, Akkad published a video addressed to Prime Minister Boris Johnson criticising the exclusion of cleaners, porters and social-care workers from a government bereavement scheme. The scheme provided indefinite leave to remain to eligible family members of overseas health workers who died after contracting COVID-19.

Later that day, the Home Office announced that the scheme would be extended, with immediate and retrospective effect, to the families and dependants of NHS support staff and social-care workers who died after contracting COVID-19. The Observer later described Akkad's intervention as directly instrumental in the policy reversal.

=== Film and writing ===
Akkad was one of the co-directors of Convergence: Courage in a Crisis, a 2021 Netflix documentary about responses to the COVID-19 pandemic.

His memoir, Hope Not Fear: Finding My Way from Refugee to Filmmaker to NHS Hospital Cleaner and Activist, was published by Bluebird, an imprint of Pan Macmillan, on 2 September 2021.

Akkad was an associate producer on Sally El Hosaini's 2022 Netflix film The Swimmers, based on the lives of Syrian swimmers Yusra Mardini and Sara Mardini. El Hosaini said that Akkad also served as a consultant on the refugee journey depicted in the film and that footage recorded by Akkad and other refugees was used as reference material during production.

In 2023, Akkad co-wrote and directed the short film Matar, starring Ahmed Malek. The film concerns a Syrian asylum seeker working as a delivery rider in England and was based in part on the experiences of co-writer Ayman Alhussein.

Akkad was also a co-producer of Tamara Kotevska's 2023 documentary The Walk, centred on Little Amal, a giant puppet representing a Syrian refugee child. In 2023, BAFTA described Akkad as the creative director of Choose Love.

== Return to Syria and 2026 detention ==
Following the fall of Bashar al-Assad's government in December 2024, Akkad returned to Damascus in 2025 after approximately 14 years away from Syria.

In April 2026, he launched an online campaign known as Give Us the Money That You Owe!. The campaign examined donations and financial commitments publicly announced during fundraising drives for reconstruction and other projects in Syria and questioned whether particular pledges had been fulfilled.

The campaign resulted in disputes with some of the public figures and businesspeople named in Akkad's posts. Syrian journalist and presenter Mousa al-Omar filed a legal complaint concerning Akkad's social-media comments after Akkad questioned whether a financial commitment attributed to al-Omar had been fulfilled. Al-Omar disputed Akkad's claims.

On 17 June 2026, Akkad was detained at a café in the al-Malki district of Damascus. The Syrian public prosecutor said that complaints had been filed alleging online defamation, insult and slander.

Al-Omar subsequently said that he had instructed his lawyer to withdraw his complaint. Akkad was released on 21 June 2026 after four days in detention.

== Personal life ==
A 2020 profile in The Observer reported that Akkad was engaged to a Syrian woman whom he had met in the United Kingdom while she was studying there. Their planned civil wedding in London was postponed during the COVID-19 pandemic.

As of 2020, the same profile reported that Akkad's parents were living in the United Arab Emirates and that his brother was working in Yemen for the World Food Programme.

Akkad became a naturalised British citizen in 2022. He told The National that obtaining citizenship gave him a sense of security after years in which he had been unable to return safely to Syria.

== Selected filmography ==
| Year | Title | Role |
|---|---|---|
| 2016 | Exodus: Our Journey to Europe | Contributor; self-filmed footage |
| 2017 | Exodus: Our Journey Continues | Researcher |
| 2019 | Home | Adviser |
| 2021 | Convergence: Courage in a Crisis | Co-director |
| 2022 | The Swimmers | Associate producer; consultant |
| 2023 | Matar | Co-writer; director |
| 2023 | The Walk | Co-producer |

== Bibliography ==
- Akkad, Hassan (2021). Hope Not Fear: Finding My Way from Refugee to Filmmaker to NHS Hospital Cleaner and Activist. London: Bluebird. ISBN 978-1-5290-5981-6.

== Awards and recognition ==
Productions to which Akkad contributed have received several television and journalism awards.

Exodus: Our Journey to Europe won the BAFTA for Best Factual Series in 2017 and the International Emmy Award for Documentary later that year. It also won the Television Documentary Award and Refugee Reporting Award at the 2017 One World Media Awards.

The follow-up series, Exodus: Our Journey Continues, on which Akkad worked as a researcher, won the Television Documentary Award at the 2018 One World Media Awards.
