= Bobb'e Says =

American television series

- Genre: Comedy series
- Created by: Mike Harney
- Written by: Mike Harney
- Starring: Bobb'e J. Thompson
- Country of origin: United States
- Original language: English
- No. of seasons: 1
- No. of episodes: 6

Production
- Executive producer: Rafael Garcia
- Running time: 22 minutes
- Production company: Hallock-Healey Entertainment

Original release
- Network: Cartoon Network
- Release: August 19 – September 23, 2009

Bobb'e Says is a live-action clip series hosted by Bobb'e J. Thompson that aired on Cartoon Network from August 19, 2009, to September 23, 2009. It was cancelled after just one season and 6 episodes due to low ratings. In the series Thompson provided commentary about video clips that aired as part of the episode. It was part of the CN Real block, and premiered the same day as another series, Dude, What Would Happen. Bobb'e Says is Cartoon Network's shortest lived live-action series along with BrainRush, both only running for six episodes.

== Episodes ==
No.	Title	Original release date
1	"Tony Hawk's Warehouse"	August 19, 2009
2	"Theme Park"	August 26, 2009
3	"Hollywood"	September 2, 2009
4	"Skate Park"	September 9, 2009
5	"Santa Monica Pier"	September 16, 2009
6	"Third Street Promenade"	September 23, 2009
