= Convergence: Courage in a Crisis =

- Promotional poster
- Directed by: Orlando von Einsiedel; Hassan Akkad; Lieven Corthouts; Mohammadreza Eyni; Amber Fares; Guillermo Galdos; Lali Houghton; Sara Khaki; Wenhau Lin; Mauricio Monteiro Filho; Juhi Sharma
- Produced by: Orlando von Einsiedel; Dan Cogan; Liz Garbus; Amy Hobby; Laura McNaught
- Cinematography: Mohammadreza Eyni
- Edited by: Karen Sim
- Music by: Patrick Jonsson
- Production company: Grain Media
- Distributed by: Netflix
- Release date: 12 October 2021
- Running time: 113 minutes
- Country: United Kingdom
- Language: English

Convergence: Courage in a Crisis is a 2021 British documentary film made for Netflix and directed by Orlando von Einsiedel with the help of several co-directors (Hassan Akkad, Lieven Corthouts, Mohammadreza Eyni, Amber Fares, Guillermo Galdos, Lali Houghton, Sara Khaki, Wenhau Lin, Mauricio Monteiro Filho, Juhi Sharma). The film depicts the effects of the COVID-19 pandemic by following several stories throughout eight countries. It was released on 12 October 2021. The film received a nomination for ‘Outstanding Current Affairs Film’ at the 43rd News & Documentary EMMYS.

== Production ==
The film was shot by 10 teams across different countries: the U.K., Peru, India, the U.S., Iran, and Brazil.
