= Destroy Build Destroy =

American television series

- Created by: Dan Taberski; Scott Messick
- Presented by: Andrew W.K.
- Country of origin: United States
- Original language: English
- No. of seasons: 4
- No. of episodes: 37

Production
- Executive producers: Dan Taberski; Scott Messick
- Cinematography: Brett Smith
- Running time: 22 minutes
- Production companies: Mess Media; Idiot Box Productions

Original release
- Network: Cartoon Network
- Release: June 20, 2009 – September 21, 2011

Destroy Build Destroy is an American live action reality series on Cartoon Network hosted by Andrew W.K. It is a game show in which two teams destroy a random object and build vehicles from it, and then the winners destroy the losers' creation. The series originally premiered as part of a line of live-action reality series called CN Real, which aired in 2009. The series premiered on June 20, 2009, and ended its run on September 21, 2011.

Destroy Build Destroy is one of only two shows from the CN Real block (the other being Dude, What Would Happen) to have been renewed for additional seasons, as the other CN Real shows had already been cancelled earlier, due to critically negative reception.

== Premise ==
Destroy Build Destroy is a game show in which two groups (a "green or blue" team and an "orange or yellow" team, usually grouped by theme such as common interests) of three teenage contestants destroy various objects, then build vehicles out of the wreckage to compete in some kind of challenge. The show features high powered explosives, rocket launchers, bazookas, and other destructive tools. The winning team gets $3,000 and would get to destroy the losers' creation. However, if a tie occurs by the end of the final round, resulting in neither team winning, both vehicles are destroyed.

== Development ==
The show launched on June 20, 2009, as part of a new Cartoon Network programming block named CN Real.

Destroy Build Destroy was produced by Mess Media in association with Idiot Box Productions. The executive producers are Dan Taberski and Scott Messick.

The second season of the show premiered on November 4, 2009, and ranked #1 in its timeslot among boys 6–11 on all television with a total of 2.1 million watching each episode.

Destroy Build Destroy was listed as one of the returning shows on Cartoon Network for 2010–2011 television season. The third season began airing on October 6, 2010.

A fourth season was ordered and aired from June to September 2011.

== Episodes ==
=== Series overview ===
Season	Episodes	Originally released	
Season	Episodes	First released	Last released
1	6	June 20, 2009	July 22, 2009
2	8	November 4, 2009	March 17, 2010
3	8	October 6, 2010	December 1, 2010
4	15	June 1, 2011	September 21, 2011

=== Season 1 (2009) ===
Team	Wins
Orange Team	2 wins
Green Team	4 wins

No. overall	No. in season	Title	Original release date	Prod. code
1	1	"Air Cannon Assault: Skaters vs. Math Club"	June 20, 2009	101
Teams will each build an air-cannon vehicle from the wreckage of an SUV. The Math Club wins, and the Skaters' air cannon gets destroyed by a military mortar.
2	2	"Crane Wreck: Surfers vs. Techies"	June 27, 2009	104
Teams will each build a crane from the wreckage of a semi-trailer. The Surfers win, and the Techies' crane gets destroyed by a remote controlled C-4 explosive.
3	3	"Water Wars: Gear Heads vs. Sports Nuts" "Water Wars: Sports Nuts vs. Gear Heads"	July 4, 2009	102
Teams will each build an amphibious vehicle from the wreckage of a car and boat. The Sports Nuts win, and the Gear Heads' amphibious vehicle gets destroyed by a bazooka.
4	4	"Water Taxi Takedown: Gamers vs. Musicians"	July 11, 2009	106
Teams will each build a water taxi from the wreckage of a motor home. The Musicians win, the Gamers' water taxi gets destroyed by a depth charge.
5	5	"Dump Trucks of Doom: Athletes vs. Drama Club"	July 15, 2009	105
Teams will each build a dump truck from the wreckage of a minivan. The Drama Club wins, and the Athletes' dump truck gets destroyed by a load of TNT with a long fuse.
6	6	"Wide Load: Sibling Rivalry I: Younger Siblings vs. Older Siblings" "Sibling Rivalry"	July 22, 2009	103
Teams will each build a flatbed truck from the wreckage of a pick-up truck. The Older Siblings win, and the Younger Siblings' flatbed truck gets destroyed by a tank.

=== Season 2 (2009–10) ===
Team	Wins
Blue Team	3 wins
Yellow Team	5 wins

No. overall	No. in season	Title	Original release date	Prod. code	Viewers (millions)
7	1	"Football Team vs. Marching Band"	November 4, 2009	107	0.55 (2–11) (Note: (2–11) represents the number of kids aged 2–11 who watched the episode on premiere, and not every person who watched the debut.)
Teams will each build a go-kart carrier for the go-cart race over land and water, from the wreckage of a school bus. the Football Team wins, and the Marching Band's carrier gets destroyed by a World War II airplane bomb.
8	2	"Balls vs. Brains"	November 11, 2009	108	N/A
Teams will each build a fire truck from the wreckage of a police car. The Ball team wins, and the Brain team's fire truck gets destroyed by a time bomb.
9	3	"Paddle Battle: Ben 10: Alien Swarm vs Dude, What Would Happen"	November 18, 2009	109	N/A
Cartoon Network stars from Dude, What Would Happen and Ben 10: Alien Swarm will each build a foot-powered mini-boat to transport inflatable balls, from the wreckage of a Volkswagen Bug. The Ben 10 cast wins, despite the Dudes' cheating efforts, however, the Ben 10 cast gave the Dudes the trophy for great sportsmanship and their love for them. The Dudes' mini boat gets destroyed by a remote controlled explosive boat.
10	4	"Sibling Rivalry II: Younger Siblings vs. Older Siblings" "Sibling Rivalry II"	December 2, 2009	110	N/A
Siblings compete to build an 18-wheel vehicle to haul boxes through a winding course, from the wreckage of a pickup truck. The Older Siblings win, and Younger Siblings' 18-wheeler gets destroyed by a Trebuchet launched pumpkin bomb.
11	5	"Grave Digger vs. Maximum Destruction"	February 24, 2010	111	N/A
Monster Jam's Grave Digger and Maximum Destruction compete with fans in a battering ram challenge to destroy car windows and cars. But first, they'll each have to make their battering rams from the wreckage of a double-wide mobile home. Team Grave Digger wins, and team Maximum Destruction's battering ram gets destroyed by a chemical filled briefcase.
12	6	"John Morrison vs. The Miz" "The Miz vs. John Morrison"	March 3, 2010	114	N/A
WWE superstars John Morrison and The Miz come to compete in a surveillance car obstacle course challenge. But first, their teams; The Juggernauts and the Manglers, each have to make their surveillance cars from the wreckage of a set of two cars in a V formation. The Juggernauts win, and the Manglers' surveillance car gets destroyed by a wire guided rocket.
13	7	"Dads vs. Kids"	March 10, 2010	112	N/A
Kids take on their dads by each building a giant claw grabber from the wreckage of a 25-foot sailboat. The Dads win, and the Kids' claw grabber gets destroyed by a remote controlled tank.
14	8	"Country Fans vs. Rock'n Rollers" "Rock 'n Rollers vs. Country Fans"	March 17, 2010	113	N/A
Teams compete by each building a noise machine from the wreckage of a car/trailer combo. The Country Fans win, and the Rock'n Rollers' noise machine gets destroyed by high powered explosives.

=== Season 3 (2010) ===
Team	Wins
Blue Team	4 wins
Yellow Team	3 wins
Ties	1 tie

No. overall	No. in season	Title (Note: Alternate titles sourced from the United States Copyright Office.)	Original release date	Prod. code	Viewers (millions)
15	1	"NFL Explosion: Gates vs. Merriman"	October 6, 2010	204	1.19
Antonio Gates and Shawne Merriman of the San Diego Chargers go up against themselves, as their teams each build wide recie-vehicles from the wreckage of a pickup truck. Team Gates wins, and Tean Merriman's wide recie-vehicles get destroyed by a wire guided football rocket.
16	2	"Scooby-Doo! Curse of the Lake Monster vs. Dude, What Would Happen"	October 13, 2010	207	1.43
The Dudes return for a duel with Scooby Doo! cast Robbie Amell, Kate Melton, and Nick Palatas, as they each build boat launcher/sinkers from the wreckage of an old van. Surprisingly, the duel ends up in a tie, and both teams' boat launcher/sinkers get destroyed by a whole bunch of explosives. This marks the only episode in the show where both teams don't win.
17	3	"NASCAR Pileup: Carl Edwards vs. Joey Logano" "Edwards vs. Lagano"	October 20, 2010	208	1.73
NASCAR fans team up with their heroes, as they each build a pit vehicle from the wreckage of an old fashioned station wagon. Team Logano wins, and Team Edwards' pit car gets destroyed by a time bomb.
18	4	"Midnight Battle: Big Bros vs. Little Bros"	October 27, 2010	201	1.29
Little brothers take on their big brothers in a battle at night by each building a battleship from the wreckage of a military truck. The Big Brothers win, and the Little Brothers' battleship gets destroyed by a high powered laser.
19	5	"Street Ballers vs Motocrossers"	November 3, 2010	202	1.09
A team of Motocrossers take on a group of Streetballers by each building a bash boat from the wreckage of 6 cars that get wrecked in a demolition derby. The Motocrossers win and the Streetballers' bash boat gets destroyed by a load of explosives, which is triggered by a special button that was activated by ramming a car into it.
20	6	"Sons vs. Moms" "Moms vs. Sons"	November 10, 2010	203	1.26
The sons take on their moms by each building a mobile trash compactor from the wreckage of a minivan. The Sons win, and the Moms' trash compactor gets destroyed by five hand grenades.
21	7	"Students vs. Teachers" "Teachers vs. Students"	November 17, 2010	205	1.49
Students battle their teachers by each building a mobile spitball shooter from the wreckage of a school bus. The Students win, and the Teachers' spitball shooter gets destroyed by a voice-controlled bomb.
22	8	"Footballers vs. Cheerleaders"	December 1, 2010	206	N/A
The Footballers and the Cheerleaders each build half of an air cannon combat vehicle from the wreckage of half of a stretch limo. The Footballers win, and Cheerleaders' half of the combat vehicle gets destroyed by flaming arrow.

=== Season 4 (2011) ===
Team	Wins
Blue Team	8 wins
Yellow Team	7 wins

No. overall	No. in season	Title	Original release date	Prod. code	Viewers (millions)
23	1	"Food Fight: Valley Girls vs. Jersey Boys" "New Jersey Boys vs. Valley Girls"	June 1, 2011	301	0.84
It's an East Coast-West Coast battle, as the Valley Girls take on the Jersey Boys by each building a pizza delivery truck with a built-in assembly line from the wreckage of a fruit filled produce truck. The Jersey Boys win, and the Valley Girls' pizza delivery truck gets destroyed by a toaster bomb.
24	2	"Sports Mashup: The Speed Freaks vs. Chillaxers" "Speed Demons vs. Chillaxers"	June 8, 2011	305	1.00
The Speed Freaks take on Chillaxers by each building an SUV from the wreckage of, get this, an SUV. The Speed Freaks win, and the Chillaxers' SUV gets destroyed by a golf ball.
25	3	"Weird Science-Attack of the Geniuses: The Straight A's vs. The A Gamers"	June 15, 2011	302	1.11
The Straight A's take on the A Gamers as they each build an electromagnetic machine from the wreckage of a book-mobile. The Straight A's win and the A Gamers' electromagnetic machine gets destroyed by a bunch of explosives triggered by a switch.
26	4	"Battleship Boom: Triple Barrels vs Frenemies" "Bullseyes vs. Frenemies"	June 22, 2011	306	1.07
The Triple Barrels take on the Frenemies by each building battleships from the wreckage of a car. the Triple Barrels win, and the Frenemies' battleship gets destroyed by plastic explosives.
27	5	"Submarine Showdown: Army Brats vs. Navy Seals" "Army Brats v. Navy Brats"	June 29, 2011	309	1.06
The Navy Seals take on the Army Brats by each building a submarine from the wreckage of a boat. The Navy Seals win, and Army Brats' submarine gets destroyed by a subsonic explosion.
28	6	"Battle of the Blimps: Mad-Moves vs. Mad Scientists"	July 20, 2011	310	0.96
The Mad Scientists take on the Mad Moves by each building a blimp-mobile from the wreckage of a sailboat. The Mad Moves win, and the Mad Scientists' blimp-mobile gets destroyed by having their blimp drop explosives onto their blimp-mobile.
29	7	"Celebrities: Skaters vs. BMXers"	July 27, 2011	304	1.08
The Skaters take on the BMXers by each building ramp haulers from the wreckage of a mall cop car. The Skaters win and the BMXers' ramp hauler gets destroyed by a destruction in a box.
30	8	"Ultimate Warrior: Team Captains vs. Class Presidents" "Class Presidents vs. Team Captains"	August 3, 2011	307	1.20
The Class Presidents take on Team Captains as they each a chariot from the wreckage of a pickup truck pulling a horse trailer. The Team Captains win and the Class Presidents' chariot gets destroyed by a flaming ball of fire launched by a trebucet.
31	9	"Andrew's TV Funhouse: Dee Jays vs. Dirt Bikers"	August 10, 2011	303	1.24
The Dee Jays take on the Dirt Bikers by each building a water canon boat from the wreckage of a clown car. The Dirt Bikers win, and the Dee Jays' water cannon boat gets destroyed by a teddy bear stuffed with TNT.
32	10	"Urban Cowboy: The Engineers vs. The Hams"	August 17, 2011	308	1.28
The Hams take on The Engineers by each building a wrangler from the wreckage of a ranch truck. The Hams win, and the Engineers' wrangler gets destroyed by two lines of gunpower leading up to a load of TNT.
33	11	"Destroyers in Space: Black Belts vs. The Cleats"	August 24, 2011	313	1.09
The Cleats take on Black Belts by each building bottle rocket launchers from the wreckage of a sports car. The Cleats win, and the Black Belts' bottle rocket launcher gets destroyed by fireworks.
34	12	"Destroy Sweet Destroy: Tricksters vs. Trash Talkers"	August 31, 2011	315	1.05
The Tricksters take on the Trash Talkers by each building a moving boat from the wreckage of a moving truck. The Trash Talkers win, and the Tricksters' moving boat gets destroyed by a six-bomb salute.
35	13	"Team Wentz vs. Team Chiddy" "Team Chiddy vs. Team Wentz"	September 7, 2011	314	1.06
Team Wentz takes on Team Chiddy by building tire launchers from the wreckage of a band van. Team Chiddy wins, and Team Wentz's tire launcher gets destroyed by an analog time bomb.
36	14	"The Art of Destruction: The Glee Club vs. 4.0's"	September 14, 2011	311	0.85
The Glee Club takes on the 4.0's by each building graffiti machines from the wreckage of a delivery truck. the Glee Club wins, and the 4.0's grafiti machine gets destroyed by a load of TNT.
37	15	"Catch and Destroy: The Models vs. Grease Monkeys"	September 21, 2011	312	0.99
The pretty boy models take on the car loving girls by building fishing trawlers from the wreckage of a camper van. The Models win, and the Grease Monkeys' trawler gets destroyed by a ring of fire.
