= Dude, What Would Happen =

American reality television series

- Genre: Reality television
- Created by: Chuck Dalaklis
- Starring: C.J. Manigo; Jackson Rogow; Ali Sepasyar
- Theme music composer: Charles Dalakis
- Composer: Charles Dalaklis
- Country of origin: United States
- Original language: English
- No. of seasons: 3
- No. of episodes: 37

Production
- Executive producers: Chuck Dalaklis; Casey Brumels; Brad Kuhlman
- Producer: Cameron Dieterich
- Cinematography: Charles Dalaklis
- Editors: Jason Lee; Rick Roberts
- Camera setup: Charles Dalaklis
- Running time: 22 minutes
- Production companies: Dalaklis Media Enterprises; Ping Pong Productions

Original release
- Network: Cartoon Network
- Release: August 19, 2009 – September 21, 2011

Dude, What Would Happen is an American live-action reality series that aired on Cartoon Network originally as part of its CN Real block, which aired a line of live-action reality shows promoted in the summer of 2009. The show premiered on August 19, 2009, preceded by another CN Real series Bobb'e Says. The show is hosted by three male teenagers (C.J. Manigo, Jackson Rogow, and Ali Sepasyar) who wondered what would happen if some wild event, scheme or experiment were to occur. The three teens attempt to create the event themselves and consult experts ("The Lab Dudes") when needed.

The series went on to have three seasons aired throughout a span of two years, in which the series eventually ended in September 2011, as the series was not announced for a renewal by Cartoon Network.

Dude, What Would Happen was one of only two CN Real shows (the other being Destroy Build Destroy) to have been renewed for additional seasons, as the other CN Real shows had already been cancelled earlier due to critically negative reception.

== Cast ==
- C.J. Manigo
- Jackson Rogow
- Ali Sepasyar

== Production ==
In the "Dudes Make It Happen" weekend special, it was revealed that new episodes were coming. These episodes ranked #1 in their time slot among boys 6–11 on all television.

The show was listed as returning for Cartoon Network's 2010–2011 season. The next season began airing on October 6, 2010.

In February 2011, Vincent Cariati renewed his contract to serve an additional four seasons as the series' showrunner, co-creator and co-executive producer. The show had three seasons aired, but was not announced as a returning series, automatically cancelling the series altogether.

== Episodes ==
=== Series overview ===
Season	Episodes	Originally released	
Season	Episodes	First released	Last released
1	18	August 19, 2009	May 20, 2010
2	8	October 6, 2010	December 1, 2010
3	11	June 1, 2011	September 21, 2011

=== Season 1 (2009–10) ===
Deep Freezing/Sling Shots/Identical Items Crash Each Other

No.	Title	Original release date
1	"Underwater Roll/Defying Gravity/Pirates vs. Vikings"	August 19, 2009
C.J., Jackson and Ali try to cool off on a hot day, lift a sumo, and have a battle between pirates and Vikings.
2	"Remote-Controlled Objects/Fire vs. Ice/Pizza Delivery Improvements"	September 9, 2009
C.J., Jackson and Ali try to remote-control sports, have a battle between a flamethrower and an ice cannon and try to improve pizza delivery.
3	"Zits/Water Walk/Like vs. Like"	September 16, 2009
C.J., Jackson and Ali pop "some awesome acne", walk on a human bridge, and have a "like vs. like" contest.
4	"Dodgeball/Loudest Fart/Cartoons"	September 23, 2009
C.J., Jackson and Ali play video game dodge-ball, try to make the loudest fart noise by using 100 whoopie coushies and one big one, and reenact cartoon charters.
5	"New Brakes/Water Sports Without Water/Superheroes"	September 30, 2009
C.J., Jackson and Ali took brakes to new heights, try water sports without the water, and try to emulate superheroes.
6	"Wind Power/Popcorn/Superpowers"	October 7, 2009
C.J., Jackson and Ali try to play sports in extreme weather, make their own superhero alter egos to help with their chores and make popcorn without a microwave.
7	"Revenge of the Pigs/Peanut Butter/Spy Dudes"	October 14, 2009
C.J., Jackson and Ali play The Three Little Pigs beating the Big Bad Wolf, unleash the "power of peanut butter" to the max and become super spies.
8	"Pimp My Hide/Car vs. Boat/Animal Snacks"	October 21, 2009
C.J., Jackson and Ali design their own fashions, have a race between a car and a boat, and become animal foods.
9	"Speeding Up School/Piñatas/Vampires"	October 28, 2009
C.J., Jackson and Ali think of faster ways to get to class, have a piñata battle, and invite Bobb'e J. Thompson to help "slay vampires".
10	"Party Games/Superhero Rescues/Basketball"	March 24, 2010
C.J., Jackson and Ali make "simple party games" more "hard core", do superhero rescuing, and take basketball to "a new level".
11	"Airplane Challenge/Ninja Slicing/Backyard Battle"	March 31, 2010
C.J., Jackson, and Ali have an airplane challenge, face a ninja in a slicing contest, and host a backyard battle.
12	"Lunchroom/Celebrations/Monster Movies"	April 8, 2010
C.J., Jackson, and Ali try to speed up the lunchroom, make ultimate sports celebrations, and reenact their favorite monster movies
13	"Human Arcade Games/School/Nature"	April 15, 2010
C.J., Jackson, and Ali become human arcade games, try speeding up getting ready for school, perform stunts based on nature films, and they play the parts of predator and prey.
14	"Balls/3D Classes/Cartoon Rivalries"	April 22, 2010
C.J., Jackson, and Ali become human balls, do experiments in 3D, and bring cartoon rivalries to life
15	"Fly Ourselves/Velcro/Camp Anywhere"	April 29, 2010
The Dudes make a bed bounce by attaching pogo sticks to it in the third-season premiere. They also try to bowl an 8-foot ball from a helicopter
16	"Texting/Word Combos/Prom"	May 6, 2010
C.J., Jackson, and Ali text as cavemen, remake word combos, and try to fix prom.
17	"Toilets/Dunks/Bungee"	May 13, 2010
The Dudes freeze a portable toilet; CJ tries to dunk on a 25-foot-basket using a reverse bungee.
18	"Mobile Sports/Jobs/Mail"	May 20, 2010
C.J., Jackson, and Ali make sports mobile, try getting their jobs done faster, and try making regular mail more like email.

=== Season 2 (2010) ===
No.	Title	Original release date
19	"Marble Surfing/Ultimate Entrance/Skewering"	October 6, 2010
The dudes surf in class and plan a grand entrance on the football field in the season 3 premiere.
20	"Crash Test Dummies/Space Dance Battle/Extreme Tetherball"	October 13, 2010
The dudes have a dance-off in space and try zero-gravity bowling. Later, they put an extreme twist on playground games.
21	"Bull in a China Shop/Rock and a Hard Place/Samurai Knight Battle"	October 20, 2010
The guys test out clichés, acting like bulls in a china shop and becoming stuck between a rock and a hard place.
22	"Car Wash Laundry/Sumo Tug of War/Werewolf Vampire Battle"	October 27, 2010
The dudes do there laundry in a car wash, a triticale tug of war, Bobb'e J. Thompson guest stars for sumo tug of war, monster truck and a bulldozer tug of war and a vampire vs werewolf battle
23	"Sky Dunk/Drift Car/Party Plane"	November 3, 2010
The dudes try to dunk like the pros. Later, they throw a party on a stunt plane.
24	"Summer Winter Olympics/Aqua Power Rescue/Ice Cream Cannonball"	November 10, 2010
Olympic-inspired experiments combine winter and summer games.
25	"Paintball Artists/Safe Explosion/Trailer Destruction"	November 17, 2010
The Dudes try to crack a safe using dynamite and a car crusher.
26	"Night Sports/Mall Battle/Reverse Race"	December 1, 2010
The dudes play sports in the dark and add electricity to household chores.

=== Season 3 (2011) ===
No.	Title	Original release date
27	"Camp Anywhere/Bounce the Un-bouncable/Pierce with An Arrow"	June 15, 2011
The guys attempt to canoe on a street, bounce a piano on a trampoline and fling an arrow through a house.
28	"Sticky Power Bubble Gum/Test of Force/Battled Velcro"	June 22, 2011
Jackson takes part in a magic trick; the Dudes encounter a giant sneeze; and the guys mix boating with Velcro.
29	"Hardcore Games/Feathers/Hard Candy"	June 29, 2011
Andrew W.K. joins the Dudes for an extreme potato-sack race and a game of hot potato.
30	"Sticky Bubble Gum/Spitballs to the Next Level/Famous Sayings"	July 20, 2011
The guys navigate a gum gauntlet, make a spitball into a cannonball and ponder common expressions.
31	"Squish the Unsquishable/Cartoon Stunts/Shrink Ourselves"	July 27, 2011
The Dudes shrink themselves, go up against a mousetrap and ride a giant skateboard through obstacles. Later, a dummy is tied to a rocket and launched with a cannon.
32	"Animal Snacks/Pop a Giant Zit/Rodeo a Slug and a Pig"	August 3, 2011
The guys try to tame a giant slug and later attempt to lure a bear with a cookies and marshmallows.
33	"Bounce A Bike/Ram-Off/Best of Dude"	August 10, 2011
Classic sketches from the show are featured. Also, the guys try to bounce a bike and a sumo wrestlerLinebacker and Viking face off.
34	"Catapult to Sun Tan Lotion/Water Power/Werewolves vs. Vampires"	August 17, 2011
The guys apply suntan lotion using a catapult and strap a water-jet pack to a dummy.
35	"Ultimate Splash/Strength of Paper/Airbags"	August 24, 2011
The Dudes have a splash-off with each other, a lemon farmer, and a pick-up truck, Ali breaks through a giant paper back, and The Dudes have an airbag contest with Go-Karts.
36	"Best of Dude/Open a Door With a Catapult/Rodeo a Dragon"	August 31, 2011
More classic sketches are recounted. Also, the guys use a catapult to open a door and try to corral a dragon.
37	"Scarecrow and Snowman War/Dunking Tournament/Ninja Styles"	September 21, 2011
The dudes are back with a scarecrow and snowman contest and more.

== Reception ==
Dude, What Would Happen received negative reviews, being with the show is a kid-oriented version of MythBusters.

Emily Ashby of Common Sense Media gave the show three stars out of five, describing it as "teens' wacky experiments are fun for curious tweens."
