= Stop Bullying: Speak Up =

Television campaign

Stop Bullying: Speak Up is a campaign of Cartoon Network to raise awareness of bullying issues and promote positive relationships. Cartoon Network's special programming on bullying issues during the month of October coincides with National Bullying Prevention Month. The campaign directs witnesses and victims of bullying to "speak up" and enlist the help of a teacher or other responsible adult. The campaign features documentaries, public service ads, and use of existing programs to carry the anti-bullying message on the network, and directs children, parents and educators to other resources about bullying issues, including an anti-bullying pledge.

== History ==
Stop Bullying: Speak Up was created in 2010 and has partnered with the U.S. Department of Health and Human Services (Stop Bullying.gov), Boys & Girls Clubs of America, Gay, Lesbian and Straight Education Network (GLSEN), as well as The Anti-Defamation League and The Southern Poverty Law Center through its project, Teaching Tolerance, and other corporate sponsors.

In 2010, the network partnered with CNN to hold a bullying prevention town hall.

In 2011, the campaign participated in the first Bullying Prevention Summit at the White House, hosted by President Barack Obama.

In 2012, the Cartoon Network television documentary, Speak Up, included an introduction by Obama and featured children and teenagers talking about their experiences of bullying.

In 2013, The Bully Effect, a documentary hosted by reporter Anderson Cooper of CNN in conjunction with Cartoon Network kicked off the campaign to boost bullying awareness.

In 2014, Stop Bullying: Speak Up reached the goal of 1 million people taking the pledge to Speak Up and stop bullying.

In 2015, Signature CN programs such as Teen Titans Go! and The Amazing World of Gumball served as platforms for the anti-bullying message on the network. Families are encouraged to take the pledge. Cartoon Network participated as sponsor of the 2015 International Bullying Prevention Conference in Denver, CO.

National Bullying Prevention Month was founded in the United States in 2006 by PACER's National Bullying Prevention Center. (PACER is Parents Advocacy Coalition for Educational Rights, based in Minneapolis and Los Angeles.)

== Development ==
Stop Bullying: Speak Up was created in response to feedback from the network's audience of children and youth ages 6–14, which showed that bullying was among the biggest problems faced by young people. Additional research also was conducted among its viewers in 2010 by R. Bradley Snyder, author of The 5 Simple Truths About Raising Kids. Snyder is director of The Dion Initiative for Child Well-Being and Bullying Prevention, in Arizona, which evolved from the work of Stop Bulling Az., founded by Nicole Stanton, wife of Phoenix mayor Greg Stanton.

Other advisors to the Stop Bullying: Speak Up campaign include:

- Joel Haber, Ph.D. Author of The Bully Coach and nationally recognized speaker on bullying prevention.
- Ronald Slaby, Ph.D. Research Associate at Harvard Medical School and Senior Scientist at Education Development Center.
- Deborah Temkin, Ph.D. Bullying Prevention Manager for the Speak Truth to Power Program at the Robert F. Kennedy Center for Justice and Human Rights.
- David Waren Director of the Anti-Defamation League Education Division, overseeing anti-bias initiatives, Holocaust education programs, programs related to antisemitism and campus advocacy.
