= Bobb'e J. Thompson =

American actor (born 1996)

- Born: Bobb'e Jacques Thompson; February 28, 1996 (age 30); Kansas City, Missouri, U.S.
- Occupations: Actor, rapper
- Years active: 2002–present
- Website: https://soundcloud.com/kingbobbe

Bobb'e Jacques Thompson (born February 28, 1996) is an American actor and rapper.

== Career ==
Thompson is known for playing Tracy Jr. on 30 Rock; his role as child trickster Stanley on That's So Raven and its first spin-off Cory in the House; playing Ronnie Shields in Role Models (2008); the role of Jimmy Mitchell on the short-lived NBC series The Tracy Morgan Show, which lasted for one season from 2003 to 2004; his appearance in commercials for the PlayStation Portable as Marcus Rivers; and for being the host of his own television series Bobb'e Says, which aired on the Cartoon Network block CN Real, before choosing to opt out of a second season to do more films.

Thompson also had a recurring role on the hit series Tyler Perry's House of Payne. As a five year old, he performed Bow Wow's song "Bow Wow (That's My Name)", on Showtime at the Apollo hosted by Steve Harvey. The video of this has been uploaded on YouTube and has over 3 million views. In 2011, he had a supporting role as M. J. Williams on Tyler Perry's For Better or Worse. He is currently a cast member on MTV's Wild 'n Out. He also starred alongside Vince Vaughn and Paul Giamatti in 2007's Christmas comedy, Fred Claus.

== Personal life ==
In June 2021, Thompson was arrested for possession of a stolen firearm, after he attempted to bring a loaded pistol through security at Los Angeles International Airport (LAX).

In September 2025, after he was pulled over for speeding, Thompson was arrested for illegally possessing a firearm. He was found with a loaded .40 caliber handgun that had been reported stolen from Kansas City, Missouri. In September 2026, he was sentenced to 30 months in federal prison. After his prison sentence, he is scheduled to serve a three-year term of supervised release.

== Filmography ==
=== Film ===
Year	Title	Role	Notes
2004	My Baby's Daddy	Lil' Tupac	
2004	Shark Tale	Shortie #1 (voice)	
2004	Cellular	Lil' Rapper	
2004	The JammX Kids	Master Groove	Video short
2004	Snow	Hector	TV movie
2004	Full Clip	Stokley	
2006	Brother Bear 2	Additional Voices (voice)	Video
2006	Idlewild	Young Rooster	
2006	The Unauthorized Story of 'Diff'rent Strokes	Gary Coleman	TV movie
2007	Fred Claus	Samuel "Slam" Gibbons	
2008	Of Boys and Men	Little D	
2008	Columbus Day	Antoine	
2008	Role Models	Ronnie Shields	
2009	Land of the Lost	Tar Pits Kid	
2009	Imagine That	Fo Fo Figgley's Kid	
2009	Cloudy with a Chance of Meatballs	Cal Deveraux	
2010	K-Run FM	Andrew	Short
2010	Snowmen	Howard Garvey	
2010	Nic & Tristan Go Mega Dega	Fiasco	
2010	Knucklehead	Mad Hilton	
2014	Wish Wizard	Fredrick Shaffer	Short
2014	School Dance	Jason Jackson	
2015	Me and Earl and the Dying Girl	Derrick	
2021	A Rich Christmas	Big White Mike	
2021	Miracles Across 125th Street	-	TV movie

=== Television ===
Year	Title	Role	Notes
2002	My Wife and Kids	Shark	Episode: "Crouching Mother, Hidden Father"
2003	Doggy Fizzle Televizzle	Youngest Son in The Braided Bunch	Episode: "Episode #1.2"
2003–04	The Tracy Morgan Show	Jimmy Mitchell	Main cast
2004	Whoopi	Dante	Episode: "Sins of the Sister"
2004–06	That's So Raven	Stanley	Recurring cast: season 3-4
2005	Joey	Kenny	Episode: "Joey and the Spanking"
2007	Just Jordan	Goose	2 episodes
2007–08	Human Giant	Himself	Recurring cast
2008	Cory in the House	Stanley	Episode: "Uninvited Pest"
2008–09	30 Rock	Tracy Jr.	3 episodes
2009	In the Motherhood	Dakota	Episode: "Bully"
2009	Bobb'e Says	Himself	Main cast
2010	True Jackson, VP	Nate	Episode: "Little Buddies"
2010	The Boondocks	Lamilton Taeshawn (voice)	Episode: "Smokin with Cigarettes"
2010	WWE Monday Night RAW	Himself/Guest Host	Episode: "Episode #18.42"
2011	Let's Stay Together	Role Patient	Episode: "The Handyman Can't"
2011	Are We There Yet?	Jason	Episode: "The Fall of Troy Episode"
2011	Tyler Perry's House of Payne	DeShawn Spears	Recurring role: (Seasons 5–6); 14 episodes
2011–2012	Tyler Perry's For Better or Worse	M.J. Williams	Recurring role: (Seasons 1–2); 11 episodes
2012	Breaking In	Jamal Jenkins	Episode: "The Blind Sided"
2013	Elementary	Teddy	Episode: "M."
2013	Supah Ninjas	Shadow Fly	Episode: "Shadow Fly"
2017	Clash of the Vampires	Luther	Episode: "New Age"
2018–present	Wild 'n Out	Himself	Cast member: season 11-present
2019	Living Rooms	DJ DJ	Main cast

=== Music videos ===
Year	Song	Artist	Role
2004	I Want You	Janet Jackson	Himself
