= Ned Hastings =

American actor

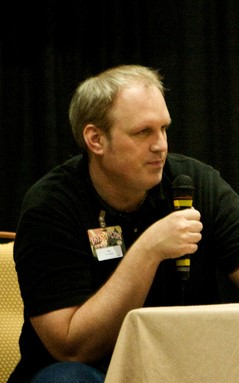
- Hastings at the Dragon Con in 2008
- Born: August 26, 1966 (age 59); Atlanta, Georgia, U.S.
- Occupations: Video editor, producer, voice actor
- Years active: 1992–present
- Known for: Aqua Teen Hunger Force; 12 oz. Mouse; Squidbillies

Edward "Ned" Hastings (born August 26, 1966), is an American video editor, producer and voice actor, best known for his work on various Adult Swim shows, most notably Aqua Teen Hunger Force. He has sometimes been credited as "Edward Hastings".

His first association with Cartoon Network was as an editor for Space Ghost Coast to Coast two years before the inception of Adult Swim. The first episode he worked on was called "My Dinner with Steven", which was to feature comedian Steven Wright, but which was never completed. Later, he edited "Fire Ant" which featured Conan O'Brien.

He edited the dialogue and audio for the earliest version of "Rabbot", the original pilot of Aqua Teen Hunger Force. After that show was given the greenlight to create its first season, Hastings came back to Williams Street Studios to edit more episodes of the Space Ghost show. His first work for Aqua Teen was as the dialogue editor for "Mayhem of the Mooninites". He became a regular episode editor in the second season, starting with the episode "Ol' Drippy". Eventually, he was made a producer of the series, along with fellow editor Jay Wade Edwards and the show's creators Dave Willis and Matt Maiellaro. He voiced himself on the episode "Super Trivia".

He has also edited dialogue for "Sealab 2021" and "Frisky Dingo" for 70/30 Productions, and he worked as an editor for six of the first seven episodes of "Squidbillies".

As a voice actor, he has appeared on Aqua Teen Hunger Force several times, and in Sealab 2021, Squidbillies, The Brak Show, Frisky Dingo, and Perfect Hair Forever.

== Filmography ==
=== Television ===
Year	Title	Role	Notes
1989	Les jupons de la Révolution	Actor	
1999–2001	Space Ghost Coast to Coast	Video Editor	
2002–2015	Aqua Teen Hunger Force	Video Editor, Producer, Voice Actor	8 episodes; Various
2003	The Brak Show	Voice Actor	1 episode; Grant Gainway
2004	Spacecataz	Producer	
2004	Perfect Hair Forever	Voice Actor	1 episode; Indian
2005–2017	Squidbillies	Video Editor, Producer, Voice Actor	7 episodes; Judge, Himself
2005	Stomp! Shout! Scream!	Actor	
2007	Frisky Dingo	Voice Actor	4 episodes
2007	Aqua Teen Hunger Force Colon Movie Film for Theaters	Video Editor	
2009	Monster Beach Party	Actor	
2011	Major Lazer	Video Editor	
2013–2015	Your Pretty Face Is Going to Hell	Video Editor	2 episodes
2013	Archer	Voice Actor	1 episode
2018	[inal Deployment 4: Queen Battle Walkthrough	Actor	1 episode
2020	12 oz. Mouse	Voice Actor	11 episodes; Professor Wilx, Shark
2022	Aqua Teen Forever: Plantasm	Producer, Lead Video Editor	
