= Aqua Teen Hunger Force season 2 =

Aqua Teen Hunger Force
- Season 2
- Volumes 2 and 3 DVD covers. The Volume Two set features episodes 1–9 and 11–12 from season two, and the Volume Three set features episodes 10 and 13–24.
- Starring: Dana Snyder; Carey Means; Dave Willis; C. Martin Croker
- No. of episodes: 24

Release
- Original network: Adult Swim
- Original release: May 25 – December 31, 2003

Season chronology
- ← Previous; Season 1 Next → Season 3

The second season of the animated television series, Aqua Teen Hunger Force originally aired in the United States on Cartoon Network's late night programming block, Adult Swim. Season two started on May 25, 2003, with "Super Birthday Snake" and ended with "The Last One" on December 31, 2003, with a total of twenty four episodes. Aqua Teen Hunger Force is about the surreal adventures and antics of three anthropomorphic fast food items: Master Shake, Frylock, and Meatwad, who live together as roommates and frequently interact with their human next-door neighbor, Carl in a suburban neighborhood in South Jersey. In May 2015, this season became available on Hulu Plus.

With twenty four episodes, season two is the longest season of the series. Episodes in season two were written and directed by Dave Willis and Matt Maiellaro. Almost every episode in this season features a special guest appearance, including the season finale "The Last One" which features the return of several guests from the first two seasons, who have reprised their roles. This season has been made available on DVD, and other forms of home media, including on demand streaming.

== Production ==
Every episode in this season was written and directed by series creators Dave Willis and Matt Maiellaro, who have both written and directed every episode of the series. All episodes originally aired in the United States on Cartoon Network's late night programming block, Adult Swim. This season was one of the original seasons branded under the Aqua Teen Hunger Force title before Willis and Maiellaro started using a different alternative title for each season in 2011. As with most seasons, several episodes originally aired outside of their production order.

With a total of twenty four episodes, Season Two is the longest season of Aqua Teen Hunger Force. The first ten episodes in Season Two (except for "The Meat Zone") feature the word "Super" in the title. Many episodes from this season include the word "the" in the title, including one episode that is simply titled "The".

Season Two is the last season to feature cold openings with Dr. Weird and Steve. After "The Cloning", Dr. Weird and Steve do not return until the 2007 movie, Aqua Teen Hunger Force Colon Movie Film for Theaters. After the movie, the only mention of them is a non-speaking cameo of Dr. Weird in the season seven episode, "One Hundred", and later makes his final appearance in season eight episode "Allen Part One". Steve is accompanied with Dr. Weird in "Allen Part One", and makes a non-speaking cameo in the season intro, but is never seen following "Last Dance for Napkin Lad."

== Cast ==
=== Main ===
- Dana Snyder as Master Shake
- Carey Means as Frylock
- Dave Willis as Meatwad, Carl, Ignignokt and Boxy Brown
- C. Martin Croker as Dr. Weird and Steve

=== Recurring ===
- Matt Maiellaro as Err, Satan, Turkatron and Cybernetic Ghost of Christmas Past from the Future
- George Lowe himself as various characters
- MC Chris as MC Pee Pants
- Andy Merrill as Oglethorpe and Merle
- Mike Schatz as Emory

=== Guest appearances ===
- Jon Glaser as Ogg in "Super Computer" and "The Last One", and Jerry in "The Broodwich"
- Brooks Braselman as Travis of the Cosmos in "Super Spore" and "The Last One"
- Seth MacFarlane as Wayne 'The Main Brain' McClane in "Super Trivia"
- Ned Hastings as a trivia night host in "Super Trivia" and himself in "The"
- Zakk Wylde wrote Master Shake's song in "Spirit Journey Formation Anniversary"
- Tom Scharpling as Willie Nelson in "The Shaving"
- H. Jon Benjamin as Mr. Sticks in "Broodwich" and Mothmonsterman in "The Last One"
- Isaac Hayes III as the unseen voice in "The Broodwich" and "The Last One"
- Jon Schnepp as the first Wisdom Cube
- Brian Posehn as the second Wisdom Cube
- Patton Oswalt as D.P. and Skeeter in "Frat Aliens" and "The Last One"
- Barry Mills as the turkey in "The Dressing"
- Jay Edwards as himself in "The"
- Scott Hilley as George Washington made out of money in "The Cloning"
- David Cross as Happy Time Harry in "The Last One"
- Todd Barry as Romulux in "The Last One"
- Todd Field as Ol' Drippy in "The Last One"
- Matt Harrigan as Major Shake in "The Last One"
- MC Chris as Sir Loin in "Super Sirloin"

== Episodes ==
No. overall	No. in season	Title	Directed by	Written by	Original release date	Prod. code
19	1	"Super Computer"	Dave Willis & Matt Maiellaro	Dave Willis & Matt Maiellaro	June 15, 2003	201
Frylock develops a spherical supercomputer/video game console that he calls the OoGhiJ MIQtxxXA (Klingon for "superior galactic intelligence"), which is accidentally sent back in time. It ends up in the hands of a caveman, Oog, who gains super-intelligence and longevity with the help of the computer, then takes out a patent on it. Guest appearance: Jon Glaser as Oog
20	2	"Super Birthday Snake"	Dave Willis & Matt Maiellaro	Dave Willis & Matt Maiellaro	May 25, 2003	202
Master Shake brings in a "rabbit" for Meatwad, which actually happens to be a snake. Meatwad tries to bond with it by stapling ears made from pipe cleaners onto its head just like a rabbit, but it angers the snake and eats him. Shake and Frylock try to get him out, but fail twice, with the second solution causing Shake to get eaten as well. Frylock then decides that the only way to free the Aqua Teens is to use his powers to blow the snake up and does so, but ends up killing them along with the snake in the explosion. Frylock goes insane out of survivor guilt and kills Carl. After being confronted by undead versions of his friends, it is revealed that the entire episode was Meatwad in a virtual reality simulation, designed by Frylock and Master Shake to teach Meatwad the consequences of owning a pet. Meatwad suddenly summons an undead rabbit to eat Frylock's brain, revealing that Frylock was the one in the simulation the entire time.
21	3	"Super Bowl"	Dave Willis & Matt Maiellaro	Dave Willis & Matt Maiellaro	June 8, 2003	203
Meatwad buys a bag of "Enchiladitos" and eats it all before Shake can have a bite. When Shake discovers a pair of free Super Bowl tickets, he is overjoyed, but Frylock mandates that they belong to Meatwad since he bought the bag and hides them. Shake wastes no time trying to get the tickets by any means possible, from attempting to find them to doing favors for Meatwad. Carl eventually learns about Meatwad's prize and also wants to go. This inspires Meatwad to use the tickets as leverage to have Shake and Carl do his bidding.
22	4	"Super Hero"	Dave Willis & Matt Maiellaro	Dave Willis & Matt Maiellaro	June 1, 2003	204
Master Shake wishes to become a super hero, so he partakes in extremely outrageous shenanigans to make himself known. After dousing himself with radioactive waste, he starts to dissolve and emit hot green fumes. From there, he decides to become a villain instead, unleashing dangerous and ridiculous schemes, which further damage his body.
23	5	"Super Model"	Dave Willis & Matt Maiellaro	Dave Willis & Matt Maiellaro	June 22, 2003	205
Master Shake repeatedly travels to Guatemala for cheap plastic surgery, while Meatwad continues to encourage him as he enjoys his personal space.
24	6	"Super Spore"	Dave Willis & Matt Maiellaro	Dave Willis & Matt Maiellaro	June 29, 2003	206
The Aqua Teens discover Travis, a spore that uses his "tongue" to penetrate Master Shake's skull and use his body to communicate. He has come to Earth to find a good job with a 401(k) and health insurance. The group decides to teach him English so he can communicate better. Unfortunately, the spore learns the hard way as Meatwad uses an "instructional tape" from Carl, which is a really a self-help tape for picking up women. He manages to learn English but with tainted grammar, incessant cursing, and being rude, much to Frylock's anger. Guest appearance: Brooks Braselman as Travis of the Cosmos.
25	7	"Super Sirloin"	Dave Willis & Matt Maiellaro	Dave Willis & Matt Maiellaro	August 31, 2003	207
Meatwad is addicted to the song "4 Da Shorteez" by Sir Loin and donates every scrap of food in the house given the subliminal messages in the lyrics he hears, much to Shake and Frylock's anger. Frylock tracks Sir Loin down to figure out what the "donation" is and what he would want with the food.
26	8	"Super Squatter"	Dave Willis & Matt Maiellaro	Dave Willis & Matt Maiellaro	September 7, 2003	208
The Aqua Teens' utilities are shut off due to Master Shake's refusal to pay the bills, repeatedly flushing them down the toilet. Instead of learning responsibility, he chooses to mooch off of Carl, making the situation even worse.
27	9	"Super Trivia"	Dave Willis & Matt Maiellaro	Dave Willis & Matt Maiellaro	September 21, 2003	209
The Aqua Teens participate in a trivia game at a local bar as team versus the one and only but smart Wayne 'The Brain' McClane. The team loses again, Meatwad having put down Backstreet Boys on half their answers, Shake putting down even far wrong answers, and Frylock lacking knowledge in sports. Frylock, sick of losing to Wayne, decides to turn it all around for the next game by using the Ludovico technique on Shake and Meatwad to boost their knowledge via a huge DVD Frylock loaded. The experiments works only for Shake, and when Frylock realizes he forgot to put sports on the colossal disc, he recruits Carl. Guest appearance: Seth MacFarlane as Wayne 'The Main Brain' McClane
28	10	"Broodwich"	Dave Willis & Matt Maiellaro	Dave Willis & Matt Maiellaro	November 2, 2003	210
Master Shake discovers a cavern where a cursed sandwich known as "the Broodwich" rests. Every time he ingests a bite of the sandwich, he is sent to a hellish dimension for a few seconds, and is warned by a disembodied voice and Frylock that anyone who eats the entire sandwich will be trapped there. Note: The alternate dimension scenes are an acknowledged homage to Don Hertzfeldt, Hertzfeldt's films, and Rejected in particular. Guest appearances: Jon Glaser as Jerry, H. Jon Benjamin as Mr. Sticks, and Isaac Hayes III as the disembodied voice heard throughout the episode.
29	11	"The Meat Zone"	Dave Willis & Matt Maiellaro	Dave Willis & Matt Maiellaro	September 14, 2003	211
While trying to injure Meatwad via a prank about crossing the road, Shake discovers Meatwad's hidden ability to see the future and tries to exploit him. Frylock suspects the powers are not real, eventually finding the source of them: Meatwad’s consumption of caulk.
30	12	"Universal Remonster"	Dave Willis & Matt Maiellaro	Dave Willis & Matt Maiellaro	September 28, 2003	212
The Plutonians, aboard their spaceship, have successfully traveled "eons" through use of their Stargate-type device called the Fargate (Oglethorpe insists theirs is different, as he does not want to get sued). They state that the purpose of the gate is to steal cable from the Aqua Teens. The only problem is that they have no chance to change the channel, because they have no remote control. However, the Plutonians have created their own, something they call the Universal Remonster - a small remote control creature with fur. They plan to use him to control their programming, but he quickly escapes. The Universal Remonster begins to control the Aqua Teens' TV, and they have no idea what's happening. Finally, Frylock investigates, and turns off the TV several times, only to have it continually turn back on. Frylock then unplugs it to see what will happen, and the Universal Remonster comes into view and plugs the TV back in. The Universal Remonster becomes Shake's personal plaything. Although the Remonster is meant for TV, Shake uses it as a device to torture Meatwad. Back at their ship, the Plutonians are going crazy after the Remonster leaves because they are high on marijuana and have become paranoid from watching horror movies. Oglethorpe also starts to trip out, believing a Goa'uld is on the ship, thus making another reference to Stargate. Eventually, Frylock discovers the Fargate under their house and finds that Emory and Oglethorpe are stealing their cable. Frylock tells them that the Remonster's batteries have run out due to Shake's abuse of it. Frylock leaves, but not before blocking the exit to the Fargate with the Aqua Teens' TV. Shake, after protesting, decides to live in the crawlspace with the TV, not knowing that Frylock has bought a brand new plasma screen TV... because, even though TV is evil, they "fucking need it."
31	13	"Total Re-Carl"	Dave Willis & Matt Maiellaro	Dave Willis & Matt Maiellaro	October 5, 2003	213
Frylock develops a super toilet and tricks an unwilling Carl into testing it, only to be forced to try to keep him alive when the test goes awry.
32	14	"Revenge of the Trees"	Dave Willis & Matt Maiellaro	Dave Willis & Matt Maiellaro	October 12, 2003	214
Shake and Carl dump used frying oil into the nearby forest to dispose of it. The trees in the forest attempt revenge and Shake stands trial before the Wood Court.
33	15	"Frat Aliens"	Dave Willis & Matt Maiellaro	Dave Willis & Matt Maiellaro	November 30, 2003	215
Carl has installed an ultra high-tech security system that can be seen from space to keep the Aqua Teens out of his pool, but it instead attracts a pair of drunk alien fraternity brothers. Guest appearance: Patton Oswalt as both D.P. and Skeeter (credited as Shecky Chucklestein).
34	16	"Spirit Journey Formation Anniversary"	Dave Willis & Matt Maiellaro	Dave Willis & Matt Maiellaro	October 19, 2003	216
It's Meatwad's birthday, and Master Shake can't stand "Happy Birthday To You", so he and Geddy Lee write a new song called "Spirit Journey Formation Anniversary" and hire Zakk Wylde to play guitar on it. However, Shake is unable to pay anybody for their work on the song and Zakk is out for revenge. Guest appearances: Zakk Wylde as the song's co-writer.
35	17	"Kidney Car"	Dave Willis & Matt Maiellaro	Dave Willis & Matt Maiellaro	November 16, 2003	217
Master Shake destroys Carl's car in a demolition derby. Carl, having lost hopes, donates it to the Kidney Foundation, and Meatwad gets the car as a freebie given his membership. Shake and Meatwad goof for a while, and try to fix the car. However, things go nowhere given the great damage imposed to the car, their lack of knowledge, and expenses to have it fixed.
36	18	"The Cubing"	Dave Willis & Matt Maiellaro	Dave Willis & Matt Maiellaro	November 23, 2003	218
The Wisdom Cube, a cube from outer space, comes to the Aqua Teens' yard. It claims to have all of the wisdom in the universe, but it does little to reinforce its claim. Shake quickly warms up to him, but soon gets annoyed by his antics. Frylock asks him to solve a paradox, but all the Wisdom Cube says is "Yuh-huh". When they try to go out to the pool, Meatwad rolls back to listen to the cube's outrageous stories. Shake and Frylock discuss if Meatwad is smart enough to get out of the conversations, and in the middle of their conversation, Shake exclaims "For the love of all that's holy, there's another one! " After a small conversation, the second cube apologizes and claims he's the "real" Wisdom Cube and the original cube is his cousin: The Dumbassahedratron. Frylock asks the real cube the paradox, but the cube leaves him with a flaming bag that contains "the answer". After some convincing by Shake and the two cubes, he puts the bag out, only to have his fry covered in dog crap. The real cube tries to convince him if he wants "the final final answer" he should put it in his mouth. The cubes fly up, only to be killed by a passing helicopter. Guest appearances: Jon Schnepp as the first Wisdom cube and Brian Posehn as the second wisdom cube (credited as "Jason Todd")
37	19	"The Shaving"	Dave Willis & Matt Maiellaro	Dave Willis & Matt Maiellaro	October 26, 2003	219
It's Halloween night in South Jersey, and the Aqua Teens are gearing up for the holiday by dressing up...except Master Shake, of course. Frylock is a sailor on the Ship of the Damned, and Meatwad is the Incredible Plum (a take off on the Incredible Hulk, with Meatwad being painted purple). Shake, being the person he is, can't resist making fun of their costumes. While Frylock is finishing getting ready, Shake and Meatwad are met by a creature that's a cross between an onion and a spider, who tries to scare people through use of a triple-head electric razor. The only thing it gets is ridicule from Shake and Frylock. Finally, the onion/spider reveals who he is: his name is Willie Nelson, and he lives in the attic. He's also looking for his mail, which he hasn't gotten for a while. Frylock admits to throwing said mail away, which angers Willie and causes him to throw the Aqua Teens' TV out a window. After making fun of Willie's methods (Shake calls the laid back spider "The Gayest Monster since Gay Came to Gaytown" and says he should star in a musical called "The Texas Chainsaw Mascara"), Shake decides to remake the laid back onion/spider into a killing machine, in the image of a serial killer. During the course of this, Shake has Willie assume the persona of Blood Feast Island Man, and try to scare Carl next door. After Willie fails for the first time, Shake succeeds in scaring Carl by throwing Meatwad at him. Shake's next try to make Willie scary is to have him go next door and threaten Carl with chainsaws, with him saying, "Nice head. I think I'll take it." This fails again, as Willie runs out of luck when his chainsaws become unplugged thanks to the extension cords powering them falling off. When this happens, Carl comes out angrily and asks "What!?" to which he can only reply "What are you doing here?" which Carl answers by saying "I live here, asshole!". Carl then goes back to the Aqua Teens' house and throws Meatwad at Shake, who is flipping out because Willie didn't scare Carl. Shake and Willie decide to go with one final prank to scare Carl. Shake hooks up a huge electrical generator to Carl's door using jumper cables, while Willie is waiting with a cement mixer full of blood to dump on Carl once the electricity shocks him unconscious. However, the plan doesn't go as well as hoped, as Carl scares Shake with Meatwad's Incredible Plum mask, causing Shake to fall into the generator and get the blood poured on him. After going back up to the attic, Frylock informs Willie that he has some of his mail. After Willie urges him to bring it up, we find out the horrible truth about him- he is an actual killer who stores his bodies in the Aqua Teens' attic. Frylock and Shake are instantly horrified, and a late entering Carl gets his arms ripped off by Willie, who drinks his blood and calls it juice. The Aqua Teens run off and seal the attic, presumably locking Willie in there forever (with a screaming Carl). Guest appearance: Tom Scharpling as Willie Nelson
38	20	"The Clowning"	Dave Willis & Matt Maiellaro	Dave Willis & Matt Maiellaro	December 7, 2003	220
Carl shows up at the Aqua Teen's door to reveal that his house is infested with termites. He mutters that he won't sign for any more packages with "Congo" written in blood. Meatwad hurries over to receive a termite of his own. Throughout all this, Carl seems to be level-headed, a trait that he does not usually portray. He reveals that he has gotten a wig, and it cost a substantial amount. Carl is later reading a magazine on how to pick up girls, when Shake suddenly appears in his room. Carl tries to remove the wig and place it upon a mannequin head, but finds it stuck to his head. Carl is distracted by Shake, who is rummaging through his belongings. When Carl leaves, his mannequin head grows fangs and devilish eyes. Carl wakes up to Shake standing in his room. Carl's hair has now changed color from brown to black, and has become much curlier. Shake is quick to anger Carl, and is then thrown out the window. As Carl leaves the room, his mannequin head speaks to a floating head with a clown wig on. They argue, and then part ways as Carl reenters the room. Later that day, Carl brings home a prostitute. The Aqua Teens follow him, and through the holes in Carl's wall, watches as Carl plays an air guitar solo, only to be interrupted by the Aqua Teens. As he steps outside to speak with them, his hair gains more mass and becomes red. After they argue, he proceeds to have sex with the now passed-out prostitute. At the Aqua Teen's house, an examination of Carl's hair reveals that he is infected with Clown DNA. The prostitute runs out screaming, and Carl follows with white skin dotted with purple blotches, a clown nose, huge feet, and a clown car. He goes to the Aqua Teen's house for help. Frylock attempts to cut Carl's hair off, but it only grows back and lands on Meatwad. Meatwad shortly develops the symptoms that Carl had, and Carl walks out with a balloon resembling a shotgun, asking God to kill him. Frylock freezes him until he can find a cure. At the end of this episode (67 years later), an apocalyptic future is depicted, and Carl, being used as a coat rack (and still in a frozen state), is knocked over and presumably killed. The now over-the-hill Aqua Teens struggle to remember Carl's name, and the episode ends with Frylock yelling at Shake and Meatwad exclaiming that he has shattered his hip. After this, we see Dr. Weird proclaim "And that's how the wig works." Steve has been clowned. Dr. Weird has a brief moment of silence looking at the mannequin head and shouts "Stop telling me to do things." and the credits roll.
39	21	"The Dressing"	Dave Willis & Matt Maiellaro	Dave Willis & Matt Maiellaro	December 14, 2003	221
Meatwad rolls over to Carl's with a message, which he is unable to remember due to his limited intelligence, so he roots around in his meat looking for the note he wrote as a reminder, pulling out his dolls Squirrelly and a decapitated Jiggle Billy in the process. Eventually he finds the right note, which is a Thanksgiving invitation. Since they aren't legally US citizens yet, the Aqua Teens have Thanksgiving a week past the actual holiday and invite Carl over to share in the festivities (though Carl decides to have dinner outside for the purpose of having witnesses). However, the dinner is interrupted when a mechanical turkey bursts into the home and grabs Carl by the throat (before tossing him out the window when Frylock asks the turkey to put him down). The turkey says his name is Turkitron and claims to be sent from the year 9595 to save the great-great-great-great grandfather of the turkey "Goblox," who is supposed to save the turkeys from the chicken overlords. Unfortunately, as Frylock points out, the turkey is already dead and about to be served as food. Turkitron then tells a series of long tales about subjects ranging from the chicken overlords to the banning of taco pie to the claim that Carl is, in fact, a chicken mercenary sent from 9595 to stop the mission. All the while, Turkitron downs taco pie and wine, then attempts to find a time rift through which he will travel with the dinner turkey to a time before his killing. The turkey's mannerisms lead the ATHF to believe that this turkey is somehow related to the Cybernetic Ghost of Christmas Past from the Future (which Turkitron admits he took the form of in his first appearance). They also find it odd that he carries all his belongings in a plastic bag, including socks, which Turkitron claims are laser-guided weapons. When Turkitron passes out drunk from the wine (and after destroying the ATHF's television), Frylock ties up the turkey and explores his head with a blowtorch. After Frylock adjusts some crossed wires, Turkitron starts doing the Hustle. Master Shake enters with a newspaper (to show a pantyhose ad), but Frylock discovers an article that states that Turkitron is actually a defective toy called the "Hustlin' Tom Turkey" and that 5,000 were made. At that moment, a large number of turkey robots (perhaps the other 4,999 turkeys) show up at the ATHF's door. Shake directs them to Carl's house, who opens the door while munching on a turkey leg. When asked what it is, Carl begins to say, "This is your great-great-great...", and the turkeys take aim with their laser-guided socks. Just before the turkeys fire on Carl, he says, "You mother-" Guest appearances: Seth Green as himself, and Barry Mills as Hustlin' Tom Turkey.
40	22	"The"	Dave Willis & Matt Maiellaro	Dave Willis & Matt Maiellaro	December 21, 2003	222
Master Shake nearly destroys the house by leaving garbage everywhere and planting land mines all over. He especially trashes Frylock's room, closing up the doorway with bricks and installed a camera system for it to show on the inside the collateral damage he's done to a horrified Frylock. Completely fed up with everything, Frylock abandons his friendship with Shake and moves to a condominium. Without Frylock's stabilizing influence and actions, the house falls into total chaos with Shake burning styrofoam, stockpiling chicken carcasses, abusing and dominating Meatwad. They both, along with Carl, get conjunctivitis in which their eyelids getting so puffy, they can barely see. Guest appearances: Jay Edwards as himself, and a voice cameo from Ned Hastings as himself.
41	23	"The Cloning"	Dave Willis & Matt Maiellaro	Dave Willis & Matt Maiellaro	December 31, 2003	223
Master Shake destroys another TV, which happens to be their last one. Shake and Meatwad then discover that Frylock had been cloning the TVs with his cloner. and tired of doing so he plans to stop. He explains that if something is cloned too many times, the molecular structure begins to break down and unusual events will occur. After Meatwad makes a play for sympathy from Frylock, saying that he can't face the day without his TV, he decides to clone another TV. But true to Frylock's warning, odd things began to happen regarding the TV, and chaos ensues when Shake takes advantage of money with the cloner. Guest appearances: Scott Hilley as George Washington
42	24	"The Last One"	Dave Willis & Matt Maiellaro	Dave Willis & Matt Maiellaro	December 31, 2003	224
The Mooninites have gathered a bunch of their villain friends for one final push towards eliminating the Aqua Teens. However, they do not succeed, and much of their group is eliminated from the meeting. Only the Rabbot, the Mooninites, Mothmonsterman, Happy Time Harry, the Cybernetic Ghost of Christmas Past from the Future, and Major Shake get to South Jersey. They plan to shove "The Screw of Damnation" into the Hunger Force's heads. When the Mooninites were asked how they would get it in there, the Mooninites planned (They planned on having the others do it) on giving the Hunger Force a Post-It note saying "Stay Still." Early on the episode, they decide to make a cool group name. The brownies suggest "Click-Click-Click-Click..." and they finally settle on the Rabbot's idea, "Monday Tuesday Wednesday Thursday Friday Saturday Sunday..." Meanwhile, the Plutonians, who were not invited because they were "teh s uck", have formed their own group consisting of them and a headless Jiggle Billy. Guest appearances: Todd Field as Ol' Drippy, H. Jon Benjamin as Mothmonsterman, Jon Glaser as Oog, Isaac Hayes III as Broodwich, Scott Hilley as Flargon, Matt Harrigan as Major Shake, Jon Schnepp as Cube, David Cross as Happy Time Harry (credited as Sir Willups Brightslymoore), Patton Oswalt as D. P. and Skeeter (credited as Shecky Chucklestein), Brooks Braselman as Travis, and Todd Barry as Romulox.

== Home release ==
The first eleven episodes from season two were released on the Aqua Teen Hunger Force Volume Two DVD on July 20, 2004, along with two final episodes from season one. The remaining episodes were released on the Aqua Teen Hunger Force Volume Three DVD on November 16, 2004. Both sets were distributed by Adult Swim and Warner Home Video and feature various special features including the Space Ghost Coast to Coast episode "Baffler Meal", which introduced early rough-cut versions of the main characters on the Volume Two set, and commentaries and deleted scenes on select episodes on both sets. Both sets were later released in Region 4 by Madman Entertainment on November 7, 2007, and August 6, 2008, respectively. In Region 2 the Volume Two set was released on December 7, 2009, and the Volume Three set was released on January 25, 2010 The Volume Two set was also released as part of the Adult Swim in a Box set on October 27, 2009.

Season two is also available on iTunes and the Xbox Live Marketplace. The second half of the seasons' release on iTunes and Xbox Live is labeled as season three. This season was also released on Amazon Video, in two parts under the labels "Volume Two" and "Volume Three".

Aqua Teen Hunger Force Volume Two
Set details			Special features
13 episodes; 2-disc set; 1.33:1 aspect ratio; Languages: English; English subtitles; Spanish subtitles; French subtitles			Audio commentary: "Super Trivia"; "The Meat Zone"; "Cybernetic Ghost of Christmas Past from the Future"; Deleted Scenes: "Super Model"; "Cybernetic Ghost of Christmas Past from the Future"; "Baffler Meal"; "Super Birthday Snake'; "Baffler Meal" (Space Ghost Coast to Coast episode); "Baffler Meal" music video; "Baffler Meal" audio commentary; Future Wolf II: Never Cry Wolf: Origin of the series; Future Wolf III; Photo gallery
Release date			Audio commentary: "Super Trivia"; "The Meat Zone"; "Cybernetic Ghost of Christmas Past from the Future"; Deleted Scenes: "Super Model"; "Cybernetic Ghost of Christmas Past from the Future"; "Baffler Meal"; "Super Birthday Snake'; "Baffler Meal" (Space Ghost Coast to Coast episode); "Baffler Meal" music video; "Baffler Meal" audio commentary; Future Wolf II: Never Cry Wolf: Origin of the series; Future Wolf III; Photo gallery
Region 1	Region 2	Region 4	Audio commentary: "Super Trivia"; "The Meat Zone"; "Cybernetic Ghost of Christmas Past from the Future"; Deleted Scenes: "Super Model"; "Cybernetic Ghost of Christmas Past from the Future"; "Baffler Meal"; "Super Birthday Snake'; "Baffler Meal" (Space Ghost Coast to Coast episode); "Baffler Meal" music video; "Baffler Meal" audio commentary; Future Wolf II: Never Cry Wolf: Origin of the series; Future Wolf III; Photo gallery
July 20, 2004	December 7, 2009	November 7, 2007	Audio commentary: "Super Trivia"; "The Meat Zone"; "Cybernetic Ghost of Christmas Past from the Future"; Deleted Scenes: "Super Model"; "Cybernetic Ghost of Christmas Past from the Future"; "Baffler Meal"; "Super Birthday Snake'; "Baffler Meal" (Space Ghost Coast to Coast episode); "Baffler Meal" music video; "Baffler Meal" audio commentary; Future Wolf II: Never Cry Wolf: Origin of the series; Future Wolf III; Photo gallery

Aqua Teen Hunger Force Volume Three
Set details			Special features
13 episodes; 2-disc set; 1.33:1 aspect ratio; Languages: English; English subtitles; Spanish subtitles; French subtitles			Audio commentary: "Spirit Journey Formation Anniversary"; "The Shaving"; "The Clowning"; "The Last One"; Deleted scenes: Broodwich; Dr. Weird's Ice Cream Social; Alternative ending for "The Clowning"; Photo gallery; Promotional spots; Documentary on the making of "The Cloning"; Character answering machine messages; Music videos and karaoke for "Spirit Journey Formation Anniversary"
Release date			Audio commentary: "Spirit Journey Formation Anniversary"; "The Shaving"; "The Clowning"; "The Last One"; Deleted scenes: Broodwich; Dr. Weird's Ice Cream Social; Alternative ending for "The Clowning"; Photo gallery; Promotional spots; Documentary on the making of "The Cloning"; Character answering machine messages; Music videos and karaoke for "Spirit Journey Formation Anniversary"
Region 1	Region 2	Region 4	Audio commentary: "Spirit Journey Formation Anniversary"; "The Shaving"; "The Clowning"; "The Last One"; Deleted scenes: Broodwich; Dr. Weird's Ice Cream Social; Alternative ending for "The Clowning"; Photo gallery; Promotional spots; Documentary on the making of "The Cloning"; Character answering machine messages; Music videos and karaoke for "Spirit Journey Formation Anniversary"
November 16, 2004	January 25, 2010	August 6, 2008	Audio commentary: "Spirit Journey Formation Anniversary"; "The Shaving"; "The Clowning"; "The Last One"; Deleted scenes: Broodwich; Dr. Weird's Ice Cream Social; Alternative ending for "The Clowning"; Photo gallery; Promotional spots; Documentary on the making of "The Cloning"; Character answering machine messages; Music videos and karaoke for "Spirit Journey Formation Anniversary"

== See also ==
- List of Aqua Teen Hunger Force episodes
- Aqua Teen Hunger Force
