= Aqua Teen Hunger Force season 4 =

Aqua Teen Hunger Force
- Season 4
- Volume Five DVD cover, which features the entire fourth season
- Starring: Dana Snyder; Carey Means; Dave Willis

Release
- Original network: Adult Swim
- Original release: December 4, 2005 – December 22, 2006

Season chronology
- ← Previous; Season 3 Next → Season 5

The fourth season of the animated television series, Aqua Teen Hunger Force originally aired in the United States on Cartoon Network's late night programming block, Adult Swim. Season four started on December 4, 2005 with "Dirtfoot" and ended with "Carl Wash" on December 22, 2006. Aqua Teen Hunger Force is about the surreal adventures and antics of three anthropomorphic fast food items: Master Shake, Frylock, and Meatwad, who live together as roommates and frequently interact with their human next-door neighbor, Carl in a suburban neighborhood in South New Jersey. In May 2015, this season became available on Hulu Plus.

This is the final season to air before the 2007 release Aqua Teen Hunger Force Colon Movie Film for Theaters, a feature-length film based on the series. Episodes in season four were written and directed by Dave Willis and Matt Maiellaro. Almost every episode in this season features a special guest appearance, which continues a practice used in past seasons.

== Production ==
Every episode in this season was written and directed by series creators Dave Willis and Matt Maiellaro, who have both written and directed every episode of the series. All episodes originally aired in the United States on Cartoon Network's late night programming block, Adult Swim. This season was one of the original seasons branded under the Aqua Teen Hunger Force title before Willis and Maiellaro started using a different alternative title for each season in 2011. As with most seasons, several episodes originally aired outside of their production order.

Season four features "Deleted Scenes", the first 22-minute episode, which features several references to the feature-length film Aqua Teen Hunger Force Colon Movie Film for Theaters, which aired on December 18, 2005, years prior to the film's debut. This season also features "Grim Reaper Gutters,” which is the first clip-show for Aqua Teen Hunger Force; as well as the show's first TV-MA-rated episode ("Dickesode") and the first appearances of Dr. Wongburger and Handbanana.

Many episodes in season four were made during the late production of the Aqua Teen Hunger Force Colon Movie Film for Theaters and were spaced out more than any other season. Season four is the final season to air before the movie, the final season produced in 4:3 standard definition, and the final season to air when Jim Samples was running Cartoon Network (he resigned following the 2007 Boston Bomb Scare, when the series got national attention).

== Cast ==
=== Main ===
- Dana Snyder as Master Shake
- Carey Means as Frylock
- Dave Willis as Meatwad, Carl, Ignignokt, Handbanana and Spaghetti

=== Recurring ===
- Matt Maiellaro as Err and Cybernetic Ghost of Christmas Past from the Future
- George Lowe as himself
- Andy Merrill as Oglethorpe
- Mike Schatz as Emory

=== Guest appearances ===
In season four the main cast consisted of Dana Snyder who provided the voice of Master Shake, Carey Means who provided the voice of Frylock, and series co-creator Dave Willis who provided the voice of both Meatwad and Carl; and recurring character Ignignokt. Also featured appearances from Matt Maiellaro who as Err and Cybernetic Ghost of Christmas Past from the Future, George Lowe who as himself as various characters, Brendon Small as Dr. Wongburger, Andy Merrill who as Oglethorpe and a Rice Minion, and Mike Schatz who as Emory.

Season four featured various guest appearances from Billie Reaves in "Dirtfoot", Mike Bigga as Boost in "Boost Mobile", Tommy Blacha appeared in "Dickesode", Andrew W.K. as himself in "Party All the Time", Roberto Lange as Mucus man in "Global Grilling", and Tera Patrick as herself in "Grim Reaper Gutters", Bart Oates as himself in "Bart Oates", Patton Oswalt as Ezekial in "Ezekial". In "Carl Wash" Jim Fortier as both Carl and his son Carl Jr., both characters had originally appeared in the 1999 Space Ghost Coast to Coast episode "Chambraigne".

=== Broadcast history ===
"Carl Wash" was originally scheduled to air on January 7, 2007, but was aired early and without announcement on December 22, 2006 during the 3:30 a.m. time slot. It was played once more on January 21, before Adult Swim officially aired this episode on March 25, 2007. The earlier broadcasts included a rough audio track, whereas the later, "official" airing contained finished audio. Also, on the original version, parts of the screen were not shown, such as, when Meatwad is talking to the brains, in the finished version, Carl Jr. is entirely shown, however, in the rough version, part of Carl Jr. is not shown.

== Episodes ==
No. overall	No. in season	Title	Directed by	Written by	Original release date	Prod. code
56	1	"Dirtfoot"	Dave Willis & Matt Maiellaro	Dave Willis & Matt Maiellaro	December 4, 2005	401
Master Shake pretends to fall down a well in an attempt to pick up girls. Guest appearance: Billie Reaves
57	2	"Boost Mobile"	Dave Willis & Matt Maiellaro	Dave Willis & Matt Maiellaro	December 11, 2005	402
Frylock becomes angry when he sees that the Aqua Teens have an electric bill for $2,600, and discovers that Shake caused the high fee by charging an anthropomorphic over-sized cell phone that he got from Boost Mobile (now a subsidiary of Dish Network, formerly EchoStar) in exchange for advertising the company, which he does whenever the camera is on him. Shake says that Josh threatens to castrate him if he loses the phone after Frylock tries to get rid of it, so he devises a smarter plan to destroy it. Guest appearances: Killer Mike and Schoolly D as the Boost Mobile phones.
58	3	"Deleted Scenes" "Star Studded Xmas Spectacular" "Star Studded Christmas Spectacular Starring Rhon Geremi"	Dave Willis & Matt Maiellaro	Dave Willis & Matt Maiellaro	December 18, 2005	403
In this episode, Shake and Meatwad show some scenes from Untitled Master Shake Project. Shake claims that the movie has no plot, and that viewers were disgusted when they saw it at the Mall Of America. Aqua Teens and Carl go to the Aqua Teens house, where Carl has recovered. He tells them that he mentally lost at least 2 days. Meatwad pulls the broom out of his ass quickly. After the movie ends, Carl is confused as to why the broom's still in his ass when he saw that Meatwad pulled it out with Shake's excuse it was done for reshoots. Carl returns and threatens him with a shotgun
59	4	"Dickesode"	Dave Willis & Matt Maiellaro	Dave Willis & Matt Maiellaro	October 22, 2006	404
Carl and the Aqua Teens partake in a restaurant's promotion called "Rip-n-Win," which consists of ripping the bottom of fountain drink cups for a prize. While Shake and Meatwad both get a coupon for Wasabi Fries, Carl's prize reads "Tonight, you will get your dick ripped off.” The "prize" is said to be real from a TV commercial via disclaimer, and with the restaurant employees tracking down the "winner," the Aqua Teens must protect Carl by any means necessary, only to discover that Mr. Wongburger orchestrated the entire plan, having gathered mountains of penises to build a rocket ship just to get back to his home planet. Guest appearances: Tommy Blacha (credited as Dick Blacha), Brendon Small (credited as Dick Small in the original airing, credited as Donald Cock in later airings), and Andy Merrill (credited as "Dick Merrill") Notes: For the end credits, everyone's first name is replaced with "dick”. In later airings, Brendon Small's credit was changed to "Donald Cock”. Dr. Wongburger makes his first appearance in this episode. This episode has a censored and uncensored version, both of which appear on DVD. This is the first episode of ATHF to be rated TV-MA in the United States.
60	5	"Handbanana"	Dave Willis & Matt Maiellaro	Dave Willis & Matt Maiellaro	October 29, 2006	405
Frylock genetically engineers a dog for Meatwad using the "Make Your Own Dog 1.0" software with Carl's pool, which Master Shake accidentally activates by flopping his hand in the pool, resulting in a hand-shaped dog who Meatwad names "Handbanana.” Unbeknownst to the Aqua Teens, Handbanana can speak, which only Carl can hear. The engineered pet is interested in raping Carl, and after a failed attempt to convince the Aqua Teens of their dog's language and violations, Carl must figure out how to deal with Handbanana himself.
61	6	"Party All the Time"	Dave Willis & Matt Maiellaro	Dave Willis & Matt Maiellaro	November 5, 2006	406
Frylock has a protrusion on his face, and after a concerned Master Shake and Meatwad convince him to see a doctor about it, he learns from the doctor that he has cancer. As times goes by, Frylock appears more sicker each day and depressed. The Aqua Teens and Carl become very worried for him, so they do everything they can to cheer him up. Guest appearances: Eugene Mirman as Dr. Eugene Mirman, Andrew W.K. as himself.
62	7	"Bart Oates"	Dave Willis & Matt Maiellaro	Dave Willis & Matt Maiellaro	December 3, 2006	407
Meatwad and Master Shake call Frylock late at night, having been thrown in jail for a D.U.I. while driving Carl's car. The next morning, Carl discovers his car missing, finds a post-it note on the curb saying "Thanks for car, M.S.,” and tries to peddle shoddy Giants uniforms he commissioned to be made to Frylock. Later in Carl's room, Bart Oates appears, much to Carl's excitement. Carl recounts his stats and the many games of Oates' he watched, then reveals how he had hoped Oates would become injured after he transferred to the 49ers. Guest appearance: Bart Oates as himself.
63	8	"Global Grilling"	Dave Willis & Matt Maiellaro	Dave Willis & Matt Maiellaro	November 12, 2006	408
Master Shake and Meatwad try to make a "Mucus Man" out of mucus, with Shake doing the spitting. The duo are frustrated at their lack of progress, with Shake stating he's out of snot to produce any more mucus. After a failed attempt to get sick and Frylock failing to help with cost-efficient methods, Shake buys the Char-Nobyl 6000, an illegally imported, extremely powerful barbecue grill with a nuclear core made of radioactive waste to speed up the build of Mucus Man. However, after turning it on, the core activates and the grill cannot be turned off safely, and disasters strike New Jersey as the world heats up. Guest appearance: Roberto Lange as Mucus Man
64	9	"Grim Reaper Gutters"	Dave Willis & Matt Maiellaro	Dave Willis & Matt Maiellaro	November 19, 2006	409
Master Shake and Meatwad sitting around, reminiscing about past events. They eventually stray off topic into more extravagant tales, like how Hugh Hefner invited Shake to the Playboy mansion, concerned on how there were too few guys. Frylock reminds the two of how many times he's saved their lives, accompanied by a clip montage mostly of him doing just that from past episodes accompanied by Andrew W.K.'s song from the episode "Party All the Time". Shake tries to counter this by talking about how he picked out Frylock's computer for him, but fails to mention how he ran off to Mexico when the bill arrived. Guest appearance: Tera Patrick.
65	10	"Moonajuana"	Dave Willis & Matt Maiellaro	Dave Willis & Matt Maiellaro	November 26, 2006	410
Frylock and Meatwad are playing checkers in the Aqua Teens' living room. Master Shake enters and announces he has bad glaucoma, and that his doctor said he needs to smoke marijuana to help him get better. The Mooninites arrive and say they grow marijuana on the Moon (called 'moonajuana'), at first to battle their own crippling illnesses, but now simply for recreation. Against Frylock's wishes, Shake and Meatwad go off with Ignignokt and Err to get stoned. A man with questionable intent then approaches Err and several other gay prostitutes shortly before opening fire on the group with an uzi.
66	11	"Ezekial"	Dave Willis & Matt Maiellaro	Dave Willis & Matt Maiellaro	December 17, 2006	411
A small milkshake, looking just like Master Shake, arrives at the Aqua Teen's house, calling Shake "Daddy." Shake is very resistant to him, avoiding and berating him to avoid having to take care of him. Before the little milkshake could run away to Reno, Frylock allows him to stay until he's old enough to live independently, with Meatwad naming him Ezekial. The Aqua Teens partake in activities with Ezekial to bond with him, but Shake bullies him, much to the others' disapproval. Guest appearance: Patton Oswalt as Ezekial (credited as "Shecky Chucklestein").
67	12	"Antenna"	Dave Willis & Matt Maiellaro	Dave Willis & Matt Maiellaro	December 10, 2006	412
After two aliens build a large antenna attached to Carl's house, Carl and the Aqua Teens are enticed into watching the show the aliens broadcast - a show wherein the aliens do nothing but move the same boxes back and forth - despite their swelling heads and constant nosebleeds. Guest appearances: Mike Judge and Will Forte as The Nutty Bunch, Erik & Larry. George Lowe as himself
68	13	"Carl Wash"	Dave Willis & Matt Maiellaro	Dave Willis & Matt Maiellaro	December 21, 2006 (stealth, unfinished); March 25, 2007 (official)	413
Meatwad responds to an ad in the newspaper and gets a job at "Carl's Car Wash," standing out on the highway in front of it waving and dancing to attract business (but only gets cups full of coke thrown at him). Meatwad gets some help from Frylock in trying some new shapes, but eventually gives up. He instead takes Master Shake's advice and tries unsuccessfully to antagonize their neighbor Carl into getting his car washed, by turning into a fist extending his middle finger then asking if he is a dumbass who's gonna get his ass whupped. Carl and Carl Jr. arrive and, after pointing out that he, his son. Note: This is the last episode to premiere and take place events before the Aqua Teen Hunger Force Colon Movie Film for Theaters.

== Home release ==
The entire fourth season was released on the Aqua Teen Hunger Force Volume Five DVD on January 29, 2008. The set was released by Adult Swim and distributed by Warner Home Video, and features special features including the online video game The Worst Game Ever, and deleted scenes. The set was later released in Region 4 by Madman Entertainment on April 1, 2009. The set was released in Region 2 on January 31, 2011. "Deleted Scenes" was also released as a special feature on the Aqua Teen Hunger Force Colon Movie Film for DVD set along with the movie on August 14, 2007.

With the exception of "Deleted Scenes", this season was also released under the label "Season 5" on iTunes, the Xbox Live Marketplace, and Amazon Video under the label "Volume 5". The iTunes release also features a special music video, "I Like Your Booty But I'm Not Gay".

Aqua Teen Hunger Force Volume Five
Set details			Special features
13 episodes; 2-disc set; 1.33:1 aspect ratio; Languages: English; Subtitles: English; Spanish			"I Like Your Booty (But I'm Not Gay)" music video (iTunes bonus); Aqua Teen Responds to the Critics; Learn to Shred Like the Master; Tera Patrick Eats a Hot Dog; Granny Takes Her Top Off; The Worst Game Ever (interactive DVD game); "Chambraigne" (Space Ghost Coast to Coast episode); Aqua Teen Hunger Force Colon Movie Film for Theaters premiere with Space Ghost; Deleted Scenes; Favorite Episode Promos; Aqua Teen Hunger Force Zombie Ninja Pro-Am (video game trailer); "Dickesode" uncensored
Release dates			"I Like Your Booty (But I'm Not Gay)" music video (iTunes bonus); Aqua Teen Responds to the Critics; Learn to Shred Like the Master; Tera Patrick Eats a Hot Dog; Granny Takes Her Top Off; The Worst Game Ever (interactive DVD game); "Chambraigne" (Space Ghost Coast to Coast episode); Aqua Teen Hunger Force Colon Movie Film for Theaters premiere with Space Ghost; Deleted Scenes; Favorite Episode Promos; Aqua Teen Hunger Force Zombie Ninja Pro-Am (video game trailer); "Dickesode" uncensored
Region 1	Region 2	Region 4	"I Like Your Booty (But I'm Not Gay)" music video (iTunes bonus); Aqua Teen Responds to the Critics; Learn to Shred Like the Master; Tera Patrick Eats a Hot Dog; Granny Takes Her Top Off; The Worst Game Ever (interactive DVD game); "Chambraigne" (Space Ghost Coast to Coast episode); Aqua Teen Hunger Force Colon Movie Film for Theaters premiere with Space Ghost; Deleted Scenes; Favorite Episode Promos; Aqua Teen Hunger Force Zombie Ninja Pro-Am (video game trailer); "Dickesode" uncensored
January 29, 2008	January 31, 2011	April 1, 2009	"I Like Your Booty (But I'm Not Gay)" music video (iTunes bonus); Aqua Teen Responds to the Critics; Learn to Shred Like the Master; Tera Patrick Eats a Hot Dog; Granny Takes Her Top Off; The Worst Game Ever (interactive DVD game); "Chambraigne" (Space Ghost Coast to Coast episode); Aqua Teen Hunger Force Colon Movie Film for Theaters premiere with Space Ghost; Deleted Scenes; Favorite Episode Promos; Aqua Teen Hunger Force Zombie Ninja Pro-Am (video game trailer); "Dickesode" uncensored

== See also ==
- List of Aqua Teen Hunger Force episodes
- Aqua Teen Hunger Force
