= Adult Swim Brain Trust =

2004 American adult animated television special

- Space Ghost interviewing Meatwad, Early Cuyler and Sharko.
- Based on: Characters by Williams Street
- Written by: Jim Fortier; Matt Harrigan; Matt Maiellaro; Pete Smith; Matt Thompson; Dave Willis
- Voices of: (See Voice cast)
- Country of origin: United States
- Original language: English

Production
- Executive producers: Keith Crofford; Mike Lazzo
- Editors: Ned Hastings; John Brestan; Jay Edwards
- Running time: 11 minutes
- Production company: Williams Street

Original release
- Network: Adult Swim
- Release: November 7, 2004

Related
- Space Ghost Coast to Coast; Squidbillies; Aqua Teen Hunger Force; Sealab 2021; Perfect Hair Forever

Adult Swim Brain Trust (also known as Anime Talk Show) is an adult animated television special that aired on Cartoon Network's late night programming block, Adult Swim, on November 7, 2004. The special revolves around the unofficial pilot for Squidbillies. Prior to its GameTap revival, it was often considered the last episode of Space Ghost Coast to Coast since it follows the same format as the show, with Space Ghost interviewing guests. The short was dubbed "Anime Talk Show" due to it following the premiere of Perfect Hair Forever, which aired in place of what was supposed to have been the premiere of Squidbillies. It was given the official name Adult Swim Brain Trust when it was uploaded to YouTube and the Adult Swim website in 2012.

Adult Swim Brain Trust was released as a special feature on the Squidbillies Volume One DVD on October 16, 2007. The special was also available on Adult Swim's YouTube channel before it went private.

== Plot ==
Adult Swim Brain Trust features Space Ghost of Space Ghost Coast to Coast and Cartoon Planet hosting a focus group discussion about the unofficial pilot of Squidbillies with Meatwad from Aqua Teen Hunger Force, Early Cuyler from Squidbillies, and Sharko from Sealab 2021. The Cybernetic Ghost of Christmas Past from the Future from Aqua Teen Hunger Force makes a cameo as a caller. Zorak and "Dad" from The Brak Show also appear after being shot by Early. Throughout the special, Space Ghost attempts to interview his guests, but they do not cooperate. After unsuccessfully attempting to perform the interview, Space Ghost is shot by Sharko, who is eventually killed by Early. The special ends with the set in ruins and Early shooting the talking head of Space Ghost off of Meatwad, while a bear eats Sharko's dead body in the background.

== Cast ==
Name	Character(s)
George Lowe	Space Ghost
Unknown Hinson	Early Cuyler
Dave Willis	Meatwad
Matt Thompson	Sharko
Matt Harrigan	Barry
Matt Maiellaro	Cybernetic Ghost of Christmas Past from the Future
Pete Smith	Kevin

== See also ==
- Space Ghost Coast to Coast
- List of Space Ghost Coast to Coast episodes
