= Aqua Teen Hunger Force season 1 =

Aqua Teen Hunger Force
- Season 1
- Volumes 1 and 2 DVD covers. Volume One features the first sixteen episodes, and Volume Two features the final two season one episodes.
- Starring: Dana Snyder; Carey Means; Dave Willis; C. Martin Croker
- No. of episodes: 18

Release
- Original network: Cartoon Network ("Rabbot"); Adult Swim
- Original release: December 30, 2000 – December 29, 2002

Season chronology
- Next → Season 2

The first season of the animated television series, Aqua Teen Hunger Force originally aired in the United States. Season one unofficially started on December 30, 2000 with the unannounced early morning stealth airing of "Rabbot" on Cartoon Network. Season one officially began one week after the official launch of Adult Swim, on September 9, 2001 with "Escape from Leprechaupolis", and ended with "Cybernetic Ghost of Christmas Past from the Future" on December 29, 2002, with a total of eighteen episodes. Aqua Teen Hunger Force is about the surreal adventures and antics of three anthropomorphic fast food items: Master Shake, Frylock, and Meatwad, who live together as roommates and frequently interact with their human next-door neighbor, Carl in a suburban neighborhood in South New Jersey. In late March 2013, this season became available on Netflix. In May 2015, this season became available on Hulu Plus. In May 2020, this season became available on HBO Max.

Season one marks the first appearance of the main characters, and several recurring characters as well. Episodes in season one were written and directed by Dave Willis and Matt Maiellaro. Almost every episode in this season features a special guest appearance, which is later continued in later seasons. This season has been made available on DVD, and other forms of home media, including on demand streaming.

== Production ==
All episodes in season one were written and directed by series creators Dave Willis and Matt Maiellaro. The first episode from this season, "Rabbot" originally aired in the United States on Cartoon Network, unannounced, on December 30, 2000. The remaining episodes from this season originally aired on Cartoon Network's late night programming block, Adult Swim. As with most seasons, several episodes aired outside of their production order. This season was one of the original seasons produced under the Aqua Teen Hunger Force title before Willis and Maiellaro started using alternative titles for each season in 2011.

Season one marks the first official appearances of Master Shake, Frylock, and Meatwad, who originated from the then-unproduced Space Ghost Coast to Coast episode "Baffler Meal" which features their intended designs and personalities. This season also marks the first appearance of their next door neighbor, Carl, as well as a number of recurring characters such as Dr. Weird, Steve, Ignignokt, Err, Oglethorpe, Emory, MC Pee Pants, Cybernetic Ghost of Christmas Past from the Future, and George Lowe.

The first three episodes of season one feature Master Shake, Frylock, and Meatwad as detectives. After three episodes, this premise and the use of the name by the characters were dropped. The premise was a trick that had been added to appease Cartoon Network executives, who "didn't want to air a show about food just going around and doing random stuff". In the show itself, Frylock mentions that they stopped fighting crime because "that wasn't making us a whole lot of money". This premise was later revisited in the season eight two-part episode "Allen".

== Cast ==
=== Main ===
- Dana Snyder as Master Shake
- Carey Means as Frylock
- Dave Willis as Meatwad, Carl and Ignignokt
- C. Martin Croker as Dr. Weird and Steve

=== Recurring ===
- Matt Maiellaro as Err, Satan and Cybernetic Ghost of Christmas Past from the Future
- George Lowe as himself (as a DJ)
- MC Chris as MC Pee Pants and young Carl
- Andy Merrill as Oglethorpe and Merle
- Mike Schatz as Emory

=== Guest appearances ===
- Scott Hilley as Flargon in "Escape from Leprechaupolis"
- H. Jon Benjamin as Mothmonsterman in "Bus of the Undead"
- Don Kennedy as Assisted Living Dracula in "Bus of the Undead" (live-action)
- Todd Field as Ol' Drippy in "Ol' Drippy"
- David Cross as Happy Time Harry in "Dumber Dolls"
- Matt Harrigan voiced Major Shake in "Bad Replicant"
- Tom Clark as Love Mummy in "Love Mummy"
- Todd Hanson as Wwwyzzerdd in "Interfection".
- Todd Barry as Romulox in "PDA"
- Vishal Roney as an Insurance Adjuster in "PDA"
- Rita McGrath as Svetlana in "Mail Order Bride"
- Glenn Danzig as himself in "Cybernetic Ghost of Christmas Past from the Future"

== Broadcast history ==
An unfinished version of "Rabbot" originally aired unannounced at 5:00 am on December 30, 2000 on Cartoon Network, several months before the official launch of Adult Swim. The version that aired on December 30, 2000 featured scenes from the original pitch pilot but were eventually cut from the official version of the episode. Unlike the original version of the pilot, the December 30, 2000 airing was more and rendered completely. "Rabbot" was not re aired until the final cut made its official television debut on September 16, 2001 on Adult Swim in the United States, only three weeks after Adult Swim launched on September 2, 2001. The series had already made its official television debut a week earlier with the second episode "Escape from Leprechaupolis" on September 9, 2001.

== Episodes ==
No. overall	No. in season	Title	Directed by	Written by	Original release date	Prod. code
1	1	"Rabbot"	Dave Willis & Matt Maiellaro	Dave Willis & Matt Maiellaro	December 30, 2000 (on Cartoon Network); September 16, 2001 (on Adult Swim)	101
Dr. Weird builds a titanic robotic rabbit, which spritzes everything it does not smash (such as the Powerpuff Mall and, more importantly, Carl's car) with a hair-growing formula. It is up to the Aqua Teens to stop this menace, though Master Shake is not as enthusiastic about this mission as he first seemed.
2	2	"Escape from Leprechaupolis"	Dave Willis & Matt Maiellaro	Dave Willis & Matt Maiellaro	September 9, 2001	102
Dr. Weird builds a machine which shoots massive rainbows that can grab people and throw them violently, but it is mysteriously stolen during a blackout. The culprits are three leprechauns, who concoct a nefarious plot to send people e-mails promising gold if they go to a local park and step into the rainbow; the rainbow then sucks up the victim, where the leprechauns can mug them for their "treasure" (even though they mostly steal junk and shoes). The Aqua Teens get involved when both Frylock and Carl receive the phony e-mails; Carl falls for the trick and has his gold chain stolen. Eventually, Frylock defeats the leprechauns with his eye lasers, while Meatwad delivers a bizarre speech about rainbows not being made from rainbows, but "happy thoughts, dreams," and various candy. Guest appearance: Scott Hilley as Flargon
3	3	"Bus of the Undead"	Dave Willis & Matt Maiellaro	Dave Willis & Matt Maiellaro	September 30, 2001	103
Mothmonsterman escapes from Dr. Weird's lair and is drawn to the Aqua Teens' house by lights. It turns out the lights are the "Shake Signal" which Master Shake is wearing on his head while watching "Assisted Living Dracula". Mothmonsterman threatens trouble for the Aqua Teens if they don't leave their lights on. Master Shake suspects that the school bus from which Mothmonsterman is calling them is actually possessed by Dracula's ghost. Frylock attempts to discover who is threatening them by putting the flag that Mothmonsterman destroyed in his cloner. Eventually, though, Frylock decides to prove to Master Shake that the bus is not Dracula by taking him to Dracula's grave. When the Aqua Teens return home they find Mothmonsterman in their house watching "Assisted Living Dracula"; he has encased Carl in a cocoon and laid a thousand eggs in his esophagus, and Carl is "being a real baby about it". Shortly thereafter the house is taken over by cloned monsters created when Shake threw a pan of brownies into the cloner, where they spliced with the moth DNA to form Brownie Monsters. Guest appearance: Jon Benjamin as Mothmonsterman, Don Kennedy as Assisted Living Dracula (live action), Mary Kraft as Assisted Living Dracula's nurse (live action).
4	4	"Mayhem of the Mooninites"	Dave Willis & Matt Maiellaro	Dave Willis & Matt Maiellaro	October 14, 2001	104
A pixelated purple ship lands in the street in front of Carl and the Aqua Teens' houses. Two short, square-shaped, pixelated aliens exit the ship and knock on Carl's door. They identify themselves as Ignignokt and Err, Mooninites from the inner core of the Moon and members of a race hundreds of years advanced from the people of the Earth. Carl slams the door in their face and the Mooninites decide to go next door to the Aqua Teens' house, where a sign on the lawn says there is a room for rent. In their house, Master Shake explains to Meatwad that he is renting out Meatwad's room in order to make money. Shake answers the door and the Mooninites enter. As references, they spin in place and glow. Shake gives them the room. Shakes asks for a deposit, and they spin in place and glow some more. Shake asks for something more substantial, and Ignignokt offers Meatwad's jambox. Shake accepts. Meatwad complains to the Mooninites about Shake, and they show him how to shoot the bird and smoke cigarettes. Later, after swimming in Carl's pool, they attempt to dry a wet towel over Frylock's computer. Frylock is unhappy to learn that Shake has rented them Meatwad's room. Frylock suspiciously questions the Mooninites and he is not impressed. When Meatwad rolls out of his room smoking a cigarette and asking for alcohol, Frylock is even more incensed. Shake breaks out an electric guitar and says that the Mooninites gave it to him. Meatwad goes with the Mooninites to the mall, where Ignignokt and Err spit in Meatwad's face until he steals a rack of DVDs while the Mooninites steal televisions and stereo equipment. Frylock must retrieve Meatwad from mall security, while the Mooninites make it back safely and mention that they have gouged expletives into Carl's car. Carl is angry. On the way back to their house, Meatwad shows Frylock his tough new clown tattoo. In Carl's pool, Shake and the Mooninites see who can hold their breath underwater the longest. Carl comes outside and complains about the vandalism to his car, and Ignignokt takes out "Mr. Laser", a pixelated pistol-like gun. He fires a shot at Carl, but it moves extremely slowly. Carl easily moves out of the way and dodges it, but it bounces off his house and hits him in the back, causing him to disappear. Frylock hovers to the pool, surprising Master Shake. They all go back into the Aqua Teens' house, and while everyone watches a movie on the television about "Vegetable Man", Frylock tells the Mooninites he wants them to move out. When everyone ignores him, Frylock destroys the television with energy balls from his eyes. The Mooninites are initially impressed by how fast the balls move, but then pretend that the balls were actually primitive. Frylock and the Mooninites takes their dispute outside, where Frylock uses his fries to plaster their flat two-dimensional bodies against the road. Meatwad rolls outside and shoves Frylock off of them, saying that the Mooninites are his friends. When Err extinguishes a cigarette in Meatwad's eye, Meatwad realizes they may not be his friends after all. Ignignokt then utters the words "Mooninites unite", and the smaller Err joins into an Err-shaped slot in the top of Ignignokt, forming the "Quad Laser", wherein each of their arms holds a pixelated pistol-like gun. After stating that no one can defeat it, the Mooninites fire, shooting an even larger, even slower bullet than before. In response, Frylock shoots them with his energy balls, and the Mooninites quickly flee "this primitive rock" in their ship. Back on their ship, the Mooninites raise their middle fingers at the shrinking Earth. At Carl's pool, Shake says he will keep all of the Mooninites' stolen merchandise, because he deserves it. Having landed in a crater on the Moon, the Mooninites find Carl and threaten him with a "Moon spanking". Guest appearance: Don Kennedy as Vegetable Man (live action). Note: This is the first ATHF episode to be rated TV-14.
5	5	"Balloonenstein"	Dave Willis & Matt Maiellaro	Dave Willis & Matt Maiellaro	December 23, 2001	105
In the opening, Carl is admiring his pool (completely decked out with painted flames and neon lights) and preventing Master Shake from getting anywhere near it because he is weird. Suddenly, a black hole appears in the sky and begins to suck up Carl. Frylock tries to help by tying a garden hose around his waist and having Shake hold on to it, but Shake ties it to a loosely-fitted gutter, and Frylock and Carl are sucked into the vortex. Inside the house, Shake tricks Meatwad into climbing inside the dryer. When Frylock escapes the vortex (along with Carl, whose hands have grown greatly), he finds Shake inside and berates him for not holding the hose. When the dryer stops and Meatwad exits, he discovers he now has magical static powers (which he promptly uses to send Shake into midair, finally letting him go near the ceiling fan). While mainly using his shots of electricity to torment Shake, he does cause a great deal of harm: he shorts out Frylock's computer, jumps into Carl's pool (while Carl had his hand in it, blasting him across the yard and electrocuting him), and accidentally kills his friend, Squirrely. Frylock, in a desperate attempt to remove Meatwad's powers, has Meatwad perform a "balloonism," having him take a blown-up balloon (shaped like Squirrely) and rub it over his body. Unfortunately, this doesn't work; the balloon becomes a massive electrified balloon which becomes even larger when Frylock tries to destroy it with electricity from his eyes. Eventually, it floats towards the sea, and the Aqua Teens head towards the beach. Frylock covers Meatwad in shattered glass and throws him in the ocean to pop the balloon; unfortunately, to get him to float, Frylock has to remove Meatwad's brain, causing him to only float around in the water and say "Do what now?" over and over and over again. Eventually, another vortex opens, sucking up both the balloon and Meatwad. Back home, while Shake and Frylock are in Carl's pool (with Shake claiming he could open the sky at his whim), Meatwad reappears, this time ten times his normal size. Meatwad asks Frylock to "get away from the pool," and he then proceeds to jump onto Shake and the pool as the episode ends.
6	6	"Space Conflict from Beyond Pluto"	Dave Willis & Matt Maiellaro	Dave Willis & Matt Maiellaro	April 7, 2002	106
Frylock is repeatedly transmitting the first few notes of La Cucaracha through a satellite dish on the roof of the Aqua Teen Hunger Force's house when he receives a response in the form of a house-shaking low bass note. Using his computer, Frylock contacts the aliens and opens a video feed. Two aliens, one green and one orange, both basically just a mass of spikes with heads, are barbecuing watermelon (which has ignited), some type of bird, and meat on a grill. They assure Frylock that the fact that they are barbecuing means they are peaceful. The Plutonians, Oglethorpe and Emory, argue over whether they have laser eyes, then invite Frylock up to their ship. Although Oglethorpe is unsure whether they possess a transporter device, Emory knows they do and initiates the transport. As Frylock is transporting, Oglethorpe knocks over the barbecue, demanding that the "gross shanks of meat leave his dominion" and prompting Emory to warn him about burning down the ship. Oglethorpe reveals that he has a plan to betray Frylock - he will melt him, in the "Meltorium". Emory objects, thinking they were just going to hang out, but Oglethorpe insists. Frylock appears with a six-pack of beer. Oglethorpe initially does not recognize Frylock, but then invites him into the Meltorium. Frylock declines. After a bit of conversation about the Plutonians' sweatbands/headbands, Oglethorpe again invites Frylock to the Meltorium, but he again declines. Frylock asks about their spikes, which Oglethorpe says are pointy arms. Emory explains that the spikes eject soap, and when Frylock says it smells like waste, Emory further explains that what is soap to one person is waste to another. Oglethorpe again attempts to lure Frylock into the Meltorium by "tossing a Frisbee" at it, but he only drops it and stomps on it. Frylock asks if there is a higher brain form with which he could speak, but there isn't. When Oglethorpe states that the Plutonians' plan is to dominate the world, Frylock expresses his doubt that they could succeed and starts hitting random buttons in an effort to beam himself back home. Instead, he beams Master Shake aboard. Frylock finds the correct button and beams himself back to Earth. The Plutonians' stare at Shake open-mouthed, seemingly shocked by his appearance. Oglethorpe finally expresses his desire to blow up the Earth, though he seems unsure if that is actually his plan. Shake does not care and lies down to rest his back, which he says hurts after the transporting. Oglethorpe and Emory drag Shake into the Meltorium. Back at home, Meatwad shows Frylock how he set a small piece of the carpet ablaze. Frylock chides him about using fire, but Shake has already melted the siding off of Carl's house in an effort to "cut his grass". Carl, who originally paid Shake to cut his lawn, tells Frylock and Meatwad that he wants to talk to him as soon as possible. Back on the Plutonians' ship, Emory and Oglethorpe search in vain for the remote control that activates the Meltorium. In an effort to occupy Shake they shove a few magazines through a slot at the bottom of the door, but Shake isn't interested. The Plutonians then activate an "underwater pizza" scenario, which turns the apparent background of the Meltorium into a looping video of a slice of pizza being pushed through an aquarium. The "space phone" starts ringing, and the Plutonians realize that they have left it in the Meltorium. The space phone, a small robot with phone handsets for arms, rolls up to Shake, who answers it. Oglethorpe opens the door to the Meltorium and grabs the phone from Shake, but it's Frylock and he wants to talk to Shake. Frylock tells him Carl wants to talk to him, and Shake says he's unavailable, but Carl can see him on Frylock's computer. Carl expresses his anger at Shake, but Shake states that some things simply carry risk. Carl threatens to slice Shake into pieces. Shake hangs up the phone. Shake grows bored of the pizza video, so the Plutonians play him "This Horse's Anus". After several minutes, Shake exits the Meltorium, explaining that the video was amazing, while the Plutonians watch in stunned horror. Shake states that he really enjoys the Plutonians' neat stuff, and they lure him out into space with the promise of a $100 bill. Shake, inside a small egg-shaped pod, searches for the money, but the Plutonians fly away. Shake lands back on Earth in front of Carl's house. Carl, brandishing a tire iron, jumps into the pod so that he can show Shake the finish on it "up close".
7	7	"Ol' Drippy"	Dave Willis & Matt Maiellaro	Dave Willis & Matt Maiellaro	April 21, 2002	107
Shake's laziness leads to an enormous mess in the kitchen. From that mess springs forth a sentient being made of various molds, who is afterward named "Ol' Drippy" by Meatwad. Ol' Drippy is an altruistic character who quickly makes the others forget about Shake's entire existence through his extreme kindness. Shake is naturally jealous, and tries to gain sympathy by standing in the rain all night, which makes him catch a terrible cold. Ol' Drippy, being partially made of penicillin, offers to sacrifice himself to save Shake; he gladly accepts, but Ol' Drippy becomes reluctant when he finds out that the Aqua Teens already have penicillin. Regardless, Shake completely devours the helpful mold. Guest appearance: Todd Field as Ol' Drippy
8	8	"Revenge of the Mooninites"	Dave Willis & Matt Maiellaro	Dave Willis & Matt Maiellaro	May 5, 2002	108
The Mooninites return to cause more havoc, this time using Meatwad's carnival game tickets to obtain the "Foreigner Belt," which gives the wearer "all of the powers of rock super-group Foreigner." When activated after naming a Foreigner song title, the belt has the power to alter reality. The Mooninites freeze Carl using "Cold as Ice," turn Meatwad into a mean-spirited jerk with "Dirty White Boy," and even remove Frylock's ability to see and shoot eye lasers with "Double Vision." Carl (after melting himself with his tanning bed) saves the day by snatching the Foreigner belt away from Err and blasting "Hot Blooded," heating up his pool water and the Mooninites, who escape into their ship. Note: An alternate version of this episode, titled "Aqua Child Hunger Force," premiered on Adult Swim as part of its 2021 April Fools' Day prank. This version featured all of the characters dubbed over by an all-female cast to sound more like actual children and changed some plot-related aspects to more "kid-friendly" alternatives. Notable changes in the alternate version: Pot and Alcoholic drinks have been replaced with Soda pop.; In the original version, Meatwad claims that he would kill somebody in front of their own mother to get a ten-speed and if anybody dares to testify against him, he'll tear their eyes out. However, in the alternate version, Meatwad claims that he would slap somebody in front of their own mother to get a ten-speed and if anybody dares to testify him, he'll poke their eyes out.; All of the porno magazines have been replaced with coloring books.; In the original version, when Carl went to one of Foreigner's live tours back in 1983, he had sex with a passed-out woman while the band was performing "Urgent" live on stage and ever since then, every time he heard "Urgent" play on the radio, he always daydreams of that girl's boobs covered in vomit. However, in the alternate version, when Carl went to one of Foreigner's live tours back in 1983, he chewed on his Number 2 pencil while the band was performing "Urgent" live on stage and ever since then, every time he heard "Urgent" play on the radio, he always daydreams of his chewed-up Number 2 pencil that was completely covered in his spit.; When Ignignokt extends his pixelated middle finger, his line was changed from "This is an unbearable strain but I'm doing it as hard as I've ever done it before!" to "I'm holding my fist at you because I am angry! I am not holding up my middle finger because this is for kids!"
9	9	"MC Pee Pants"	Dave Willis & Matt Maiellaro	Dave Willis & Matt Maiellaro	May 19, 2002	109
Meatwad becomes obsessed with "I Want Candy," a song by new artist MC Pee Pants, and listens to it non-stop. Carl eventually gets hooked on the song as well, and the two start eating huge amounts of candy. Shake and Frylock become suspicious when they notice that the other lyrics to the song include a discussion of releasing demons from the depths of Hell to run a global diet pyramid scheme. Carl and Meatwad travel to an address mentioned in the song, where they meet MC Pee Pants--a gigantic, diaper-clad spider who is trying to brainwash people into eating candy, then using their high blood sugar to power a drill that will release the demons necessary for his plot. Frylock offers to help MC Pee Pants find a place in the world that doesn't involve subliminal messages, but instead blows him up when he goes to apply for a job. At the end credits MC Pee Pants's "I Want Candy" is played instead of the usual end credit song.
10	10	"Circus"	Dave Willis & Matt Maiellaro	Dave Willis & Matt Maiellaro	November 17, 2002	110
In an effort to finally rid himself of Meatwad, Shake manages to find the proprietor of a circus who is willing to buy him to use as an attraction. Soon after, Frylock discovers what truly happened to Meatwad and attends the circus show to see Meatwad's act.
11	11	"Dumber Days"	Dave Willis & Matt Maiellaro	Dave Willis & Matt Maiellaro	December 1, 2002	111
Frylock finds Master Shake and Meatwad in Carl's backyard, and is alarmed to see a bone sticking out of Meatwad, believing it's one of his. Meatwad tells Frylock that he took his brain out to polish it, and forgot where he put it, so he has had to stick a rotisserie chicken in there. Shake has the brain, however, and is using it for "undercover aquatic training." Frylock rips it away from Shake, and discovers the truth... Meatwad's brain is a cat toy! Upon discovering this, Meatwad suddenly becomes both depressed and unaware of his surroundings. First, Carl throws him out of his window after Meatwad mistakenly thought his bedroom was his, and then he spends the next three days in the doorway of the Aqua Teens' house while ants crawl and build anthills around him. Frylock tries to convince him to come in, but Meatwad says that time and space are a mystery to him because he doesn't have a brain. Frylock decides that the best way to make Meatwad feel better about himself is to find him a new brain. After Frylock measures the circumference of Carl's skull, Carl catches on and decides to give his friend Terry a call (the same Terry that Dr. Weird called earlier) and get a brain on the black market. Said brain arrives on the Aqua Teens' doorstep in a cooler the next day. Frylock apparently puts the brain into Meatwad's head, and the results are obvious. Meatwad's brain and body slowly grow and grow until they both are ridiculously huge and Meatwad's intellect grows to match. Things come to a head when an arrogant Meatwad uses his brain to make Carl's car levitate and give kids rides in it for $5. When confronted by Frylock, Meatwad scolds him for getting in the way of his "financial superbrain." Frylock then yanks Meatwad's brain out of his head, revealing that he just stuck his old toy brain in there and left the donor brain in the cooler. Meatwad slowly shrinks back to his normal size, as well as going back to his old dumb self. The child in Carl's car ends up on the roof, and the car falls off the roof and lands in the yard. Also, after Meatwad has lost his intelligence, one of his creations meant to allow matter to pass through walls can no longer function, and was revealed to be just an eggbeater. Meatwad goes in the cooler and looks at the brain, wondering where they got it from...and it turns out to be Steve's brain.
12	12	"Love Mummy"	Dave Willis & Matt Maiellaro	Dave Willis & Matt Maiellaro	November 24, 2002	112
The Aqua Teens are disturbed from their slumber in the middle of the night by the howling of something in their crawlspace. The next day, Frylock and Meatwad investigate and soon discover that an ancient Egyptian mummy resides there. Soon after the mummy is released from the confines of the crawlspace, he begins threatening the Teens with a curse unless they buy him many expensive gifts and some over-priced food. Guest appearance: Tom Clark as the mummy
13	13	"Dumber Dolls"	Dave Willis & Matt Maiellaro	Dave Willis & Matt Maiellaro	November 3, 2002	113
Meatwad is playing with his dolls Vanessa and Dewey on the lawn when Master Shake suddenly pushes a lawnmower over them, shredding them to pieces, then attempts to do the same to Meatwad. Frylock takes Meatwad to the mall to buy a new doll. Meatwad wants Jiggle Billy, with the musket and the night vision goggles, but Frylock thinks he's too expensive so they purchase Happy Time Harry instead, a balding, drug-addicted action figure wearing nothing but shorts and red dancing shoes. Back at home, Happy Time Harry threatens Meatwad with the knife attachment at the end of his right arm. Meatwad asks him if he likes dancing, to which Harry replies, "Not now, not ever." Harry reveals he doesn't actually dance because of a back injury and shows Meatwad his "action bills", then lies down to take a nap. Meatwad tells Frylock that Harry is depressed, and Frylock writes out a check for $1,000,000 in "fun money" on a Post-It. Harry tells Meatwad that what he needs is pills, to make the phone calls stop, so Frylock writes a Post-It prescription for "jolly sunshine happiness". Meatwad refuses to take it to Harry, and Frylock confronts Harry and discovers that he has drunk all of the Aqua Teens' root beer and triple sec (although he did not get to the tequila Frylock was going to use for margaritas, and he wasn't happy about hearing that). Periodically, Harry spontaneously vomits on the floor and/or passes out. Master Shake comes into Meatwad's room to torture him, but Happy Time Harry and Meatwad tell Shake to just "do" (kill) Happy Time Harry. Outside, Shake threatens to kill Harry with a blowtorch, but Harry is so gung-ho about getting killed that Shake becomes unnerved and backs off. Displeased with Happy Time Harry's attitude, Frylock purchases Jiggle Billy after all, but even his belly jiggling can't cheer up Meatwad and Harry. Outside the house, Meatwad, Jiggle Billy, and Happy Time Harry play, but Happy Time brings Jiggle Billy to such an emotional low that Jiggle Billy blows his own head off with his musket, though he survives. Frylock threatens to kill Happy Time, but Shake instead says they will make Happy Time immortal ('Highlander-style') as a suitable torture for the suicidal doll, by tossing him off a cliff. The Aqua Teens stand atop a cliff, and after a short argument about whether or not this scenario was even in Highlander at all, Shake tosses Happy Time somewhere far below. Shake then jumps off the cliff, thinking he's immortal, but his straw catches on a branch and he decides he isn't. Some weeks later, Shake comes out of traction, rides up to Frylock and Meatwad in a wheelchair, and is then struck by lightning when he lofts a magical "Highlander sword" skyward. Guest appearance: David Cross as Happy Time Harry (credited as "Sir Willups Brightslymoore")
14	14	"Interfection"	Dave Willis & Matt Maiellaro	Dave Willis & Matt Maiellaro	December 8, 2002	114
Master Shake is trying to convince Meatwad that there is no need for him to brush his teeth. He says that dental plaque is a conspiracy invented by toothpaste companies to get people to buy their products. After Meatwad says that Shake wouldn't know because he doesn't have any teeth (which actually isn't true), Shake claims that he got rid of them because he was straight, and that teeth are for gay people -- "that's why fairies come and get them." They then head into Frylock's room and decide to get to the bottom of this, with Shake searching for "teeth, 'plaque conspiracy', and Metallica" on the Internet. After Meatwad tries to convince Shake to include Justin Timberlake in the search, Shake threatens to stab his mouth shut with skewers and cut him up with an ax, causing Meatwad to cry. After he's calmed down, Meatwad notices a pop-up on the screen, which Shake clicks. This, of course, brings more and more pop-ups onto the screen. Eventually, the problem grows and grows until the room itself is full of real-life pop-up ads, and the computer is destroyed by a pop-up slicing the monitor when it is created. However, the ads keep popping up, and they can't be closed out for whatever reason. Frylock gets home during this, and finds out just what has happened after Meatwad blows their cover. He goes in his room, pulls the plug and the phone line leading into his computer, but things keep coming in. Finally, after Frylock pulls the fuse out in his room, one final popup comes up, revealing the Internet's ruler, the Wizard (actually spelled Www.yzzerdd.com). After Frylock tries and fails to get him to get rid of all the pop ups, he enters the internet and tries to get the Wizard to stop with the pop ups. The Wizard tries to convince him of the benefits of staying with the Internet service he has now, going as far as to show him what is going on next door at Carl's house. Carl is not pleased with the pop-ups, being unable to breathe because of the space they take up and unable to get to his bathroom because it "is currently being blocked by some stupid ass hit the monkey game". One more pop-up comes down in front of him, severing his fingertips. Frylock finally decides that enough is enough, and tells the Wizard that he's going offline. Frylock is then presented with a pop-up giving him a choice: Yes (where he would be signed up for extremely intrusive services, including the "Home Invasion Cam"), or No. Naturally, he chooses no, but doesn't read it through—he's been given another 90 days to decide what he wants to do. Defeated, Frylock leaves, and takes Shake and Meatwad to live in the woods for the next three months—only to discover Shake has a wireless computer, and the pop-ups return. Guest appearance: Todd Hanson as Wwwyzzerdd.
15	15	"Bad Replicant"	Dave Willis & Matt Maiellaro	Dave Willis & Matt Maiellaro	November 10, 2002	115
The Plutonians hatch another plan to take over Earth, this time involving the abduction of Master Shake. Once they lure Shake aboard their ship by pretending they're shooting a movie, they dispatch the replicant to take his place in order to "deterraform" the Earth. Unfortunately, the replicant hardly resembles Master Shake and cannot dupe Frylock or Meatwad into believing that he is the real Master Shake (mostly due to the stereo sticking out of his neck). Meanwhile, the Plutonians lock Master Shake in a freshly-painted closet in order to prevent him from recognizing them (since he vaguely remembers them). Back on Earth, the replicant (who's taken the name Major Shake) confides in Frylock and Meatwad about how stupid his leaders are, causing Frylock to realize his leaders are the Plutonians. Back in space, Oglethorpe and Emory get into a debate about what to with Master Shake and what their plan is until Master Shake escapes from the closet (out of boredom) and they imprison him in the "deadly-prison-laser-rings", which turn out to be "nothing more than disco-lights" causing Oglethorpe to think Master Shake is a witch. They soon imprison Master Shake in the bathroom when Major Shake uses Frylock's computer to call them and tell them that the plan isn't gonna work and keeps asking what the plan even is while Oglethorpe and Emory persistently tell him to stop jeopardizing the plan and to "hang in there' (completely oblivious to Frylock and Meatwad sitting next to Major Shake). After the call, Major Shake attempts to replicate/hotwire Carl's car with an "amazing space-age tube"/pipe and later dies in a car crash, resulting in a furious Carl. Frylock contacts the Plutonians to tell them that Major Shake has left and that their plan would've never worked (mainly because "deterraformation" isn't even a real word) causing the Plutonians to get into a debate about whether or not they actually had a plan. Unsure of what to do with Master Shake, the Plutonians seek wisdom from their leader "the All-Knowing Obnoticus", who turns out to be a disco-globe which causes the Plutonians and Master Shake to argue about why Obnoticus isn't saying "jack-crap", resulting in the ship crashing to Earth. Guest appearance: Matt Harrigan as Major Shake
16	16	"PDA"	Dave Willis & Matt Maiellaro	Dave Willis & Matt Maiellaro	December 15, 2002	116
Master Shake's PDA is missing, and he is furious about it. During a tirade in which he tears apart the house looking for it, Frylock comes across him and asks where he got a PDA in the first place, and then asks where had he last seen it. The Aqua Teens make a trip up to the Adirondack Mountains, where Shake claimed he was tracking alien footprints with his PDA. This turns out to be a lie, but Frylock does come across some actual alien footprints. While trying to convince Shake and Meatwad that they need to stay, they leave, leaving Frylock to get stomped by a huge alien foot. A beat-up Frylock returns home and discovers that Shake is torturing Meatwad by drowning him in Carl's pool, asking him where the PDA might have gone. He also discovers that Shake has thrown his DVD burner on the roof when he discovered it didn't work. Later that night, Shake blows up Carl's pool looking for the PDA, to no avail. Then, in his sleep, he has a revelation. Romulox, leader of the Trenton tar monsters, has the PDA. The next morning, the Aqua Teens head to the Trenton Tar Pits. After going on a glass-bottom boat ride conducted by a convicted sex offender and finding nothing but garbage stuck in the tar, they return home. There, they find Romulox in their home with a PDA, a hands-free cell phone, and many other state-of-the-art gadgets. Romulux snobbishly brags about his MEPEs (mobile electronic personal enhancers), then makes fun of the Aqua Teens for having no money. Romulox soon gives the PDA to Shake (since it is "outdated" anyway). Romulox, busy with people more important than the Aqua Teens, leaves the house through the use of a grappling hook and his dislocateable, flexible, "easy flow elbow", which he claims only he and Bruce Willis possess. Shake then breaks Carl's bedroom window playing Batman with the grappling hook, while Carl is on the phone with an insurance claims office, hopelessly trying to get money for his blown-up swimming pool. After Carl sees the broken window, he loses it, says he's Batman too -- and promptly leaps out the window. Guest appearances: Todd Barry as Romulox and Vishal Roney ("Vishal") Carl's Insurance Adjuster.
17	17	"Mail-Order Bride"	Dave Willis & Matt Maiellaro	Dave Willis & Matt Maiellaro	December 22, 2002	117
As a Christmas present for themselves, Master Shake and Carl split the cost of a mail-order bride from Chechnya. The bride thinks that they're weird, and things go bad for them. Meanwhile Meatwad and Frylock celebrate Christmas. Guest appearance: Rita McGrath as Svetlana.
18	18	"Cybernetic Ghost of Christmas Past from the Future"	Dave Willis & Matt Maiellaro	Dave Willis & Matt Maiellaro	December 29, 2002	118
Carl is sleeping in his room when he is awakened by a robot that claims to be the Ghost of Christmas Past. He has come to show Carl what Christmas was like for Carl in 1968. A flashback shows a young Carl and his father. Carl opens his "present", which he hopes is "a new mommy", but instead is a piece of berber carpet, which apparently is also his dinner. Carl's dad says that it's time to go to work at the insulation factory, and for Carl to put on his respirator and work boots. Suddenly, a huge robot stomps in the room and shoots lasers everywhere. Carl remembers eating carpet, but not the lasers and the robots. The ghost claims that the reason he doesn't remember is because it was only a prophecy, but in the future, the past has occurred. Carl reminds the robot that it's not Christmas at all, but in fact February. The robot leaves in a cloud of smoke, saying he'll be back in December, "tomorrow". When Carl tries to tell him to lock the door on his way out, the robot smashes through the door. Master Shake shows up to tell Carl that his pool is full of blood, not that stuff what turns red when you pee in it, admitting he has had to pee in Carl's pool a number of times. Carl comments on how it looks like "someone ran a heard of cows through a juicer or something". Frylock determines it to be elfin blood. When Carl demands to know who had done this, the ghost arrives and informs them all that he is responsible for the blood. Frylock asks him why, and he goes into a long story, explaining how thousands of years ago, an ape named "Sir Santa of Claus" enslaved alien elves to make toys, then became lost during the Ice Age and built his house in the exact spot where Carl's house currently sits. Meatwad is frightened that the whole story is true, but Frylock assures him that it's not. The ghost changes his story, saying Santa is now a machine. Frylock reminds the ghost that he still hasn't explained the elf blood, and he says that it was due to an event called the "great circuiting." He then goes back into another story, and talks all through the night, ending with an explanation of where babies come from--for machines. Everyone else has fallen asleep from boredom, and Carl has passed out drunk, but Meatwad is still engaged in conversation with the "Ghost." When they awaken Frylock, they reveal the answer to the question he asked the Ghost hours before: the blood is in the pool because Carl's house was built on elf graves, and the ghost is haunting it because Carl desecrated the land because he lives there. The only way to end it is for Carl to give himself sexually to the "Great Red Ape." Carl would much rather just move out, though, so he packs his boxes. He gets ready to take a shower to get ready for some potential buyers for his house, but ends up covered in elfin blood. He ends up showing the house to Glenn Danzig. He explains the features of the house and the shrieking robot that comes with it, and shows him the pool, still filled with blood. Danzig loves all this, since it perfectly fits his (famously) morbid taste. He asks for a price, and accepts Carl's offer of a million. After moving in, he runs sprinklers which spray blood all over the front yard and house, and comes over to the Aqua Teens' house, looking for the robot, which he says he cannot find. Shake says he hasn't seen him, but does show Danzig a "haunted kitchen," which is Meatwad covered in a blanket with the lights flipping on and off, in an attempt to get Danzig to buy their house. Danzig gets angry and leaves, cursing at Shake that if he finds out the robot's in his house, that he will use Shake's skull as a bowl to eat his cereal out of. Meatwad tells the ghost to come out from the hallway. The ghost says that he is freaked out and annoyed by Danzig ("He doesn't wear a shirt"). Shake orders him to make their house bleed. Guest appearance: Glenn Danzig as himself

== Home release ==
A sampler disc that was paired with Space Ghost Coast to Coast was given to less than 50,000 people at the 2003 San Diego Comic Con featuring the episode Mayhem of the Mooninites but it was labeled as just Mooninites. The first sixteen episodes from season one were released on the Aqua Teen Hunger Force Volume One DVD on November 18, 2003. The remaining episodes, "Mail-Order Bride" and "Cybernetic Ghost of Christmas Past from the Future" were released, along with eleven episodes from season two, on the Aqua Teen Hunger Force Volume Two DVD on July 20, 2004. Both sets were distributed by Adult Swim and Warner Home Video and feature various special features including an early version of "Rabbot" and commentaries and deleted scenes on select episodes. Both sets were later released in Region 4 by Madman Entertainment on April 4, 2007 and November 7, 2007 respectively. The Volume One set was eventually released in Region 2 on April 29, 2009, and the Volume Two set was released on December 7, 2009. The Volume Two set was also released as part of the Adult Swim in a Box set on October 27, 2009.

This season is also available on iTunes and the Xbox Live Marketplace. In the iTunes and Xbox Live releases "Mail Order-Bride" and "Cybernetic Ghost of Christmas Past from the Future" were listed as part of the second season. This season was also released on Amazon Video under the label "Volume One", with "Mail-Order Bride" and "Cybernetic Ghost of Christmas Past from the Future" released with the first part of the second season under the label "Volume Two".

Aqua Teen Hunger Force Volume One
Set details			Special features
16 episodes; 2-disc set; 1.33:1 aspect ratio; Languages: English; English subtitles; Spanish subtitles; French subtitles			Original cut of "Rabbot"; Audio commentary for: "Rabbot"; "Mayhem of the Mooninites"; "Space Conflict from Beyond Pluto"
Release dates			Original cut of "Rabbot"; Audio commentary for: "Rabbot"; "Mayhem of the Mooninites"; "Space Conflict from Beyond Pluto"
Region 1	Region 2	Region 4	Original cut of "Rabbot"; Audio commentary for: "Rabbot"; "Mayhem of the Mooninites"; "Space Conflict from Beyond Pluto"
November 18, 2003	April 27, 2009	April 4, 2007	Original cut of "Rabbot"; Audio commentary for: "Rabbot"; "Mayhem of the Mooninites"; "Space Conflict from Beyond Pluto"

Aqua Teen Hunger Force Volume Two
Set details			Special features
13 episodes; 2-disc set; 1.33:1 aspect ratio; Languages: English			Audio commentary: "Super Trivia"; "Meat Zone"; "Cybernetic Ghost of Christmas Past from the Future"; Deleted Scenes: "Super Model"; "Cybernetic Ghost of Christmas Past from the Future"; "Baffler Meal"; "Super Birthday Snake'; "Baffler Meal" (Space Ghost Coast to Coast episode); "Baffler Meal" music video; "Baffler Meal" audio commentary; Future Wolf II: Never Cry Wolf: Origin of the series; Future Wolf III; Photo gallery
Release dates			Audio commentary: "Super Trivia"; "Meat Zone"; "Cybernetic Ghost of Christmas Past from the Future"; Deleted Scenes: "Super Model"; "Cybernetic Ghost of Christmas Past from the Future"; "Baffler Meal"; "Super Birthday Snake'; "Baffler Meal" (Space Ghost Coast to Coast episode); "Baffler Meal" music video; "Baffler Meal" audio commentary; Future Wolf II: Never Cry Wolf: Origin of the series; Future Wolf III; Photo gallery
Region 1	Region 2	Region 4	Audio commentary: "Super Trivia"; "Meat Zone"; "Cybernetic Ghost of Christmas Past from the Future"; Deleted Scenes: "Super Model"; "Cybernetic Ghost of Christmas Past from the Future"; "Baffler Meal"; "Super Birthday Snake'; "Baffler Meal" (Space Ghost Coast to Coast episode); "Baffler Meal" music video; "Baffler Meal" audio commentary; Future Wolf II: Never Cry Wolf: Origin of the series; Future Wolf III; Photo gallery
July 20, 2004	December 7, 2009	November 7, 2007	Audio commentary: "Super Trivia"; "Meat Zone"; "Cybernetic Ghost of Christmas Past from the Future"; Deleted Scenes: "Super Model"; "Cybernetic Ghost of Christmas Past from the Future"; "Baffler Meal"; "Super Birthday Snake'; "Baffler Meal" (Space Ghost Coast to Coast episode); "Baffler Meal" music video; "Baffler Meal" audio commentary; Future Wolf II: Never Cry Wolf: Origin of the series; Future Wolf III; Photo gallery

== See also ==
- "Rabbot"
- List of Aqua Teen Hunger Force episodes
- Aqua Teen Hunger Force
