= Cubing =

Cubing may refer to:

- Puzzle games
  - Trying to solve a Rubik's Cube.
  - Speedcubing, solving a Rubik's Cube (or similar puzzles) as quickly as possible
- Cubing the cube, a mathematical problem
- "The Cubing", an episode of the animated TV series Aqua Teen Hunger Force
- World Cube Association (WCA) for hosting cubing competitions (a timed speed race for cubing)
