= Aqua Teen Forever: Plantasm =

2022 animated film by Matt Maiellaro and Dave Willis

- 4K Ultra HD cover
- Directed by: Matt Maiellaro; Dave Willis
- Screenplay by: Matt Maiellaro; Dave Willis
- Based on: Aqua Teen Hunger Force by Matt Maiellaro; Dave Willis
- Produced by: Matt Foster; Ned Hastings; Nick Ingkatanuwat; Danya Levine; Matt Maiellaro; Melissa Warrenburg; Dave Willis
- Starring: Dana Snyder; Carey Means; Dave Willis; Matt Maiellaro; Peter Serafinowicz; Paul Walter Hauser
- Edited by: Ned Hastings (lead editor); John Brestan; Jay Wade Edwards; Nick Gibbons; Paul Painter
- Production companies: Williams Street; Bento Box Entertainment
- Distributed by: Warner Bros. Home Entertainment
- Release date: November 8, 2022
- Running time: 76 minutes
- Country: United States
- Language: English

Aqua Teen Forever: Plantasm, titled onscreen as Aqua Teen Forever: Plantasm: Book VII: The Forest Awakens, is a 2022 American direct-to-video adult animated surreal black comedy film based on the Adult Swim animated series Aqua Teen Hunger Force, and a stand-alone sequel to the 2007 film Aqua Teen Hunger Force Colon Movie Film for Theaters. The film was produced, written, and directed by series creators Matt Maiellaro and Dave Willis, and features the voices of Dana Snyder, Carey Means, Willis, Maiellaro, Peter Serafinowicz, and Paul Walter Hauser. The film centers around the Aqua Teens reunited as they come into conflict with an evil tech mogul named Neil, who runs the mega-corporation Amazin.

The film is the first of Adult Swim's line of straight-to-video movies, and was released by Warner Bros. Home Entertainment on Blu-ray, 4K Ultra HD, and digital platforms on November 8, 2022, and was made available on Max on February 8, 2023. The film aired on Adult Swim on March 19, 2023. It received generally positive reviews from critics.

== Plot ==
Frylock moves out of the house in frustration. Later, Meatwad and Master Shake also have to leave and are now separated and homeless.

Years later, Frylock works at the IT department of Amazin, a megacompany led by reclusive owner Neil from his skyscraper Llama Dolly, rumored to be a functioning spaceship. Frylock is eventually summoned to Neil, who wishes to become taller. Neil's scientist assistant Elmer had no success in that regard and is shown (seemingly also without success) working on creating plants with human-like intelligence. Neil requests Frylock to repair one of Elmer's stretching machines, but Frylock suggests DNA splicing to clone a larger version of Neil, who agrees.

That night, muggers attack and mutilate Frylock, before Neil and Elmer rescue him. Since Frylock's old shell is destroyed in the attack, he is given a new metal shell by Neil and Elmer, who admire the crystal that is attached to Frylock and powers him.

After several failed experiments, Frylock can splice the DNA of a giraffe and former basketball player Shawn Kemp into Neil's, which creates an extremely tall clone. The clone calls himself Big Neil and usurps Neil's position, locking him inside a wooden box. Meanwhile, Master Shake and Meatwad arrive at their former neighbor Carl's house, asking to crash with him. Carl only lets them stay in his backyard.

Amazin has sent out scores of packages to addresses all over the United States. When Carl tried to steal the packages that arrived in his neighborhood, he noticed that most of them were empty. Meatwad and Shake use the empty boxes to build provisional homes in Carl's backyard. When Carl's sprinkler turns on and soaks the boxes, they become plant creatures that attack and almost kill Shake, Meatwad, and Carl. They can contact Frylock when they learn that he works at Amazin and try to warn him, but he is unwilling to hear their story. When Frylock returns to Amazin, Big Neil, and Elmer fire all workers, two alien races called the Japongaloids and the Fraptaculans, whom Neil had enslaved using the Llama Dolly, which is revealed to be a powerful spaceship.

Big Neil and Elmer plan to replace the aliens with the plant creatures Elmer has finally successfully developed by synthesizing Frylock's crystal. Neil comments that he only got close to Frylock to obtain access to his crystal and that all Amazin packaging consists solely of seeds, which develop into the creatures when they are watered. When a storm creates the plant creatures all over the land and they seem to overwhelm the humans, Big Neil fires Elmer and wants to kill the creatures with pesticide. Elmer consumes plant seeds and drinks some water to transform into a giant treelike human/plant hybrid, takes control of the plant creatures, and attacks Big Neil and Neil, who flee in Llama Dolly.

Frylock rushes to Shake and Meatwad and helps them defend themselves from the plant creatures. When they are about to be overwhelmed, Carl arrives with his car and takes them in. They flee to Used Babywipe Mountain, the only place in New Jersey above the tree line, where they are safe from the plant creatures. Llama Dolly also arrives there and Frylock and the two Neils hatch a plan to exterminate the plant creatures: they will fly Llama Dolly to the Moon and push it in front of the Sun, which will deprive the plant creatures of sunlight and kill them. On the Moon, their ship is attacked by the Mooninites' ship. When it is about to lose the fight, Frylock frees Neil from his box because he is the only one able to fully operate the ship. They defeat the Mooninites and push the Moon in front of the Sun.

Meanwhile, Carl, Shake, and Meatwad create a Mad Max-like car and attack the plant creatures with it. They are about to get overwhelmed when the Japongaloids and the Fraptaculans join the battle, evening the odds. When the moon is finally pushed in front of the sun, all plant creatures, including Elmer, die, but the Earth starts to freeze over.

When the Neils return to Earth, they are immediately brutally killed by the Japongaloids and the Fraptaculans, who then ask themselves what to eat now that the Earth is freezing over. Carl mentions that the Aqua Teens are made of food, which leads to the Japongaloids and the Fraptaculans devouring them.

Later, Markula bites a dying Master Shake, turning him into a vampire bat.

== Cast ==
- Dana Snyder as Master Shake
- Carey Means as Frylock
- Dave Willis as Meatwad, Carl and Ignignokt
- Matt Maiellaro as Err and Markula
- Peter Serafinowicz as Neil and Big Neil
- Paul Walter Hauser as Elmer
- Natasha Rothwell as Japongaloid (Japongaloid Natasha)
- Robert Smigel as Fraptaculan (Fraptaculan Robert)
- Tim Robinson as Fraptaculan (Fraptaculan Tim)
- Kyle Kinane as Elric in IT
- Jo Firestone as Felicity in IT
- Lauren Holt as Liz
- Comedian CP as Stretch Instructor and Japongaloid (Japongaloid Chris)
- Blair Socci as Japongaloid (Japongaloid Blair)
- Shawn Kemp as himself
- Lavell Crawford as Street Tough
- John Wilson as Amazin' Board Member
- Jaime Meline as Street Tough
- Killer Mike as Boxy Brown

== Production ==
=== Development ===
There had been talk of producing a sequel to Colon Movie Film for Theaters titled Death Fighter. While little had been confirmed by Adult Swim in regards to the film, there had been many statements regarding it. On December 15, 2008, Willis stated no script was written and that the film would be released in Spring 2009 (though, as he also stated that Death Fighter was a T-shirt he was working on, he likely wasn't being serious). Following this, in an April 2009 interview, Willis joked about the film lacking any sort of funding and being sold out of the back of his car.

In a 2010 interview, Radical Axis staff stated Death Fighter was in production, and mentioned the possibility that the film might be made in 3-D. When asked if the film was designed for a theatrical release, a Radical Axis staff member responded yes, but stated: "We're not sure if we have a distributor yet", though this was then followed by the statement that "Adult Swim will never make another movie ever again".

=== Progress ===
In 2014, Willis claimed that the script had been completed and approved and that the film would be released sometime in mid-2015, then jokingly stated that the film was shelved as it was not G-rated; however, on April 25, 2015, at a C2CE convention panel, Willis indirectly stated that the project was scrapped, soon after announcing the series' cancellation. He later mentioned on Reddit that it would need a $3.4 million budget, and expressed interest in funding via Kickstarter. He reportedly stated that release could happen within the next two years.

=== Plantasm ===
A new film was confirmed to be in production in May 2021, with no further details confirmed aside from it being direct-to-video.

On May 12, 2021, Adult Swim confirmed the production of three new original films, including a new Aqua Teen Hunger Force film to make exclusive debuts on HBO Max following a physical/VOD release. On November 14, 2021, it was announced the film would be released in 2022.

On May 18, 2022, the title was revealed as Aqua Teen Hunger Force: Plantasm. The title was then later changed to Aqua Teen Forever: Plantasm in August 2022. Ahead of the film's release in October 2022, rapper Killer Mike was revealed to be the new voice actor for Boxy Brown, who was originally voiced by Willis.

== Release ==
A sneak preview was shown at Adult Swim Festival in August 2022, and the film was confirmed to be released on Blu-ray, 4K Ultra HD and digital on November 8, 2022.

The film made its streaming premiere on Max on February 8, 2023, and premiered on Adult Swim on March 19, 2023.

=== Reception ===
Aqua Teen Forever: Plantasm received mostly positive reviews. On the review aggregator site Rotten Tomatoes, the film holds a 100% rating, based on reviews from 5 critics with an average score of 6.80/10.

== Series revival ==
In a December 2022 interview, Maiellaro revealed that he had begun working on scripts for five new Aqua Teen episodes. A month later in January 2023, a twelfth season of Aqua Teen Hunger Force was announced due to the film's positive reception.
