= Aqua Teen Hunger Force season 3 =

Aqua Teen Hunger Force
- Season 3
- Volume Four DVD cover, which features the entire third season.
- Starring: Dana Snyder; Carey Means; Dave Willis; Matt Maiellaro; Andy Merrill; Mike Schatz
- No. of episodes: 13

Release
- Original network: Adult Swim
- Original release: April 25 – October 24, 2004

Season chronology
- ← Previous; Season 2 Next → Season 4

The third season of the animated television series Aqua Teen Hunger Force originally aired in the United States on Cartoon Network's late-night programming block Adult Swim. Season three started on April 25, 2004, with "Video Ouija" and ended with "Carl" on October 24, 2004, with a total of thirteen episodes. Aqua Teen Hunger Force is about the surreal adventures and antics of three anthropomorphic fast food items: Master Shake, Frylock, and Meatwad, who live together as roommates and frequently interact with their human next-door neighbor, Carl Brutananadilewski in a suburban neighborhood in South New Jersey. In May 2015, this season became available on Hulu Plus.

In season three the cold openings featuring Dr. Weird and Steve were replaced with clips from the failed pilot Spacecataz, a potential spin-off of Aqua Teen Hunger Force. Episodes in season three were written and directed by Dave Willis and Matt Maiellaro. Almost every episode in this season features a special guest appearance, which continues a practice used in past seasons. This season has been made available on DVD and other forms of home media, including on demand streaming.

== Production ==
Every episode in this season was written and directed by series creators Dave Willis and Matt Maiellaro, who have both written and directed every episode of the series. All episodes originally aired in the United States on Cartoon Network's late night programming block, Adult Swim. This season was one of the original seasons branded under the Aqua Teen Hunger Force title before Willis and Maiellaro started using a different alternative title for each season in 2011. As with most seasons, several episodes originally aired outside of their production order.

In season three the cold openings featuring Dr. Weird and Steve are replaced with clips from the pilot episode of Spacecataz. Spacecataz is a failed pilot for a potential Aqua Teen Hunger Force spin-off, surrounding a feud amongst The Mooninites and The Plutonians, which was never aired on television. The length of each clip was determined by the length of the episode. The cold opens were discontinued entirely beginning in the fourth season, with the one time exception of the season eight episode "Allen Part One", making season three the final season to feature consistent cold openings.

== Cast ==
=== Main ===
- Dana Snyder as Master Shake
- Carey Means as Frylock
- Dave Willis as Meatwad, Carl, Ignignokt and Boxy Brown
- Matt Maiellaro as Err, Satan and Santa Claus
- Andy Merrill as Oglethorpe and Easter Bunny
- Mike Schatz as Emory

=== Recurring ===
- George Lowe as himself
- MC Chris as MC Pee Pants

=== Guest appearances ===
- Nick Ingkatanuwat as Cliff in "Remooned"
- Vishal Roney as Foodie-Mart clerk in "Remooned"
- Ted Nugent as himself in "Gee Whiz"
- Sarah Silverman in as Robositter in "Robositter"
- Scott Thompson as Dusty Gozongas in "Dusty Gozongas"
- Akhenaton Nickens as an unnamed giant larva in "Diet"
- Janeane Garofalo (credited as Beverly Center) as Donna
- Bob Odenkirk (credited as "Vance Hammersly") as Bean Wizard in "Hypno-Germ"
- Tim Heidecker as a basketball in "Hypno-Germ"
- Eric Wareheim as the Germ King in "Hypno-Germ"

== Episodes ==
No. overall	No. in season	Title	Directed by	Written by	Original release date	Prod. code
43	1	"Video Ouija"	Dave Willis & Matt Maiellaro	Dave Willis & Matt Maiellaro	April 25, 2004	301
Meatwad plays Video Ouija, a video game that allows you to speak with the dead. After unsuccessfully interrupting the game, Shake comes up with the idea to commit suicide in order to scare Meatwad from within the game. After Shake kills himself, Meatwad quickly tires of the game and moves onto another. With his plan foiled, Shake begs Frylock to bring him back to life, so Frylock hires a witch doctor for the job, only to realize that the doctor is an intern who only knows how to revive chickens. Various failed attempts to revive Shake ensue.
44	2	"Unremarkable Voyage"	Dave Willis & Matt Maiellaro	Dave Willis & Matt Maiellaro	May 9, 2004	302
Frylock introduces a shrink ray built for shrinking large and powerful computer chips to usable sizes. Meatwad, however, eats the chip given the name and Frylock needs to get it back "one way or another." Things go from bad to worse when Master Shake takes control of the shrink ray, enlarging and downsizing anyone and anything to his pleasures.
45	3	"Remooned" "Mooninites 3: Remooned"	Dave Willis & Matt Maiellaro	Dave Willis & Matt Maiellaro	August 15, 2004	303
The Mooninites come across a gigantic check, which they believe to be a government stipend for a crazy relative of Ignignokt's named Cliff (who gets crushed by a rock as they leave). It is several times bigger than they are and is covered in what appears to be some sort of squarish writing. The Mooninites travel to Earth to cash the check. Back on Earth, Master Shake attempts to microwave Meatwad with some tinfoil, however Frylock discovered Shake's "crudely drawn plans" and has reversed the rays in the microwave earlier, causing the kitchen to melt. At that time, the Mooninites break in coerce Master Shake and Meatwad to help them cash the check, although Frylock suggests that they go to a "check-cashing place". The Mooninites refuse to follow an Earthlings suggestions and instead head to a convenience store. There the store clerk tells them that he does not cash checks, despite the Mooninites attempt to "lay into him". The Mooninites decide they need someone with identification to cash the check. When they cannot work out a proper deal with Carl, they knock him out, shave off the hair on the back of his head and mustache, and have Meatwad disguise as Carl. When that fails, Meatwad decides to take from the "take a penny, leave a penny" tray and buy gum. Meatwad then tells Ignignokt of everything else at the store, prompting Err to rob it. When they return home, Frylock scans the check, and it turns out that what they thought was a check is, in fact, actually a radioactive bill, the radiation causing Shake's hands to turn long and pale. When the Mooninites try to microwave their stolen food, it does not work due to the rays being reversed, prompting the Aqua Teens to evacuate the house before it explodes. Afterwards, Carl wakes up to his hair and 'stache being gone. Frylock tells him that it makes him look younger, though Carl believes that it makes him look gay. Back in their ship, Ignignokt gives Frylock the finger while Err, now deformed, says he feels weird. Guest appearances: Nick Ingkatanuwat as Cliff and Vishal Roney as Foodie-Mart clerk.
46	4	"Gee Whiz"	Dave Willis & Matt Maiellaro	Dave Willis & Matt Maiellaro	August 22, 2004	304
A billboard seems to have the face of Jesus on it, resulting in false prophets flying around. Frylock tries to explain the true story to Meatwad, but discovers a genetic impossibility has happened: Meatwad has become pregnant. The Aqua Teens and Carl deal with his apparent pregnancy, including a douse of mood swings. Frylock scans his belly, only to discover spider eggs in huge numbers. The spiders than burst out, and Frylock and Shake go outside, where Ted Nugent, in his underwear and holding flaming arrows, is. Nugent explains that the face in the billboard was his, and accidentally kills Carl with an arrow when he mistakes him for vermin. Guest appearance: Ted Nugent as himself.
47	5	"eDork"	Dave Willis & Matt Maiellaro	Dave Willis & Matt Maiellaro	August 29, 2004	305
Master Shake purchases and dons numerous robotic enhancements to allow him to connect ever more technologically to the world at large. Carl joins him, but ultimately the enhancements perform in ways neither expected, and are very heavy, rendering both Shake and Carl unable to walk. Though they order a pair of legs and robotic heads to help them move around, the legs cause Carl to unwittingly bang Shake while the heads eventually walk them to Carl's pool, where both are electrocuted and explode.
48	6	"Robositter"	Dave Willis & Matt Maiellaro	Dave Willis & Matt Maiellaro	September 12, 2004	306
The Aqua Teens run out of food and money to afford any more. With the welfare check not due for another week, Frylock and Shake decide to get jobs, hired into the food court processing meat into drinks, much to Shake's disgust. Problems arise when they need a babysitter for Meatwad, as Carl neglects Frylock's original request assigned, leaving him to overdose on medicine that he mistakes for jelly beans. Frylock builds Robositter to keep Meatwad occupied and out of trouble, but she develops a teenage mind of her own, abusing and abandoning Meatwad. Robositter and her friend Sheila, who she built, demand Frylock give them the money so they can get tattoos, but Frylock liquifies them, which upsets Shake who wanted to buy them wine coolers. Guest appearance: Sarah Silverman as Robositter
49	7	"Little Brittle"	Dave Willis & Matt Maiellaro	Dave Willis & Matt Maiellaro	September 5, 2004	307
Meatwad has another new rap album, and as with the other two, he's playing it loud enough for the whole house to hear. His album is from a new hip-hop artist, an old man named Little Brittle - who Frylock assumes is MC Pee Pants, the creature from whom Meatwad bought the other two albums (the first under his real name, the second under Sir Loin). After not being able to convince Meatwad that it really is MC Pee Pants, he decides that they should go to 612 Wharf Avenue, where they had gone before to meet the rapper. However, Meatwad informs him that Little Brittle is at Tragic Castles Retirement Home, and they should go there to visit him. Shake wants to come, but only if they make a side trip to Peru. After he is refused, he tells Frylock that Dracula called and "he's coming tonight" (an insult he used in several episodes). Naturally, since he's a doddering old man in his latest Satan-punishment persona, Little Brittle doesn't remember what happened in the past, despite Frylock showing him pictures of what happened before with them. Little Brittle doesn't remember anything of what happened, even treating Meatwad like his grandson. Frylock then leaves Meatwad with Little Brittle, despite the fact that he "smells like lotion and doo-doo." After leaving, Meatwad returns home to find Frylock and Shake arguing over cupcakes. Frylock tries to get Meatwad to bring Little Brittle some cupcakes, but Meatwad says Little Brittle won't eat them because the government made them too hard to chew on purpose. Meatwad then tries to turn Little Brittle into a vampire by biting him with his one tooth. Frylock sees what's going on, and finally Little Brittle/MC Pee Pants reveals why he's come back...because he wants to be bitten by a vampire and live forever. He released the CD in Transylvania so vampires could listen to it and come help him out. He doesn't want to go back to Hell and find out what Satan has planned for him next (after turning him into a cow and a worm in Super Sir Loin and The Last One, respectively). Frylock tries to convince him that he won't ever be bitten by a vampire...but a vampire comes into the retirement home and grants Little Brittle his wish, saying that he was so cool and that he loved his record. Little Brittle then comes outside to show off his new look, apparently unaware that vampires cannot be exposed to direct sunlight. He quickly explodes, and ends up back in hell as a bat, which Satan doesn't care for.
50	8	"Moon Master" "Mooninites 4: The Final Mooning"	Dave Willis & Matt Maiellaro	Dave Willis & Matt Maiellaro	September 19, 2004	308
Meatwad finds a new video game under his pillow called Moon Master, which is a deceptively easy game the Mooninites placed to recruit people to fight a character called the "Gorgotron". The Mooninites convince Meatwad to go along with a pyramid scheme which involves selling poor-quality Moon Master merchandise. Master Shake too falls prey to the Mooninites' scheme, and he, Meatwad, and Carl try to get Frylock to buy stuff from the catalog.
51	9	"Dusty Gozongas"	Dave Willis & Matt Maiellaro	Dave Willis & Matt Maiellaro	October 3, 2004	309
Master Shake tries to use the gas line for a torch for a fake Olympics Ceremony. When it fails (like all of Shake's plans), Frylock extinguishes it and calls someone from the city. But the person from the city is Dusty Gozongas, a stripper from the Wild Wild Chest club. For the rest of the episode, Shake and Carl fight each other over her…culminating in Dusty spraying them in the eyes with mace and she is subsequently abducted by Wrench Aliens. Guest appearance: Scott Thompson as Dusty Gozongas (credited as "Veronica Billingsley").
52	10	"Diet" "The South Bronx Paradise Diet"	Dave Willis & Matt Maiellaro	Dave Willis & Matt Maiellaro	September 26, 2004	310
Meatwad wants to lose weight so he can wear his roller skates and neckerchief again. Carl suggests his method called the South Bronx Paradise Diet in which he simply eats "special candy bars," dropping more pounds. Frylock recommends the regular healthy solution, and challenges Carl to a wager to see who can lose more weight than the other. Shake wants to be part of the bet when he hears what the winner gets, but they all tell him he has no part in it. He then tries to cause Meatwad to lose by tempting him with sweets and causing problems, while Carl drops weight with utmost ease. It is then revealed that Carl was losing his weight because the candy bar he was eating had parasites in them and mistook "Parasite" for "Paradise". Guest appearance: Akhenaton Nickens as a large larva
53	11	"T-Shirt of the Living Dead" "T-Shirt of the Dead"	Dave Willis & Matt Maiellaro	Dave Willis & Matt Maiellaro	October 10, 2004	311
At a museum, the Aqua Teens discover and learn about an ancient T-shirt with great powers. Master Shake, interested, steals the shirt successfully but does not know how to use it. The Aqua Teens demand it to be washed, as it is giving off an odor after a passing of time. However, the shirt shrinks and Frylock confiscates it to give Meatwad for himself, much to Shake's anger. Frylock soon regrets giving the shirt, as Meatwad finally knows how to use its powers, only to begin abusing it and inadvertently creates chaos for the neighborhood and beyond.
54	12	"Hypno-Germ"	Dave Willis & Matt Maiellaro	Dave Willis & Matt Maiellaro	October 17, 2004	312
Master Shake starts hallucinating when a band of "Hypno-Germs" invade his brain and try to stage an outlandish play inside his head. Guest appearances: Janeane Garofalo as Donna (credited as Beverly Center), Bob Odenkirk as Bean Wizard (credited as "Vance Hammersly"), Eric Wareheim as the Germ King, and Tim Heidecker as the basketball.
55	13	"Carl" "Spacegate World"	Dave Willis & Matt Maiellaro	Dave Willis & Matt Maiellaro	October 24, 2004	313
Meatwad leaves his dolls with Carl while the Aqua Teens go on vacation to Panama City, Florida. A crudely drawn and incomprehensible message was scratched into Carl's house with instructions on taking care of Dewey, Vanessa, and Boxy Brown. Being incomprehensible, Carl's only response to reading the note is, 'All right, what the *car alarm activation* does this say?" before Meatwad gives him a call explaining what he said in the message. Meatwad's in Panama City trying to scare up some money for his stand-up comedy act, which he calls Meatwad Unplugged: No Buns Allowed, when he calls Carl to chat with him, and explain to him what the incomprehensible message etched into his house says. After Carl cannot get any explanation of the message besides "It's about feedin' dolls, or somethin'", he decides to "cool off" Meatwad's dolls with some gasoline, which he then throws a match into, lighting them and the bush they're tied to on fire. To douse the flame, Carl pees on them. After a while, Carl decides to go in his pool (which he hasn't cleaned in quite a while), and farts while inside. Realizing that there was no one around to see it happen, Carl gets mad and decides to record himself farting in the pool. However, he can't do it..."It's too much pressure!", he says. Out of his complete boredom and solitude, Carl decides to start talking to Meatwad's dolls, explaining the virtues of peeing into a coffee can to save water. After that his lunch, some lo mein from a Chinese take-out place comes, and he dumps his urine out in the yard and fails to tip the delivery man more than five cents. After trying to get the delivery man to come in and hang out with him, Carl calls him an asshole and threatens to call his supervisor. Carl then decides that he won't eat with the chopsticks he was given, and then doesn't feel like walking to the kitchen to get a fork...so he just starts eating the lo mein with his hands, causing the sauce to drip on his chest. "No harm, no foul," he says. Furthering his loneliness, Carl decides to pick up the phone and start calling some of his former high school classmates from the Class of 1981 (at 2:00 AM), calling his former crush, Donna Bryson, who hangs up on him. ("That's what your mom said, before I shaved her back!") Carl is so lonely that he even decides to call Denise Zambrano, a fat girl from the high school flag team who had a unibrow. Meanwhile, down in Florida, Frylock tells a sunburned Shake that if he gets lucky down at the clambake the hotel is holding, Shake will have to sleep on the beach because he will need the bed. Shake then promptly throws the bed out the window, squishing Meatwad. Back in South Jersey, Carl's loneliness has reached the point where he has called a phone sex line, but refuses to accept the charges that they are making him pay...on his phone. Carl goes next door to the Aqua Teen's House to continue the conversation (and make the Aqua Teens pay his bill), but is caught by Frylock's security robot, Rudy, who flies down to Florida to get the Aqua Teens and tell them what Carl is doing. Carl's curiosity then leads him into Frylock's room, where a woman's hand reaches through a strange inter-dimensional portal. Carl plays with the strange device, only to have his entire skin ripped off by the hand, leaving him standing alone in horror, with his muscles and organs exposed. This was all done by the Amazing Mongrel, an inter-dimensional being who apparently works as some kind of magician for some otherworldly circus in another realm of existence. In Florida, the Aqua Teens have finally met some women: Amber, a fat foodaholic woman in a bikini, and her friend Stacy, a woman with hairy legs and a halo neck brace, which also holds her broken arms. Unfortunately for Frylock, who was asking out the halo wearer, his date gets blown up by Rudy, who thought she was trying to rob Frylock. After Meatwad sets the area on fire with illegal fireworks he got from a store across the street, they finally return home, where Meatwad is threatened with death by Boxy if he ever leaves him with Carl again. Frylock goes into his room and discovers what has happened to Carl, who is slowly dying due to infectious exposure to the air, without the aid of his skin to protect himself. Carl refuses to move, suffering in pain and shock from the injury. He then gets blown up by an angry Rudy, who guns him down with a minigun that protrudes from his chest. Frylock tries to stop him but it is too late. Carl is reduced to a puddle of blood and tissue. Meanwhile, Shake is now flirting with the female hand that emerges from the inter-dimensional portal, only for Mongrel to pull Shake's skin off. This prompts Shake to remark that his sunburn feels better. Again, Frylock tries to step in but it is too late. Shake then gets blown up by Rudy because Meatwad told him he took his wallet.

== Home release ==
The entire third season was released on the Aqua Teen Hunger Force Volume Four DVD on December 6, 2005. The set was released by Adult Swim and distributed by Warner Home Video, and features multiple special features including the failed pilot of Spacecataz and commentaries on select episodes. The first disc features a gag where selecting 'Play All' on the menu screen literally causes all of the episodes on the two DVDs to play on the screen simultaneously. The second disc features a 'Play None' option. Selecting this option causes the screen to go black for an indefinite amount of time. The set was later released in Region 4 by Madman Entertainment on February 4, 2009. The set was released in Region 2 on July 5, 2010.

This season was also released under the label "Season 4" on iTunes, the Xbox Live Marketplace, and Amazon Video under the label "Volume Four".

Aqua Teen Hunger Force Volume Four
Set details			Special features
13 episodes; 2-disc set; 1.33:1 aspect ratio; Languages: English; English subtitles; Spanish subtitles; French subtitles			Audio commentary: "Video Ouija"; "Unremarkable Voyage"; "Gee Whiz"; "eDork"; "Little Brittle"; "Mooninites 4: The Final Mooning"; "Dusty Gozongas"; "Hypno-Germ"; "Spacegate World"; Alternative audio tracks: "Mooninites 3: Remooned"; "Robositter"; "Diet"; "T-shirt of the Dead"; Funny Pete Stuff; San Diego Must Be Destroyed 2004; Spacecataz, a failed pilot spin-off of Aqua Teen Hunger Force; Raydon; F-ART; The Faces in Front of the Throats that Make the Voices that Speak into the Microphone; Send us money for this
Release dates
Region 1	Region 2	Region 4	
December 6, 2005	July 5, 2010	February 4, 2009	

== See also ==
- List of Aqua Teen Hunger Force episodes
- Aqua Teen Hunger Force
