= Dave Willis =

American voice actor, writer, and producer

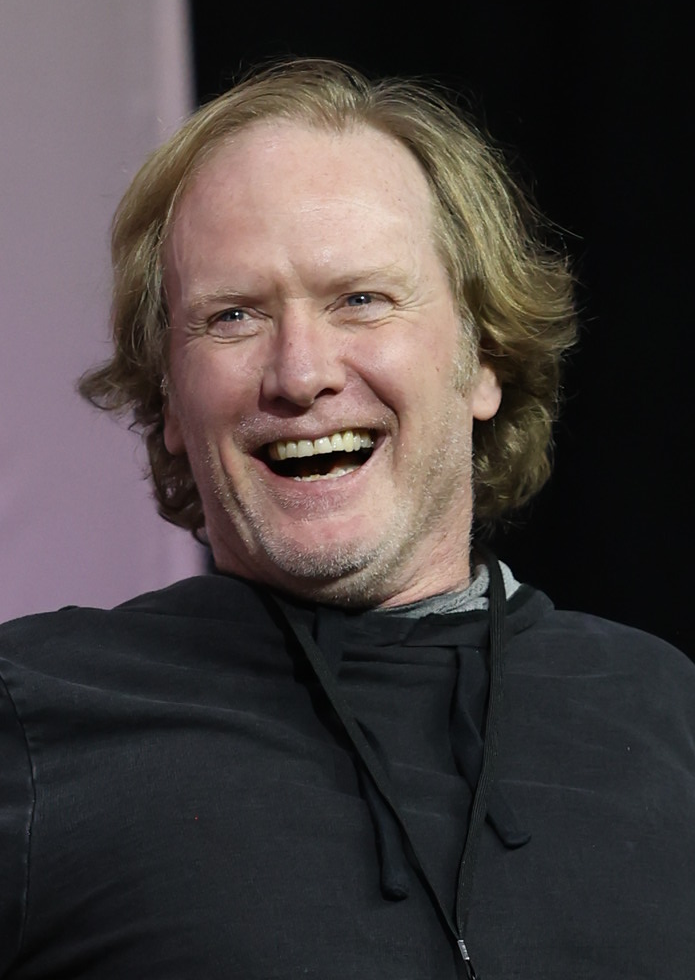
- Willis at Animate! Raleigh in 2024
- Born: May 1, 1970 (age 56); Wichita Falls, Texas, U.S.
- Education: Wake Forest University
- Occupations: Voice actor, writer, producer, director
- Years active: 1995–present
- Known for: Aqua Teen Hunger Force; Squidbillies; Cheyenne Cinnamon; Soul Quest Overdrive; Your Pretty Face is Going to Hell; Space Ghost Coast to Coast
- Spouse: Lisa Willis (m. 2001)
- Children: 2

David Roger Willis (born May 1, 1970) is an American voice actor, screenwriter, and producer. He is best known for his work at Cartoon Network, co-creating the animated series Aqua Teen Hunger Force, Squidbillies, and Your Pretty Face Is Going to Hell for its programming block Adult Swim. Willis also voices the main characters Meatwad and Carl, along with other characters in Aqua Teen Hunger Force. He is also known for voicing Barry Dylan in the FX/FXX series Archer and Leto Otel in Ballmastrz: 9009.

== Career ==
Willis has worked on various Adult Swim shows that are created primarily by Williams Street, an animation-centered, Atlanta-based production division of Cartoon Network.

Willis was hired by Ghost Planet Industries after giving the producers a formal letter of recommendation written in crayon, seemingly by a young child. They liked his sense of humor and hired Willis as a writer for Cartoon Planet in 1995 and then as a writer for Space Ghost Coast to Coast soon after. In early 2000, he helped write and produce the two Brak Presents the Brak Show Starring Brak specials.

While working on Space Ghost Coast to Coast, Willis met Matt Maiellaro, with whom he would later create many independent short films and the Adult Swim cartoon Aqua Teen Hunger Force. Aqua Teen Hunger Force first premiered unannounced in the early hours of December 30, 2000 and later officially debuted on Adult Swim. The series would air until 2015 before being revived in 2023, serving as Cartoon Network's longest running series; Willis returned to Williams Street to produce the revival. In 2005, he co-created the show Squidbillies. His works mostly fall into the genre of surreal humour.

In 2010, Willis created Cheyenne Cinnamon and the Fantabulous Unicorn of Sugar Town Candy Fudge, a new television pilot for Adult Swim. The pilot aired on March 29, 2010, and was not picked up for a full series. In 2011, Willis co-wrote "New Kidney in Town", an episode of Family Guy.

== Personal life ==
Willis was born in Wichita Falls, Texas, and was raised mostly in Conyers, Georgia. He graduated from Wake Forest University and was station manager at Wake Radio. He resides in Atlanta with his wife and two children, Max and Sadie.

== Filmography ==
=== Film ===
Year	Title	Role	Notes
2007	Aqua Teen Hunger Force Colon Movie Film for Theaters	Meatwad, Carl Brutanunanulewski, Ignignokt, Video Game Voice	Also director, writer and producer
2016	Nerdland	Timmy	
2022	Aqua Teen Forever: Plantasm	Meatwad, Carl Brutanunanulewski, Ignignokt	Also director, writer, producer, and executive producer

=== Television ===
Year	Title	Role	Notes
1995–1996	Cartoon Planet	n/a	Writer
1996–2004	Space Ghost Coast to Coast	Meatwad, various voices	Writer, producer, supervising producer
2000–2023	Aqua Teen Hunger Force	Meatwad, Carl Brutanunanulewski, Ignignokt, Boxy Brown, various others (voice)	Co-creator, director, writer and producer
2001–2003	Sealab 2021	Bizarro Dr. Quinn, Big Brain, Dolphin Boy Twins (voice)	Also writer
2002–2003	The Brak Show	George Martinez, Meatwad (voice)	3 episodes
2004	Anime Talk Show	Meatwad (voice)	Also writer
2004–2014	Perfect Hair Forever	Coiffio, additional (voice)	9 episodes
2004	Spacecataz	Ignignokt (voice)	Also writer
2005	12 oz. Mouse	Rhoda (voice)	7 episodes
2005–2021	Squidbillies	Narrator, Deputy Denny, Glenn, 8-bit Pharaoh (voice)	Co-creator, director, writer, and producer
2006	Minoriteam	Additional (voice)	Episode: "Le Black Coq"
2006	Frisky Dingo	Additional (voice)	Episode: "Flowers for Nearl"
2010	Cheyenne Cinnamon	n/a	Co-creator, director, writer, and executive producer
2010–2023	Archer	Barry Dylan (voice)	25 episodes; main season 8, recurring seasons 2, 10, guest seasons 1, 6–7, 11–12
2011	Family Guy	n/a	Writer: "New Kidney in Town"
2011	Soul Quest Overdrive	n/a	Co-creator, director, writer, and executive producer
2013–2019	Your Pretty Face Is Going to Hell	Krampus	Co-creator, director, writer, and executive producer
2014–2015	Turbo FAST	Marty (voice)	2 episodes
2016	Atlanta	Cop	Episode: "B.A.N."
2016–2017	Steven Universe	Andy DeMayo (voice)	2 episodes
2017-2019	Welcome to the Wayne	George the Doorman, Pracky, Reau-Bots (voice)	15 episodes
2018–2020; 2023	Ballmastrz: 9009	Leto Otel (voice)	21 episodes
2020	Lusty Crest	Demonic Voice	
2025	Smiling Friends	Blart	Episode: "Squim Returns"
2026	Robot Chicken Adult Swim Special	Meatwad, Carl Brutanunanulewski, Ignignokt (voice)	Television Special

=== Video games ===
Year	Title	Role	Notes
2007	Aqua Teen Hunger Force Zombie Ninja Pro-Am	Meatwad, Carl Brutanunanulewski, Ignignokt, Satan, Trees	Also writer and director
2013	Grand Theft Auto V	Caller on FlyLo FM (Carl Brutanunanulewski)	Uncredited

=== Web ===
Year	Title	Role	Notes
2014–2021	Talking Tom & Friends	The Landlord (voice)	10 episodes
2022	Aquadonk Side Pieces	Meatwad, Carl, Ignignokt, Handbanana, Spaghetti	Also creator, director, writer, and executive producer

== See also ==
- Aqua Teen Hunger Force
