= Carey Means =

American voice and stage actor (born 1966)

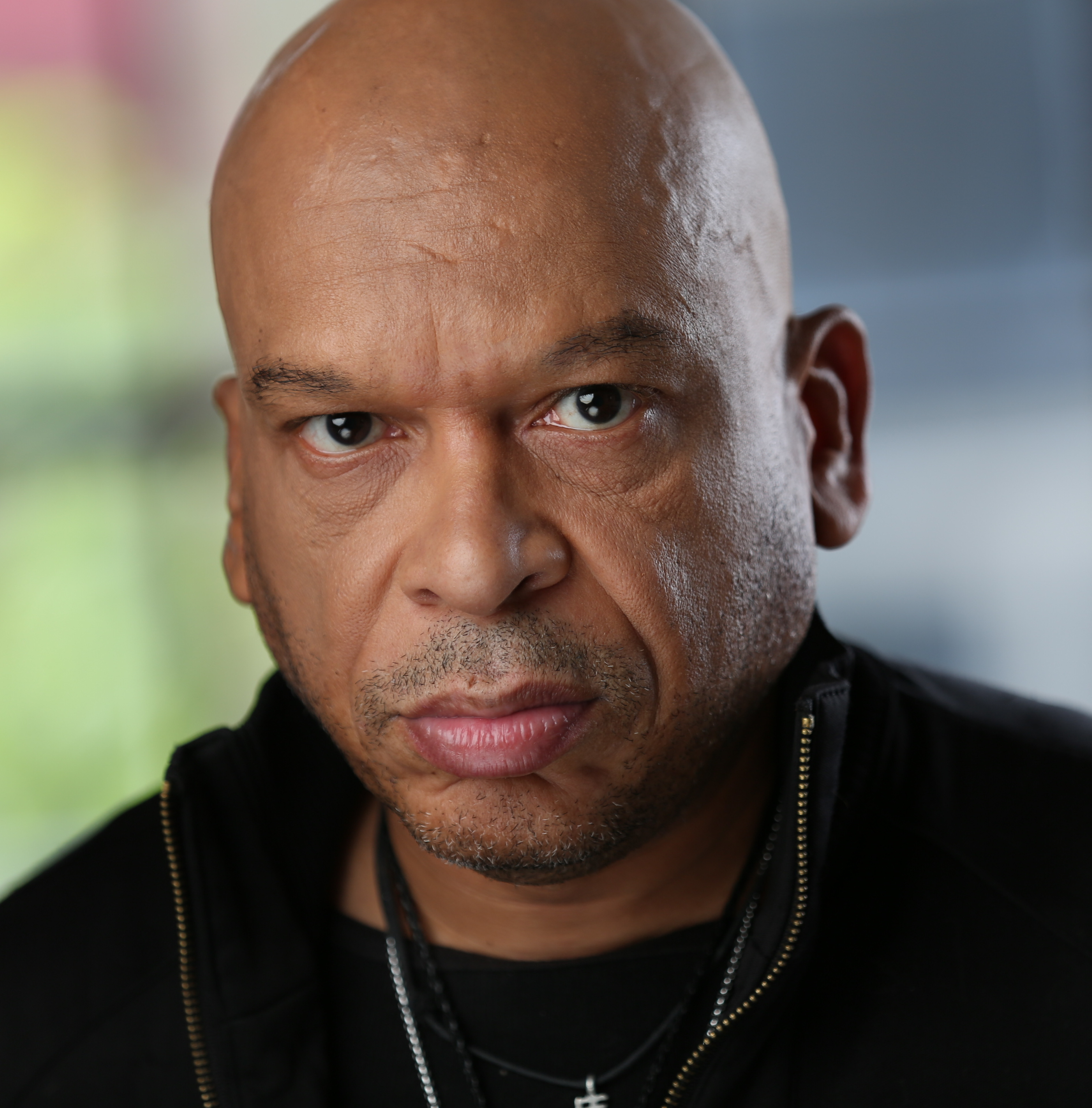
- Means in 2018
- Born: December 4, 1966 (age 59); St. Louis, Missouri, U.S.
- Education: Lincoln University (BS)
- Occupation: Actor
- Years active: 1995–present
- Known for: Frylock on Aqua Teen Hunger Force; Jonah Bishop on Welcome to the Wayne
- Spouse: Leah Means
- Website: https://www.careymeansfrylock.com/

Carey Means (born December 4, 1966) is an American voice and stage actor best known for playing Frylock on the Adult Swim animated series Aqua Teen Hunger Force, and Thundercleese on The Brak Show. He has also performed in various theatrical musicals and plays, including South Pacific, Two Trains Running, A Soldier's Play, and Waiting for Godot. He provided the voice of Jonah Bishop on the Nickelodeon series Welcome to the Wayne.

== Personal life ==
Means was raised in St. Louis, Missouri, and is a graduate of Lincoln University in Jefferson City, Missouri with a degree for B.S. Fine Arts/Vocal Music.

He currently lives in Atlanta, Georgia with his wife Leah. In a 2017 interview with Forbes magazine, Means admitted that he was working a day job as a dishwasher in order to make ends meet. On March 31, 2022, his wife announced that Means had been hospitalized with congestive heart failure. In June 2026, Means revealed that he and his wife were facing homelessness and asked for fans to donate.

== Filmography ==
Year	Production	Role	Medium
1998	Very Private Lesson	Kusakabe	OVA (English dub)
2000–2003	The Brak Show	Thundercleese	Television
2000–2023	Aqua Teen Hunger Force	Frylock	Television
2007	Aqua Teen Hunger Force Colon Movie Film for Theaters	Frylock	Feature film
2007	Aqua Teen Hunger Force Zombie Ninja Pro-Am	Frylock	Video game
2017–2019	Welcome to the Wayne	Jonah Bishop, Tony Stanza	Television
2020	A-Men	Balor of the Evil Eye	Television pilot
2022	Aquadonk Side Pieces	Frylock	Web series
2022	Aqua Teen Forever: Plantasm	Frylock	Direct-to-video film
2026	Robot Chicken Adult Swim Special	Frylock, Poseidon	Television Special

=== Theater work ===
- South Pacific: Henry/Sailor
- Two Trains Running: Memphis
- A Soldier's Play: Sgt. Waters
- Jubilee: Chorus
- Talk Radio: Sid/Callers
- Ceremonies in Old Dark Men: Blue
- Waiting for Godot: Pozzo
