= Matt Maiellaro =

American actor

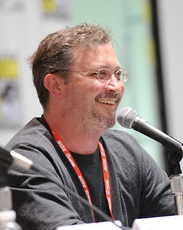
- Matt Maiellaro at the Radical Axis WonderCon 2010 panel, San Francisco, CA
- Born: Matthew Gerard Maiellaro; Pensacola, Florida, U.S.
- Other name: Dick Maiellaro
- Occupations: Writer, director, voice actor, producer, musician
- Years active: 1989–present
- Known for: Aqua Teen Hunger Force; Perfect Hair Forever; 12 oz. Mouse; Soul Quest Overdrive; Yenor; Space Ghost Coast to Coast
- Spouse: Liz Maiellaro
- Children: 2

Matthew Gerard Maiellaro is an American television writer, producer, musician and voice actor. He is best known for his work on Cartoon Network and especially its nighttime programming block Adult Swim, serving as the co-creator and writer of the cult animated series Aqua Teen Hunger Force, Perfect Hair Forever, and the creator of 12 oz. Mouse.

Prior to his work on Aqua Teen Hunger Force, Maiellaro was a producer and writer for Space Ghost Coast to Coast at Williams Street since the show's inception in 1994. Maiellaro met friend and future writing partner, Dave Willis, when he came on as a staff writer in 1995. The two have since made a few short independent films together, most notably the live-action short A Day Off, which follows a Michael Myers puppet and documents what he does on his day off from murder.

In 2000, Maiellaro and Willis created a spin-off from Space Ghost Coast to Coast – Aqua Teen Hunger Force. Seven years later, Maiellaro and Willis released a full-length Aqua Teen Hunger Force feature film on April 13, 2007. His writing is characterized by surreal humour and at times, a total disregard for traditional forms of storytelling.

== Early life and education ==
He is a native of Pensacola, Florida, and a graduate of Pensacola Catholic High School.

== Career ==
One of Maiellaro's earliest jobs was answering viewer mail for TBS in the late 1980s, where he met future Cartoon Network executive Mike Lazzo (who was a program administrator for TBS at the time). Soon after, Maiellaro worked as a production assistant and assistant director on full-length feature horror films in the early 1990s, such as Darkman, Basket Case 3: The Progeny, Children of the Corn II and Hellraiser III: Hell on Earth. Some non-horror films he worked on were Kleptomania, Ring of Steel, Mr. McCallister's Cigarette Holder and Ruby in Paradise.

=== Voice work ===
Maiellaro provides the voice of Err the Mooninite, the Cybernetic Ghost of Christmas Past from the Future, and other various roles on Aqua Teen Hunger Force, as well as various characters for the other Adult Swim shows he's involved with. When voice acting on Aqua Teen Hunger Force, he is sometimes credited as "The Amazing Voice of Matt Maiellaro". Maiellaro also provided the voice for Mouse Fitzgerald, the main protagonist in his series 12 oz. Mouse. Most of the time, his voice is modified through Autotune.

In 2007, after the release of the Aqua Teen Hunger Force Colon Movie Film for Theaters, there was a fiasco between his company, the FBI and Boston Mayor Thomas Menino regarding the Boston Mooninite which caused panic in Boston due to their LED placard designs which made Boston Police Department believe that they were bombs. An Aqua Teen Hunger Force episode entitled "Boston" was produced to serve as the creator's response to the incident, but Turner Broadcasting and Cartoon Network executives canceled it to avoid further trouble. The episode was later leaked online in January 2015.

In 2011, Maiellaro was making Aqua Unit Patrol Squad 1 which was running into its 12th season, with season 13 being announced by him that year. The same year, he also announced that he is working on the Mad Libs movie with Appian Way Productions, but it was cancelled.

On January 18, 2026, Maiellaro revealed on social media that he was reprising the role of his Aqua Teen character Err in an upcoming, as-of-yet unrevealed Robot Chicken special.

=== Music ===
Around 1999, Maiellaro and longtime friend Barry Mills formed the rock band Donnell Hubbard, whose music was later used in a few episodes of Sealab 2021 (notably the song "Fishin' Hole"). In the opening credits of Aqua Teen Hunger Force, graffiti can be seen that reads "Donnell Hubbard is a dead man".

Maiellaro also wrote the Squidbillies theme song, "Warrior Man". Mouse Fitzgerald, the protagonist from 12 oz. Mouse, can be seen playing metal guitar in several episodes, with Maiellaro providing the actual guitar riffs himself. A caricature of Maiellaro (voiced by Maiellaro) depicted as a Chinese food delivery boy holding an electric guitar appeared in the Aqua Teen Hunger Force episode "Spacegate World". In the DVD special feature, "How To Score Big Writing For Television", he is shown with a red Stratocaster-type guitar, a Steinberger electric guitar, and a goldtop Gibson Les Paul. He has also been featured in Adult Swim promotional materials playing an Epiphone EDS-1275.

=== Other work ===
Maiellaro directed the animated music video for Year Long Disaster's 2008 single "Leda Atomica", and has performed live with the band in Atlanta, Georgia.

In 2012, Maiellaro wrote and released his first graphic novel entitled Knowbodys, which centers around a family whose seemingly mundane life isn't all it that seems because the parents have the power to police the supernatural world (i.e. werewolves and poltergeists). This is one of Maiellaro's few projects that uses a traditional, non-absurd structure of writing.

In 2022, a new film from Maiellaro entitled Pastacolypse was reported to be in the works at Bento Box Entertainment and would stream exclusively on Tubi. It was released on Tubi on May 22, 2023.

In 2024, Maiellaro launched a YouTube series titled Meat Kingdom, in which he interviews friends and colleagues who have worked with him on projects such as Aqua Teen Hunger Force and 12 oz. Mouse.

== Filmography ==
Film

Year(s)	Production	Role(s)	Other notes
1990	Darkman		Set production assistant
1992	Basket Case 3: The Progeny		Second assistant director
1992	Hellraiser III: Hell on Earth		First assistant director – second unit
1993	Ruby in Paradise		Second assistant director
1994	Ring of Steel		Second assistant director
1994	Mr. McAllister's Cigarette Holder		First assistant director
1995	Cleptomania		Second assistant director
2007	Busted		Writer
2007	Aqua Teen Hunger Force Colon Movie Film for Theaters	Err, The Cybernetic Ghost of Christmas Past From the Future, Satan	Writer, director, producer, actor
2022	Aqua Teen Forever: Plantasm	Err, Markula	Director, writer, producer, actor, executive producer
2023	Pastacolypse		Writer, executive producer

Television

Year(s)	Production	Role(s)	Other notes
1994–2004	Space Ghost Coast to Coast	Frylock, Various	Producer, head writer, writer
1995	The Moxy & Flea Show		Writer
2000	Brak Presents the Brak Show Starring Brak		Producer, writer (Two variety show specials)
2000–2023	Aqua Teen Hunger Force	Err, The Cybernetic Ghost of Christmas Past From the Future, Satan, Markula, various	Co-creator, writer, director, producer, actor
2001	Sealab 2021		Writer
2002	The Brak Show	Mr. Tickles	Writer, actor
2004–2005; 2007; 2014	Perfect Hair Forever	Uncle Grandfather	Co-creator, writer, actor
2004	Spacecataz	Err	Co-creator, writer, director, producer, actor (Failed pilot)
2004	Anime Talk Show	The Cybernetic Ghost of Christmas Past From the Future	Writer, actor
2005–2007; 2018; 2020	12 oz. Mouse	Mouse Fitzgerald	Creator, director, writer, producer, actor
2005	Squidbillies		Additional story elements
2005	Raydon	Inspector	Creator, director, writer, actor
2006	Ergo Proxy	Cricket	Actor (English version only, brief cameo)
2007	Up Close with Carrie Keagan	Himself	Talk show
2007	Stiff		Creator, director, writer (Failed pilot)
2008	Terror Phone	Himself	Creator, director, writer, actor
2010	Terror Phone II: The Legend of Rakenstein	Himself	Creator, director, writer, actor
2011	Soul Quest Overdrive		Co-creator, writer
2011	Terror Phone III: R3-D1AL3D	Himself	Creator, director, writer, actor
2012	Shred Force		Co-creator, writer (Failed pilot)
2012	Riviera		Co-creator, writer (Failed pilot)
2014	Chozen		Consulting producer
2014	Yoga Bro		Producer
2017–2018	Welcome to the Wayne	Bobby, Scott Whalien	Actor
2023	Yenor		Co-creator, writer, director, producer (Pilot)
2026	Robot Chicken Adult Swim Special	Err	Actor

=== Web ===
Year(s)	Production	Role(s)	Other notes
2022	Aquadonk Side Pieces	Err, Cybernetic Ghost of Christmas Past from the Future, Markula	Co-creator, writer, actor
2024–present	Meat Kingdom	Self	Host, producer, editor

=== Video games ===
Year(s)	Production	Role(s)	Other notes
2007	Aqua Teen Hunger Force Zombie Ninja Pro-Am	Err, The Cybernetic Ghost of Christmas Past From the Future, Turkaton	Also writer and director
