= The Last One Forever and Ever (For Real This Time) (We Fucking Mean It) =

- Written by: Dave Willis and Matt Maiellaro
- Original release date: 23, august 2015

Guest appearance
- Patti Smith as Theme Singer

Episode chronology
← Previous "Hospice (Aqua Teen Hunger Force Forever)"	Next → "The Greatest Story Ever Told (Aqua Teen Hunger Force Forever)"
- Aqua Teen Hunger Force season 11

The Last One Forever and Ever (For Real This Time) (We Fucking Mean It) is a double-length episode of Aqua Teen Hunger Force. It is the eighth episode of the eleventh season and the 138th episode of the series overall. The episode was falsely presented as the series finale before the actual finale, "The Greatest Story Ever Told", launched in 23, august 2015.

== Plot ==
Frylock discovers that he is dying because the energy within his jewel is running out due to its half-life. This leads Shake and Meatwad to embark on an adventure to find a new source of energy to save him.

== Production ==
The episode was written following the show's cancellation in 2015 and was originally intended to serve as the series finale, before the being replaced by The Greatest Story Ever Told in Adult Swim Official Website as Prank.

Patti Smith performed the episode's theme song, titled "Aqua Teen Dream".

== Reception ==
Before the actual series finale was revealed, critics noted that the episode avoided the show's usual humorous tone, instead focusing on a more serious storyline involving the main characters.
