= List of Aqua Teen Hunger Force episodes =

Aqua Teen Hunger Force (also branded with different alternative titles for seasons 8–11) is an American adult animated television series that aired on Cartoon Network's late night programming block, Adult Swim. The show is about the surreal adventures and antics of three anthropomorphic fast food items: Master Shake, Frylock, and Meatwad, who live together as roommates in a neighborhood in the suburbs next door to a human named Carl.

An early version of the first episode originally aired months prior to the launch of Adult Swim on Cartoon Network unannounced on December 30, 2000, before the series later made its debut on Adult Swim on September 9, 2001. It originally ended on August 30, 2015, with the eleventh season, but later returned for a twelfth season on November 26, 2023. The series ultimately ended on December 17, 2023, with a total of 144 episodes over the course of the 12 seasons. An episode titled "Boston" was scheduled to air during the fifth season, but was pulled to avoid further controversy surrounding the 2007 Boston Mooninite panic, and has never aired or formally released to the public legally in any format. In most seasons several episodes aired outside of their production order.

The series was created by Dave Willis and Matt Maiellaro, who wrote and directed every episode, and provided the voices of several characters. The series was inspired by the Space Ghost Coast to Coast episode "Baffler Meal", which was not produced until after Aqua Teen Hunger Force premiered and did not air until 2003. Seasons 8–11 were each given a different alternative title, as a running gag from series creators, who wanted to try to change things in the series. Each alternatively titled season features different theme music from various composers.

On April 13, 2007, a feature film based on the series, Aqua Teen Hunger Force Colon Movie Film for Theaters, premiered in theaters, marking the first time an original Adult Swim series was adapted into a feature-length film. A second film, entitled Aqua Teen Forever: Plantasm, was released direct-to-video on November 8, 2022, and later Max on February 8, 2023.

The series also airs in syndication outside the United States and has been released on various DVD sets and other forms of home media, including on-demand streaming.

== Series overview ==
Series overview
| Season | Episodes | | Originally released | | | Alternate title |
| Season | Episodes | | First released | Last released | Network | Alternate title |
|---|---|---|---|---|---|---|
| 1 | 18 | 1 | December 30, 2000 | | Cartoon Network | |
| 1 | 18 | 17 | September 9, 2001 | December 29, 2002 | Adult Swim | N/A |
| 2 | 24 | | May 25, 2003 | December 31, 2003 | Adult Swim | N/A |
| 3 | 13 | | April 25, 2004 | October 24, 2004 | Adult Swim | N/A |
| 4 | 13 | | December 4, 2005 | December 22, 2006 | Adult Swim | N/A |
| 5 | 10 | | January 20, 2008 | March 23, 2008 | Adult Swim | N/A |
| 6 | 10 | | March 29, 2009 | May 31, 2009 | Adult Swim | N/A |
| 7 | 12 | | December 13, 2009 | May 2, 2010 | Adult Swim | N/A |
| 8 | 10 | | May 8, 2011 | July 24, 2011 | Adult Swim | Aqua Unit Patrol Squad 1 |
| 9 | 10 | | June 24, 2012 | August 26, 2012 | Adult Swim | Aqua Something You Know Whatever |
| 10 | 10 | | August 11, 2013 | October 20, 2013 | Adult Swim | Aqua TV Show Show |
| 11 | 9 | | June 21, 2015 | August 30, 2015 | Adult Swim | Aqua Teen Hunger Force Forever |
| 12 | 5 | | November 26, 2023 | December 17, 2023 | Adult Swim | N/A |
| Shorts | 10 | | April 18, 2022 | April 28, 2022 | YouTube | Aquadonk Side Pieces |
| Films | 2 | | April 13, 2007 | November 8, 2022 | Adult Swim (TV airings) | N/A |

== Episodes ==
=== Season 1 (2000–02) ===
| No. overall | No. in season | Title | Directed by | Written by | Original release date | Prod. code |
|---|---|---|---|---|---|---|
| 1 | 1 | "Rabbot" | Dave Willis & Matt Maiellaro | Dave Willis & Matt Maiellaro | December 30, 2000 (on Cartoon Network); September 16, 2001 (on Adult Swim) | 101 |
| 2 | 2 | "Escape from Leprechaupolis" | Dave Willis & Matt Maiellaro | Dave Willis & Matt Maiellaro | September 9, 2001 | 102 |
| 3 | 3 | "Bus of the Undead" | Dave Willis & Matt Maiellaro | Dave Willis & Matt Maiellaro | September 30, 2001 | 103 |
| 4 | 4 | "Mayhem of the Mooninites" | Dave Willis & Matt Maiellaro | Dave Willis & Matt Maiellaro | October 14, 2001 | 104 |
| 5 | 5 | "Balloonenstein" | Dave Willis & Matt Maiellaro | Dave Willis & Matt Maiellaro | December 23, 2001 | 105 |
| 6 | 6 | "Space Conflict from Beyond Pluto" | Dave Willis & Matt Maiellaro | Dave Willis & Matt Maiellaro | April 7, 2002 | 106 |
| 7 | 7 | "Ol' Drippy" | Dave Willis & Matt Maiellaro | Dave Willis & Matt Maiellaro | April 21, 2002 | 107 |
| 8 | 8 | "Revenge of the Mooninites" | Dave Willis & Matt Maiellaro | Dave Willis & Matt Maiellaro | May 5, 2002 | 108 |
| 9 | 9 | "MC Pee Pants" | Dave Willis & Matt Maiellaro | Dave Willis & Matt Maiellaro | May 19, 2002 | 109 |
| 10 | 10 | "Circus" | Dave Willis & Matt Maiellaro | Dave Willis & Matt Maiellaro | November 17, 2002 | 110 |
| 11 | 11 | "Dumber Days" | Dave Willis & Matt Maiellaro | Dave Willis & Matt Maiellaro | December 1, 2002 | 111 |
| 12 | 12 | "Love Mummy" | Dave Willis & Matt Maiellaro | Dave Willis & Matt Maiellaro | November 24, 2002 | 112 |
| 13 | 13 | "Dumber Dolls" | Dave Willis & Matt Maiellaro | Dave Willis & Matt Maiellaro | November 3, 2002 | 113 |
| 14 | 14 | "Interfection" | Dave Willis & Matt Maiellaro | Dave Willis & Matt Maiellaro | December 8, 2002 | 114 |
| 15 | 15 | "Bad Replicant" | Dave Willis & Matt Maiellaro | Dave Willis & Matt Maiellaro | November 10, 2002 | 115 |
| 16 | 16 | "PDA" | Dave Willis & Matt Maiellaro | Dave Willis & Matt Maiellaro | December 15, 2002 | 116 |
| 17 | 17 | "Mail-Order Bride" | Dave Willis & Matt Maiellaro | Dave Willis & Matt Maiellaro | December 22, 2002 | 117 |
| 18 | 18 | "Cybernetic Ghost of Christmas Past from the Future" | Dave Willis & Matt Maiellaro | Dave Willis & Matt Maiellaro | December 29, 2002 | 118 |

=== Season 2 (2003) ===
| No. overall | No. in season | Title | Directed by | Written by | Original release date | Prod. code |
|---|---|---|---|---|---|---|
| 19 | 1 | "Super Computer" | Dave Willis & Matt Maiellaro | Dave Willis & Matt Maiellaro | June 15, 2003 | 201 |
| 20 | 2 | "Super Birthday Snake" | Dave Willis & Matt Maiellaro | Dave Willis & Matt Maiellaro | May 25, 2003 | 202 |
| 21 | 3 | "Super Bowl" | Dave Willis & Matt Maiellaro | Dave Willis & Matt Maiellaro | June 8, 2003 | 203 |
| 22 | 4 | "Super Hero" | Dave Willis & Matt Maiellaro | Dave Willis & Matt Maiellaro | June 1, 2003 | 204 |
| 23 | 5 | "Super Model" | Dave Willis & Matt Maiellaro | Dave Willis & Matt Maiellaro | June 22, 2003 | 205 |
| 24 | 6 | "Super Spore" | Dave Willis & Matt Maiellaro | Dave Willis & Matt Maiellaro | June 29, 2003 | 206 |
| 25 | 7 | "Super Sirloin" | Dave Willis & Matt Maiellaro | Dave Willis & Matt Maiellaro | August 31, 2003 | 207 |
| 26 | 8 | "Super Squatter" | Dave Willis & Matt Maiellaro | Dave Willis & Matt Maiellaro | September 7, 2003 | 208 |
| 27 | 9 | "Super Trivia" | Dave Willis & Matt Maiellaro | Dave Willis & Matt Maiellaro | September 21, 2003 | 209 |
| 28 | 10 | "Broodwich" | Dave Willis & Matt Maiellaro | Dave Willis & Matt Maiellaro | November 2, 2003 | 210 |
| 29 | 11 | "The Meat Zone" | Dave Willis & Matt Maiellaro | Dave Willis & Matt Maiellaro | September 14, 2003 | 211 |
| 30 | 12 | "Universal Remonster" | Dave Willis & Matt Maiellaro | Dave Willis & Matt Maiellaro | September 28, 2003 | 212 |
| 31 | 13 | "Total Re-Carl" | Dave Willis & Matt Maiellaro | Dave Willis & Matt Maiellaro | October 5, 2003 | 213 |
| 32 | 14 | "Revenge of the Trees" | Dave Willis & Matt Maiellaro | Dave Willis & Matt Maiellaro | October 12, 2003 | 214 |
| 33 | 15 | "Frat Aliens" | Dave Willis & Matt Maiellaro | Dave Willis & Matt Maiellaro | November 30, 2003 | 215 |
| 34 | 16 | "Spirit Journey Formation Anniversary" | Dave Willis & Matt Maiellaro | Dave Willis & Matt Maiellaro | October 19, 2003 | 216 |
| 35 | 17 | "Kidney Car" | Dave Willis & Matt Maiellaro | Dave Willis & Matt Maiellaro | November 16, 2003 | 217 |
| 36 | 18 | "The Cubing" | Dave Willis & Matt Maiellaro | Dave Willis & Matt Maiellaro | November 23, 2003 | 218 |
| 37 | 19 | "The Shaving" | Dave Willis & Matt Maiellaro | Dave Willis & Matt Maiellaro | October 26, 2003 | 219 |
| 38 | 20 | "The Clowning" | Dave Willis & Matt Maiellaro | Dave Willis & Matt Maiellaro | December 7, 2003 | 220 |
| 39 | 21 | "The Dressing" | Dave Willis & Matt Maiellaro | Dave Willis & Matt Maiellaro | December 14, 2003 | 221 |
| 40 | 22 | "The" | Dave Willis & Matt Maiellaro | Dave Willis & Matt Maiellaro | December 21, 2003 | 222 |
| 41 | 23 | "The Cloning" | Dave Willis & Matt Maiellaro | Dave Willis & Matt Maiellaro | December 31, 2003 | 223 |
| 42 | 24 | "The Last One" | Dave Willis & Matt Maiellaro | Dave Willis & Matt Maiellaro | December 31, 2003 | 224 |

=== Season 3 (2004) ===
| No. overall | No. in season | Title | Directed by | Written by | Original release date | Prod. code |
|---|---|---|---|---|---|---|
| 43 | 1 | "Video Ouija" | Dave Willis & Matt Maiellaro | Dave Willis & Matt Maiellaro | April 25, 2004 | 301 |
| 44 | 2 | "Unremarkable Voyage" | Dave Willis & Matt Maiellaro | Dave Willis & Matt Maiellaro | May 9, 2004 | 302 |
| 45 | 3 | "Remooned" "Mooninites 3: Remooned" | Dave Willis & Matt Maiellaro | Dave Willis & Matt Maiellaro | August 15, 2004 | 303 |
| 46 | 4 | "Gee Whiz" | Dave Willis & Matt Maiellaro | Dave Willis & Matt Maiellaro | August 22, 2004 | 304 |
| 47 | 5 | "eDork" | Dave Willis & Matt Maiellaro | Dave Willis & Matt Maiellaro | August 29, 2004 | 305 |
| 48 | 6 | "Robositter" | Dave Willis & Matt Maiellaro | Dave Willis & Matt Maiellaro | September 12, 2004 | 306 |
| 49 | 7 | "Little Brittle" | Dave Willis & Matt Maiellaro | Dave Willis & Matt Maiellaro | September 5, 2004 | 307 |
| 50 | 8 | "Moon Master" "Mooninites 4: The Final Mooning" | Dave Willis & Matt Maiellaro | Dave Willis & Matt Maiellaro | September 19, 2004 | 308 |
| 51 | 9 | "Dusty Gozongas" | Dave Willis & Matt Maiellaro | Dave Willis & Matt Maiellaro | October 3, 2004 | 309 |
| 52 | 10 | "Diet" "The South Bronx Paradise Diet" | Dave Willis & Matt Maiellaro | Dave Willis & Matt Maiellaro | September 26, 2004 | 310 |
| 53 | 11 | "T-Shirt of the Living Dead" "T-Shirt of the Dead" | Dave Willis & Matt Maiellaro | Dave Willis & Matt Maiellaro | October 10, 2004 | 311 |
| 54 | 12 | "Hypno-Germ" | Dave Willis & Matt Maiellaro | Dave Willis & Matt Maiellaro | October 17, 2004 | 312 |
| 55 | 13 | "Carl" "Spacegate World" | Dave Willis & Matt Maiellaro | Dave Willis & Matt Maiellaro | October 24, 2004 | 313 |

=== Season 4 (2005–06) ===
| No. overall | No. in season | Title | Directed by | Written by | Original release date | Prod. code |
|---|---|---|---|---|---|---|
| 56 | 1 | "Dirtfoot" | Dave Willis & Matt Maiellaro | Dave Willis & Matt Maiellaro | December 4, 2005 | 401 |
| 57 | 2 | "Boost Mobile" | Dave Willis & Matt Maiellaro | Dave Willis & Matt Maiellaro | December 11, 2005 | 402 |
| 58 | 3 | "Deleted Scenes" "Star Studded Xmas Spectacular" "Star Studded Christmas Spectacular Starring Rhon Geremi" | Dave Willis & Matt Maiellaro | Dave Willis & Matt Maiellaro | December 18, 2005 | 403 |
| 59 | 4 | "Dickesode" | Dave Willis & Matt Maiellaro | Dave Willis & Matt Maiellaro | October 22, 2006 | 404 |
| 60 | 5 | "Handbanana" | Dave Willis & Matt Maiellaro | Dave Willis & Matt Maiellaro | October 29, 2006 | 405 |
| 61 | 6 | "Party All the Time" | Dave Willis & Matt Maiellaro | Dave Willis & Matt Maiellaro | November 5, 2006 | 406 |
| 62 | 7 | "Bart Oates" | Dave Willis & Matt Maiellaro | Dave Willis & Matt Maiellaro | December 3, 2006 | 407 |
| 63 | 8 | "Global Grilling" | Dave Willis & Matt Maiellaro | Dave Willis & Matt Maiellaro | November 12, 2006 | 408 |
| 64 | 9 | "Grim Reaper Gutters" | Dave Willis & Matt Maiellaro | Dave Willis & Matt Maiellaro | November 19, 2006 | 409 |
| 65 | 10 | "Moonajuana" | Dave Willis & Matt Maiellaro | Dave Willis & Matt Maiellaro | November 26, 2006 | 410 |
| 66 | 11 | "Ezekial" | Dave Willis & Matt Maiellaro | Dave Willis & Matt Maiellaro | December 17, 2006 | 411 |
| 67 | 12 | "Antenna" | Dave Willis & Matt Maiellaro | Dave Willis & Matt Maiellaro | December 10, 2006 | 412 |
| 68 | 13 | "Carl Wash" | Dave Willis & Matt Maiellaro | Dave Willis & Matt Maiellaro | December 21, 2006 (stealth, unfinished); March 25, 2007 (official) | 413 |

=== Season 5 (2008) ===
| No. overall | No. in season | Title | Directed by | Written by | Original release date | Prod. code |
|---|---|---|---|---|---|---|
| 69 | 1 | "Boston" | Dave Willis & Matt Maiellaro | Dave Willis & Matt Maiellaro | Unaired | 501 |
| 70 | 2 | "Robots Everywhere" | Dave Willis & Matt Maiellaro | Dave Willis & Matt Maiellaro | November 5, 2007 (video game special feature); January 20, 2008 (TV) | 502 |
| 71 | 3 | "Sirens" | Dave Willis & Matt Maiellaro | Dave Willis & Matt Maiellaro | January 27, 2008 | 503 |
| 72 | 4 | "Couples Skate" | Dave Willis & Matt Maiellaro | Dave Willis & Matt Maiellaro | February 3, 2008 | 507 |
| 73 | 5 | "Reedickyoulus" | Dave Willis & Matt Maiellaro | Dave Willis & Matt Maiellaro | February 10, 2008 | 504 |
| 74 | 6 | "Hoppy Bunny" | Dave Willis & Matt Maiellaro | Dave Willis & Matt Maiellaro | February 17, 2008 | 505 |
| 75 | 7 | "Laser Lenses" | Dave Willis & Matt Maiellaro | Dave Willis & Matt Maiellaro | March 2, 2008 | 506 |
| 76 | 8 | "Dummy Love" | Dave Willis & Matt Maiellaro | Dave Willis & Matt Maiellaro | March 9, 2008 | 508 |
| 77 | 9 | "The Marines" | Dave Willis & Matt Maiellaro | Dave Willis & Matt Maiellaro | March 16, 2008 | 509 |
| 78 | 10 | "Bible Fruit" "Fruits" | Dave Willis & Matt Maiellaro | Dave Willis & Matt Maiellaro | March 23, 2008 | 510 |

=== Season 6 (2009) ===
| No. overall | No. in season | Title | Directed by | Written by | Original release date | Prod. code |
|---|---|---|---|---|---|---|
| 79 | 1 | "Gene E" | Dave Willis & Matt Maiellaro | Dave Willis & Matt Maiellaro | December 16, 2008 (DVD); March 29, 2009 (TV) | 601 |
| 80 | 2 | "Shake Like Me" | Dave Willis & Matt Maiellaro | Dave Willis & Matt Maiellaro | December 16, 2008 (DVD); April 5, 2009 (TV) | 602 |
| 81 | 3 | "She Creature" | Dave Willis & Matt Maiellaro | Dave Willis & Matt Maiellaro | December 16, 2008 (DVD); April 12, 2009 (TV) | 603 |
| 82 | 4 | "Chick Magnet" | Dave Willis & Matt Maiellaro | Dave Willis & Matt Maiellaro | December 16, 2008 (DVD); April 19, 2009 (TV) | 604 |
| 83 | 5 | "The Creature from Plaque Lagoon" | Dave Willis & Matt Maiellaro | Dave Willis & Matt Maiellaro | April 26, 2009 | 605 |
| 84 | 6 | "Time Machine" | Dave Willis & Matt Maiellaro | Dave Willis & Matt Maiellaro | May 3, 2009 | 606 |
| 85 | 7 | "2-and-a-Half-Star Wars Out of Five" | Dave Willis & Matt Maiellaro | Dave Willis & Matt Maiellaro | May 10, 2009 | 607 |
| 86 | 8 | "Fry Legs" | Dave Willis & Matt Maiellaro | Dave Willis & Matt Maiellaro | May 17, 2009 | 608 |
| 87 | 9 | "Der Inflatable Fuhrer" | Dave Willis & Matt Maiellaro | Dave Willis & Matt Maiellaro | May 24, 2009 | 609 |
| 88 | 10 | "Last Last One Forever and Ever" "Live Action" | Dave Willis & Matt Maiellaro | Dave Willis & Matt Maiellaro | May 31, 2009 | 610 |

=== Season 7 (2009–10) ===
| No. overall | No. in season | Title | Directed by | Written by | Original release date | Prod. code |
|---|---|---|---|---|---|---|
| 89 | 1 | "A PE Christmas" | Dave Willis & Matt Maiellaro | Dave Willis & Matt Maiellaro | December 13, 2009 | 701 |
| 90 | 2 | "Rabbot Redux" | Dave Willis & Matt Maiellaro | Dave Willis & Mattimorph Maiellarodyne | February 7, 2010 | 702 |
| 91 | 3 | "Rubberman" | Dave Willis & Matt Maiellaro | Dave Willis & Matt Maiellaro | February 14, 2010 | 703 |
| 92 | 4 | "Eggball" | Dave Willis & Matt Maiellaro | Dave Willis & Matt Maiellaro | February 21, 2010 | 704 |
| 93 | 5 | "Monster" | Dave Willis & Matt Maiellaro | Dave Willis & Matt Maiellaro | February 28, 2010 | 705 |
| 94 | 6 | "Hands On a Hamburger" | Dave Willis & Matt Maiellaro | Dave Willis & Matt Maiellaro | March 21, 2010 | 706 |
| 95 | 7 | "IAMAPOD" | Dave Willis & Matt Maiellaro | Dave Willis & Matt Maiellaro | March 28, 2010 | 707 |
| 96 | 8 | "Juggalo" | Dave Willis & Matt Maiellaro | Dave Willis & Matt Maiellaro | April 4, 2010 | 708 |
| 97 | 9 | "Multiple Meat" | Dave Willis & Matt Maiellaro | Dave Willis & Matt Maiellaro | April 11, 2010 | 709 |
| 98 | 10 | "Kangarilla and the Magic Tarantula" | Dave Willis & Matt Maiellaro | Dave Willis & Matt Maiellaro | April 18, 2010 | 710 |
| 99 | 11 | "Larry Miller Hair System" | Dave Willis & Matt Maiellaro | Dave Willis & Matt Maiellaro | April 25, 2010 | 711 |
| 100 | 12 | "One Hundred" | Dave Willis & Matt Maiellaro | Dave Willis, Comedian Matt "Craig Hartin Fan Club" Maiellaro, Mike Geier & Chris Ward | May 2, 2010 | 712 |

=== Season 8: Aqua Unit Patrol Squad 1 (2011) ===
| No. overall | No. in season | Title | Directed by | Written by | Original release date | Prod. code |
|---|---|---|---|---|---|---|
| 101 | 1 | "Allen Part One" | Dave Willis & Matt Maiellaro | Dave Willis, Matt Maiellaro, Josh Homme & Alain Johannes | May 8, 2011 | 1001 |
| 102 | 2 | "Allen Part Two" | Dave Willis & Matt Maiellaro | Dave Willis, Matt Maiellaro, Josh Hemme & Alain Johannes | May 15, 2011 | 1002 |
| 103 | 3 | "The Intervention" | Dave Willis & Matt Maiellaro | Dave Willis, Matt Maiellaro, Josh Hemme & Alain Johannes | May 22, 2011 | 1004 |
| 104 | 4 | "Freedom Cobra" | Dave Willis & Matt Maiellaro | Dave Willis, Matt Maiellaro, Josh Hemme & Alain Johannes | June 5, 2011 | 1003 |
| 105 | 5 | "The Creditor" | Dave Willis & Matt Maiellaro | Dave Willis, Matt Maiellaro, Josh Hemme & Alain Johannes | June 12, 2011 | 1005 |
| 106 | 6 | "Vampirus" | Dave Willis & Matt Maiellaro | Dave Willis, Matt Maiellaro, Josh Hemme & Alain Johannes | June 19, 2011 | 1006 |
| 107 | 7 | "Wi-tri" | Dave Willis & Matt Maiellaro | Dave Willis, Matt Maiellaro, Josh Hemme & Alain Johannes | June 26, 2011 | 1008 |
| 108 | 8 | "Jumpy George" | Dave Willis & Matt Maiellaro | Dave Willis, Matt Maiellaro, Josh Hemme & Alain Johannes | July 10, 2011 | 1009 |
| 109 | 9 | "Lasagna" | Dave Willis & Matt Maiellaro | Dave Willis, Matt Maiellaro, Josh Hemme & Alain Johannes | July 17, 2011 | 1010 |
| 110 | 10 | "Last Dance for Napkin Lad" | Dave Willis & Matt Maiellaro | Dave Willis, Matt Maiellaro, Josh Hemme & Alain Johannes | July 24, 2011 | 1007 |

=== Season 9: Aqua Something You Know Whatever (2012) ===
| No. overall | No. in season | Title | Directed by | Written by | Original release date | Prod. code | US viewers (millions) |
|---|---|---|---|---|---|---|---|
| 111 | 1 | "Big Bro" "The Iron Will" | Dave Willis & Matt Maiellaro | Dave Willis, Matt Maiellaro, Schoolly D and Mariachi El Bronx | June 24, 2012 | 1102 | 1.24 |
| 112 | 2 | "Chicken and Beans" | Dave Willis & Matt Maiellaro | Dave Willis, Matt Maiellaro, Schoolly D and Mariachi El Bronx | July 1, 2012 | 1101 | 1.06 |
| 113 | 3 | "Shirt Herpes" | Dave Willis & Matt Maiellaro | Dave Willis, Matt Maiellaro, Schoolly D and Mariachi El Bronx | July 8, 2012 | 1103 | 1.25 |
| 114 | 4 | "Rocket Horse & Jet Chicken" | Dave Willis & Matt Maiellaro | Dave Willis, Matt Maiellaro, Schoolly D, Mariachi El Bronx and Dana Snyder | July 15, 2012 | 1105 | 1.21 |
| 115 | 5 | "The Granite Family" | Dave Willis & Matt Maiellaro | Dave Willis, Matt Maiellaro, Schoolly D and Mariachi El Bronx | July 22, 2012 | 1106 | 1.33 |
| 116 | 6 | "Bookie" | Dave Willis & Matt Maiellaro | Dave Willis, Matt Maiellaro, Schoolly D and Mariachi El Bronx | July 29, 2012 | 1107 | 1.19 |
| 117 | 7 | "Fightan Titan" | Dave Willis & Matt Maiellaro | Dave Willis, Matt Maiellaro, Schoolly D and Mariachi El Bronx | August 5, 2012 | 1104 | 1.28 |
| 118 | 8 | "Buddy Nugget" | Dave Willis & Matt Maiellaro | Dave Willis, Matt Maiellaro, Schoolly D and Mariachi El Bronx | August 12, 2012 | 1108 | 1.19 |
| 119 | 9 | "Zucotti Manicotti" | Dave Willis & Matt Maiellaro | Dave Willis, Matt Maiellaro, Schoolly D, Mariachi El Bronx and Nick Ingkatanuwat | August 19, 2012 | 1110 | 1.18 |
| 120 | 10 | "Totem Pole" | Dave Willis & Matt Maiellaro | Dave Willis, Matt Maiellaro, Schoolly D and Mariachi El Bronx | August 26, 2012 | 1109 | 1.30 |

=== Season 10: Aqua TV Show Show (2013) ===
| No. overall | No. in season | Title | Directed by | Written by | Original release date | Prod. code | US viewers (millions) |
|---|---|---|---|---|---|---|---|
| 121 | 1 | "Muscles" | Dave Willis & Matt Maiellaro | Dave Willis & Matt Maiellaro | August 11, 2013 | 1205 | 1.46 |
| 122 | 2 | "The Dudies" | Dave Willis & Matt Maiellaro | Dave Willis & Matt Maiellaro | August 18, 2013 | 1202 | 1.38 |
| 123 | 3 | "Merlo Sauvignon Blanco" | Dave Willis & Matt Maiellaro | Dave Willis & Matt Maiellaro | August 25, 2013 | 1204 | 1.49 |
| 124 | 4 | "Banana Planet" | Dave Willis & Matt Maiellaro | Dave Willis & Matt Maiellaro | September 8, 2013 | 1206 | 1.42 |
| 125 | 5 | "Working Stiffs" | Dave Willis & Matt Maiellaro | Dave Willis & Matt Maiellaro | September 15, 2013 | 1203 | 1.52 |
| 126 | 6 | "Skins" | Dave Willis & Matt Maiellaro | Dave Willis & Matt Maiellaro | September 22, 2013 | 1207 | 0.89 |
| 127 | 7 | "Freda" | Dave Willis & Matt Maiellaro | Dave Willis & Matt Maiellaro | September 29, 2013 | 1209 | 1.09 |
| 128 | 8 | "Storage Zeebles" | Dave Willis & Matt Maiellaro | Dave Willis & Matt Maiellaro | October 6, 2013 | 1210 | 1.03 |
| 129 | 9 | "Piranha Germs" | Dave Willis & Matt Maiellaro | Dave Willis & Matt Maiellaro | October 13, 2013 | 1208 | 1.24 |
| 130 | 10 | "Spacecadeuce" | Dave Willis & Matt Maiellaro | Dave Willis & Matt Maiellaro | October 20, 2013 | 1201 | 1.00 |

=== Season 11: Aqua Teen Hunger Force Forever (2015) ===
| No. overall | No. in season | Title | Directed by | Written by | Original release date | Prod. code | US viewers (millions) |
|---|---|---|---|---|---|---|---|
| 131 | 1 | "Mouth Quest" | Dave Willis, Matt Maiellaro & Craig Hartin | Dave Willis & Matt Maiellaro | June 21, 2015 | 1301 | 0.81 |
| 132 | 2 | "Brain Fairy" | Dave Willis & Matt Maiellaro | Dave Willis & Matt Maiellaro | June 28, 2015 | 1302 | 0.89 |
| 133 | 3 | "The Hairy Bus" | Dave Willis & Matt Maiellaro | Dave Willis & Matt Maiellaro | July 12, 2015 | 1303 | 0.85 |
| 134 | 4 | "Sweet C" | Dave Willis & Matt Maiellaro | Dave Willis & Matt Maiellaro | July 19, 2015 | 1304 | 1.10 |
| 135 | 5 | "Knapsack!" | Dave Willis & Matt Maiellaro | Dave Willis & Matt Maiellaro | July 26, 2015 | 1305 | 1.15 |
| 136 | 6 | "Rabbit, Not Rabbot" | Dave Willis & Matt Maiellaro | Dave Willis & Matt Maiellaro | August 2, 2015 | 1306 | 1.20 |
| 137 | 7 | "Hospice" | Dave Willis & Matt Maiellaro | Dave Willis & Matt Maiellaro | August 16, 2015 | 1307 | 1.14 |
| 138 | 8 | "The Last One Forever and Ever (For Real This Time) (We ****ing Mean It)" | Dave Willis & Matt Maiellaro | Dave Willis & Matt Maiellaro | August 23, 2015 | 1308 1309 | 1.59 |
| 139 | 9 | "The Greatest Story Ever Told" | Dave Willis & Matt Maiellaro | Dave Willis & Matt Maiellaro | August 26, 2015 (online); August 30, 2015 (TV) | 1310 | 1.23 |

=== Season 12 (2023) ===
| No. overall | No. in season | Title | Directed by | Written by | Original release date | Prod. code | US viewers (millions) |
|---|---|---|---|---|---|---|---|
| 140 | 1 | "Shaketopia" | Dave Willis & Matt Maiellaro | Dave Willis & Matt Maiellaro | November 26, 2023 | 1401 | 0.31 |
| 141 | 2 | "A Quiet Shake" | Dave Willis & Matt Maiellaro | Dave Willis & Matt Maiellaro | November 26, 2023 | 1402 | 0.28 |
| 142 | 3 | "Scrip2 2i2le: The Ts Are 2s" | Dave Willis & Matt Maiellaro | Dave Willis & Matt Maiellaro | December 3, 2023 | 1403 | 0.27 |
| 143 | 4 | "Get Lit Upon a Situpon" | Dave Willis & Matt Maiellaro | Dave Willis & Matt Maiellaro | December 10, 2023 | 1404 | 0.20 |
| 144 | 5 | "Anubis" | Dave Willis & Matt Maiellaro | Dave Willis & Matt Maiellaro | December 17, 2023 | 1405 | 0.32 |

== Aquadonk Side Pieces shorts (2022) ==
| No. | Title | Directed by | Written by | Original release date |
|---|---|---|---|---|
| 1 | "The Return of Handbanana" | Dave Willis & Matt Maiellaro | Dave Willis & Matt Maiellaro | April 18, 2022 |
| 2 | "The Broodwrap" | Dave Willis & Matt Maiellaro | Dave Willis & Matt Maiellaro | April 19, 2022 |
| 3 | "MC P Pants University" | Dave Willis & Matt Maiellaro | Dave Willis & Matt Maiellaro | April 20, 2022 |
| 4 | "Moon Master 9: Beware the Gorgotron" | Dave Willis & Matt Maiellaro | Dave Willis & Matt Maiellaro | April 21, 2022 |
| 5 | "Frat Aliens: Hell Week" | Dave Willis & Matt Maiellaro | Dave Willis & Matt Maiellaro | April 22, 2022 |
| 6 | "Breakie B" | Dave Willis & Matt Maiellaro | Dave Willis & Matt Maiellaro | April 23, 2022 |
| 7 | "Markula the Slumlord" | Dave Willis & Matt Maiellaro | Dave Willis & Matt Maiellaro | April 24, 2022 |
| 8 | "Merlo's Revenge" | Dave Willis & Matt Maiellaro | Dave Willis & Matt Maiellaro | April 25, 2022 |
| 9 | "The Dumbest Doll of All" | Dave Willis & Matt Maiellaro | Dave Willis & Matt Maiellaro | April 26, 2022 |
| 10 | "Handbanana's Demise" | Dave Willis & Matt Maiellaro | Dave Willis & Matt Maiellaro | April 28, 2022 |

== Films ==
| Title | Directed by | Written by | Original release date (U.S.) |
|---|---|---|---|
| Aqua Teen Hunger Force Colon Movie Film for Theaters | Matt Maiellaro and Dave Willis | Dave Willis, Matt Maiellaro and Jay Wade Edwards | April 13, 2007 |
| Aqua Teen Forever: Plantasm | Matt Maiellaro and Dave Willis | Matt Maiellaro and Dave Willis | November 8, 2022 |

== See also ==
- Aqua Teen Hunger Force Colon Movie Film for Theaters
- Aqua Teen Forever: Plantasm
- "Baffler Meal"
