= Bibble =

Bibble or Bibbles may refer to:

- Bibble (software), a digital imaging program for multiple platforms
- Bibbles Bawel (born 1930), American football player
- Sio Bibble, a character in the Star Wars franchise
- Bibble, New South Wales, an Australian parish partially in Finch County
- "Bibbles", a poem by D. H. Lawrence in his anthology Birds, Beasts and Flowers
- Bibble, a fictional character in the Canadian T. V. show "Polka Dot Shorts"
- Bibble, a fictional character voiced by Lee Tockar in the Barbie animated film series
- Bibble, a fictional snack in some episodes of the American sitcoms Victorious and Sam & Cat
- The Bibble, by the "Almighty Jimmy", is a parody of The Bible that appears in the episode "The Greatest Story Ever Told" from the TV series Aqua Teen Hunger Force
