= Aqua Teen Hunger Force season 10 =

Aqua Teen Hunger Force
- Season 10
- The Aqua TV Show Show title card used for the tenth season.
- Starring: Dana Snyder; Carey Means; Dave Willis
- No. of episodes: 10

Release
- Original network: Adult Swim
- Original release: August 11 – October 20, 2013

Season chronology
- ← Previous; Season 9 Next → Season 11

The tenth season of the animated television series Aqua Teen Hunger Force, alternatively titled Aqua TV Show Show, aired in the United States on Cartoon Network's late night programming block, Adult Swim. The season started on August 11, 2013 with "Muscles" and ended with "Spacecadeuce" on October 20, 2013, with a total of ten episodes. The show is about the surreal adventures and antics of three anthropomorphic fast food items: Master Shake, Frylock, and Meatwad, who live together as roommates and frequently interact with their human next-door neighbor, Carl. In May 2015, this season became available on Hulu Plus.

Episodes in this season were written and directed by Dave Willis and Matt Maiellaro. The theme music was composed by Flying Lotus. Almost every episode in this season featured a special guest appearance, which continues a practice used in past seasons. This season has been released in various forms of home media, including on demand streaming.

== Production ==
Every episode in this season was written and directed by series creators Dave Willis and Matt Maiellaro, who have both written and directed every episode of the series. All episodes originally aired in the United States on Cartoon Network's late night programming block, Adult Swim.

The opening theme entitled "Aqua Teen 24" and the closing theme entitled "Chasing Apples" were both composed by American alternative hip hop producer Flying Lotus, who has worked with Adult Swim several times over the years. Both songs were formally released on the Ideas+drafts+loops mixtape on December 10, 2013, including the instrumental for "Aqua Teen 24".

== Cast ==
=== Main ===
- Dana Snyder as Master Shake
- Carey Means as Frylock
- Dave Willis as Meatwad, Carl and Ignignokt

=== Recurring ===
- Matt Maiellaro as Err
- George Lowe as Bruno Sardine
- Andy Merrill as Oglethorpe
- Mike Schatz as Emory

=== Guest appearances ===
- John DiMaggio as Master Shake's muscles (credited as "Johnny Dee")
- Schoolly D as Himself in "Muscles"
- Phillip Tallman as Salesman in "The Dudies"
- Henry Zebrowski as Merlo in "Merlo Sauvignon Blanco"
- Lavell Crawford as Unbelievable Ron in "Merlo Sauvignon Blanco"
- Matt Besser as Chimp Alien (credited as "Matt Bessar") in "Banana Planet"
- Lavell Crawford as Chimp Alien in "Banana Planet"
- Curtis Gwinn as Chimp Alien (credited as "Curjay Gwinn") in "Banana Planet"
- Wendy Cross in "Working Stiffs"
- Dana Swanson in "Working Stiffs"
- Jim Florentine as a restaurant manager in "Working Stiffs"
- Patrick Byrne in "Working Stiffs"
- Josh Warren in "Skins"
- Thomas Decoud in "Skins"
- Mary Kraft in "Skins"
- T.M. Levin in "Skins"
- Rob Kutner as in "Skins"
- Senor Negotio in "Skins"
- Casey Wilson as Freda (credited as "Rose Higdon") in "Freda"
- Bobcat Goldthwait as Zingo in "Storage Zeebles"
- Mary Mack as Zaffy in "Storage Zeebles"
- Bobby Moynihan as Zarfonius in "Storage Zeebles"
- Paul Painter as Wise and All-Knowing Bush in "Storage Zeebles"
- Paul Rust as Zorf in "Storage Zeebles"
- François Chau as Bill (credited as "Dr. Marvin Candle") in "Storage Zeebles"
- Brian Stack as Don in "Piranha Germs"
- Rob Poynter in "Piranha Germs"

== Episodes ==
No. overall	No. in season	Title	Directed by	Written by	Original release date	Prod. code	US viewers (millions)
121	1	"Muscles"	Dave Willis & Matt Maiellaro	Dave Willis & Matt Maiellaro	August 11, 2013	1205	1.46
After experiencing a stroke, Master Shake decides to turn his life around by getting in shape. However, Shake's muscles become sentient and commit crimes while he sleeps. Guest appearance: John DiMaggio as Master Shake's muscles (credited as "Johnny Dee")
122	2	"The Dudies"	Dave Willis & Matt Maiellaro	Dave Willis & Matt Maiellaro	August 18, 2013	1202	1.38
Master Shake competes with Meatwad and Carl to win a "Dudie Award", which turns out to be a scam to sell condos. Guest appearance: Phillip Tallman as the condo salesman
123	3	"Merlo Sauvignon Blanco"	Dave Willis & Matt Maiellaro	Dave Willis & Matt Maiellaro	August 25, 2013	1204	1.49
Master Shake's addiction to shellfish begins to take a severe toll on his health, so Frylock convinces him to seek professional (and inexpensive) help from a therapist-cum-magician whose unconventional treatments belie questionable motives. Guest appearances: Henry Zebrowski as Merlo and Lavell Crawford as Unbelievable Ron
124	4	"Banana Planet"	Dave Willis & Matt Maiellaro	Dave Willis & Matt Maiellaro	September 8, 2013	1206	1.42
The Aqua Teens blast off in an illegal rocket to answer a distress signal from the mysterious Banana Planet. Meanwhile, Master Shake is preoccupied with a honeybaked ham. Guest appearances: Matt Besser (credited as "Matt Bessar"), Lavell Crawford, Curtis Gwinn (credited as "Curjay Gwinn") as the chimp aliens
125	5	"Working Stiffs"	Dave Willis & Matt Maiellaro	Dave Willis & Matt Maiellaro	September 15, 2013	1203	1.52
The Aqua Teens are unable to pay their cable bill due to Master Shake's financial negligence so Frylock has everyone seek jobs. He gains employment at a fast food establishment, while Meatwad and Shake get sucked into the seedy underworld of organized crime. Guest appearances: Jim Florentine as the manager, Dana Swanson and Wendy Cross
126	6	"Skins"	Dave Willis & Matt Maiellaro	Dave Willis & Matt Maiellaro	September 22, 2013	1207	0.89
Master Shake buys bongos from a hippie in order to join a drum circle. When played, the bongos summon a strange skinless creature with a tragic past. Guest appearances: Josh Warren, Thomas Decoud, Mary Kraft, T.M. Levin, and Rob Kutner
127	7	"Freda"	Dave Willis & Matt Maiellaro	Dave Willis & Matt Maiellaro	September 29, 2013	1209	1.09
While trying to explode ducks at the local park, Master Shake meets Freda, the woman of his dreams. However, he soon begins to feel the pangs of love, and ultimately, inevitable heartbreak, as the woman is not exactly what she seems. Guest appearance: Casey Wilson as Freda
128	8	"Storage Zeebles"	Dave Willis & Matt Maiellaro	Dave Willis & Matt Maiellaro	October 6, 2013	1210	1.03
Carl acquires a storage unit from his friend and invites Frylock to help examine its contents, only to discover the storage unit is a portal to another universe ruled by the mystical kingdom of the peaceful, woodland Zeebles. The Zeebles (consisting of King Zarfonius, Zorf, Zingo, Zaffy, and Bill) are willing to welcome Carl and make friends with him, even though they're aware of his unfriendliness, so they present him with a leaf collage as a present, which Carl couldn't care less about. Carl, eager to make money, begins draining the mythical land of its resources, such as cutting down all the trees, inviting rare game hunters to hunt down the magical animals, drilling for oil, and renting out the area for weddings. Upset about the current state of their kingdom, the Zeebles at-first decide to impeach "Carl the Difficult, Alcoholic, Unfriendly Giant", but Bill persistently suggests killing him, which is eventually agreed upon. The Zeebles decide to bake Zorf inside a Blister-berry pie with a knife and give it to Carl and for him to kill Carl when he goes to take a bite. The next day, Carl invites two soon-to-be-weds to the storage unit to scout the location for their wedding, where the Zeebles present Carl with the pie (which contains the outline of Zorf in the crust). Carl instantly suspects poison, so he forces Zarfonius to take the first bite, in which the Zeebles discover that Zorf died inside the pie when they baked it, which results in Carl poaching all the Blister-berries and inviting Zaffy back to his home so he can have his way with her. At Carl's pool, Frylock tries to reason with Carl to cease his imperialistic actions and to "leave those little people alone", which Carl turns down and decides to "steal their frickin' Sun". The Zeebles plot to attack and kill Carl using a taxidermy Moose-head, unfashionable neckties, burning baseball cards, an antique civil war musket, and old tax records (all raided from the neighboring storage units). Everything, however, doesn't even phase Carl and he unscrews the Sun from the ceiling/sky, which in turn summons a nocturnal creature called the Nightwolf which attacks Carl. Guest appearances: Bobcat Goldthwait as Zingo, Mary Mack as Zaffy, Bobby Moynihan as Zarfonius, Paul Painter as Wise and All-Knowing Bush, Paul Rust as Zorf, and François Chau (credited as "Dr. Marvin Candle") as Bill
129	9	"Piranha Germs"	Dave Willis & Matt Maiellaro	Dave Willis & Matt Maiellaro	October 13, 2013	1208	1.24
Master Shake gains employment at a shady company that literally practices viral marketing. Frylock becomes suspicious when Shake returns critically sick. Guest appearances: Brian Stack as Don, Rob Poynter
130	10	"Spacecadeuce"	Dave Willis & Matt Maiellaro	Dave Willis & Matt Maiellaro	October 20, 2013	1201	1.00
Emory and Oglethorpe, the Plutonians, awaken after months of hypersleep (which includes Oglethorpe being terrorized by a Xenomorph-like creature only to learn that the duplicitous Mooninites have conquered and enslaved their entire race. Now their leaders, Ignignokt and Err instruct Emory and Oglethorpe to investigate the S.S.S. Jon Don Ronald (a spaceship that resembles an ugly man wearing only briefs and socks) to recover three groups of explorers who've gone missing three months ago. The Mooninites also reveal that the ship is alive and carnivorous (but they're pretty sure it's sleeping), and is also not to be confused with its twinship, the S.S.S. Jon Ron Donald (an after-hours nightclub). Unfortunately, Ignignokt and Err can't tell the difference between the two, so Oglethorpe and Emory have no clue which ship is which. The Plutonians arrive at the Jon Don Ronald and the Jon Ron Donald and enter what they believe to be the safe ship, where they find remnants of the explorers hanging from the ceiling. The Mooninites call them via a hologram-wristband and inform that the carnivorous ship has fangs while the other doesn't, and warns them not to wake the carnivorous ship. However, the carnivorous ship is awoken by a living jukebox, therefore trapping Oglethorpe and Emory inside. It's then revealed that Ignignokt and Err don't actually want the ship or the explorers, but only to torment the Plutonians. Oglethorpe and Emory then try to escape through the ship's anus, at which point Oglethorpe's dad calls to tell him to "get is ars home for dinner", in which he explains that the Plutonian race hasn't been conquered or enslaved and that the ship they're in is actually a food truck from Planet of the Apes. As Oglethorpe and Emory are climbing through the anus they become trapped by the other ship, who turns out to be the homosexual lover of the carnivorous ship. Ignignokt calls the Plutonians to inform them that "there is no escape from this anus" and that he and Err are going to go watch Event Horizon.

== Home release ==
The entire tenth season was released in HD and SD on December 8, 2013 on iTunes, the Xbox Live Marketplace, and Amazon Video.

== See also ==
- Alternative titles for Aqua Teen Hunger Force
- List of Aqua Teen Hunger Force episodes
- Aqua Teen Hunger Force

Preceded by Aqua Something You Know Whatever	Aqua Teen Hunger Force seasons	Succeeded by Aqua Teen Hunger Force Forever
