= Aqua Teen Hunger Force season 12 =

Aqua Teen Hunger Force
- Season 12
- Promotional image
- Starring: Dana Snyder; Carey Means; Dave Willis
- No. of episodes: 5

Release
- Original network: Adult Swim
- Original release: November 26 – December 17, 2023

Season chronology
- ← Previous; Season 11

The twelfth and final season of the animated television series Aqua Teen Hunger Force premiered in the United States on Cartoon Network's programming block Adult Swim on November 26, 2023, and concluded on December 17. It was first announced on January 25, 2023, and consists of five episodes, making it the shortest season of the series. It is notably the first time since season seven that the series aired under its original title and not an alternative.

The show is about the surreal misadventures and antics of three anthropomorphic fast food items: Master Shake, Frylock, and Meatwad, who live together as roommates and frequently interact with their human next-door neighbor, Carl.

== Production ==
In April 2015, series co-creator Dave Willis announced that the series would end after its eleventh season, explaining that the decision was made not by either him or Matt Maiellaro but by Adult Swim. Both Willis and Maiellaro first learned about the series' cancellation from the employees of the animation studio halfway during the production. Explaining the decision, Willis said "We were told it's over. If it were our decision, we'd still be making it." Maiellaro expressed confusion over the decision, saying "It's actually quite shocking and a bummer at the same time. [...] The show does well, it generates a lot of revenue, it's not too expensive to make. So for them to let it go is just a bit odd."

In 2017, Adult Swim was asked why they don't make more episodes, to which they responded "we might" with a bump. Willis also expressed interest in doing a Kickstarter to fund Death Fighter, a scrapped sequel to Aqua Teen Hunger Force Colon Movie Film for Theaters.

In May 2021, Adult Swim announced plans to release direct-to-video films based on its series. Among the first three films in the line included films based on The Venture Bros. and Metalocalypse, in addition to a second Aqua Teen Hunger Force feature. The film, Aqua Teen Forever: Plantasm, released in November 2022.

In a December 2022 interview, Maiellaro revealed that he and Willis had begun working on scripts for five new Aqua Teen episodes. In January 2023, in part to the positive reception of the Plantasm film, Adult Swim announced a five-episode order for a twelfth season of the series. In a press release announcing the season, Willis and Maiellaro said while joking about the tone of voice being similar to ChatGPT, "We are thrilled to be making more Aqua Teen Hunger Force episodes for a new generation of fans, building upon the most impressive collection of IP ever assembled. Success is optimal and leads to quality." The decision to order the season came when an executive at Warner Bros. Discovery approached Willis and Maiellaro after discovering leftover funds.

A preview of the season was shown at New York Comic Con 2023, and a trailer released on October 26, 2023. In a May 2024 tweet, Maiellaro indicated that future seasons were unlikely for the time being, describing the show as "cancelled".

=== Animation ===
This season marks a change in the series' animation style. The previous seasons were all animated using Adobe Photoshop, Adobe After Effects, and Apple's Final Cut Pro. Beginning with this season, the series switches to more conventional Flash animation, animated by Floyd Country Productions. The season features a noticeably more detailed art style.

=== Music ===
The season features a remixed version of the original theme song performed by Schoolly D. The remix was used instead of a brand new theme song due to budgetary restrictions, according to an interview with Maiellaro and Willis.

== Voice cast ==
=== Main cast ===
- Dana Snyder as Master Shake
- Carey Means as Frylock
- Dave Willis as Meatwad and Carl

=== Guest appearances ===
- Eric Bauza as Borf, Game Announcer
- Dan Fogler as the Emperear, Christopher, Zenwa Surveyor 7019, Hyper Toaster 8019
- Brian Cox as Anubis
- Gary Anthony Williams as the Situpon
- Maurice LaMarche as the Zenwa Clean Machine 1019, Zenwa Bean Machine 4019
- Danny Trejo as Dewey
- Lance Henriksen as Vanessa
- T. J. Hassan as Wesley Snipes
- Leslie Sharp as the Glorfinoids
- Robert Webb as the Glorfinoids
- Susan Bennett as the GPS
- Brandon Zachary as Glen
- Tim Andrews as the Zenwa Caffeine Machine 2019, Zenwa Groundskeeper, Zenwa Lawn Ranger 9019
- James Austin Johnson as Zenwa Steam Machine 3019
- Peter Mark Kendall as a Situpon agent
- Ronnie Neeley as store clerk
- Jim Fortier as the Leprechaun
- Diallo Riddle as the Illuminati
- Bashir Salahuddin as Terry the Singing Tank Engine

== Episodes ==
| No. overall | No. in season | Title | Directed by | Written by | Original release date | Prod. code | US viewers (millions) |
|---|---|---|---|---|---|---|---|
| 140 | 1 | "Shaketopia" | Dave Willis & Matt Maiellaro | Dave Willis & Matt Maiellaro | November 26, 2023 | 1401 | 0.31 |
Master Shake becomes the ruler of a virtual reality world he dubs Shaketopia, spending an unhealthy and unfathomably long time in the headset. Carl sells a headset to Meatwad, which he uses to see what's going on. The two end up deciding to rule together, to which Frylock finally manages to get them to log off by infecting Shaketopia with a computer virus. Guest appearances: Eric Bauza as Borf and the Game Announcer, Leslie Sharp and Robert Webb as the Glorfinoids, T. J. Hassan as Wesley Snipes
| 141 | 2 | "A Quiet Shake" | Dave Willis & Matt Maiellaro | Dave Willis & Matt Maiellaro | November 26, 2023 | 1402 | 0.28 |
In a parody of A Quiet Place, ear-shaped aliens have invaded Earth causing everyone to go quiet, however, Master Shake is convinced that Frylock is faking it. In retaliation, he, Carl, and Meatwad start a hair metal band, while Frylock uses Carl’s thong to defeat the aliens. Guest appearances: Dan Fogler as the Emperear, Brandon Zachary as Glen, Susan Bennett as the GPS
| 142 | 3 | "Scrip2 2i2le: The Ts Are 2s" | Dave Willis & Matt Maiellaro | Dave Willis & Matt Maiellaro | December 3, 2023 | 1403 | 0.27 |
Master Shake is struggling with writing his screenplay. Things appear to look up when Shake manages to get a robotic coffee maker to help him finish the script, though rather hastily. Through Shake's continued meddling with the coffee maker, several more robotic appliances begin to invade the Aqua Teens' home, all trying to produce movies together. Frylock discovers that each of the appliances is equipped with cameras and microphones and sends them out to be disposed of by sanitation. The sanitation officer, who is a mech that turns into a garbage truck, then sends another robot to make the Aqua Teens participate in a survey, rendering Frylock's attempt at getting rid of them pointless. He finally succeeds by programming their next film with a code that makes the robots turn on each other and collapse their circuitry. Frylock, Meatwad, and Carl all try to get away by moving into a log cabin with no electronic devices, however, it turns out the log cabin is the sanitation officer in another form. Guest appearances: Tim Andrews, Dan Fogler, James Austin Johnson, and Maurice LaMarche as the Zenwa Clean Machine 1019, Zenwa Caffeine Machine 2019, Zenwa Steam Machine 3019, Zenwa Bean Machine 4019, Zenwa Groundskeeper, Christopher, Zenwa Surveyor 7019, Hyper Toaster 8019 and Zenwa Lawn Ranger 9019 respectively.
| 143 | 4 | "Get Lit Upon a Situpon" | Dave Willis & Matt Maiellaro | Dave Willis & Matt Maiellaro | December 10, 2023 | 1404 | 0.20 |
Frylock purchases a Situpon electronic exercise bike, believing that it will help the Aqua Teens get in better shape. However, the bike has a mind of its own and tries everything it can to get Frylock to keep exercising. The bike claims that all Situpons are hoverbikes that aim to bring all users to another planet due to an impending global catastrophe on Earth that can only be shielded via maple syrup. Frylock is convinced for a moment until he begins to realize via Master Shake that it was all a lie. Fed up, Frylock sells the bike to Shake, who ends up not using it. A comet as foretold by the bike hits Earth, revealing that he was indeed telling the truth. Guest appearances: Gary Anthony Williams as the Situpon. Peter Mark Kendall as a Situpon agent. Ronnie Neeley as a store clerk. Jim Fortier as the Leprechaun.
| 144 | 5 | "Anubis" | Dave Willis & Matt Maiellaro | Dave Willis & Matt Maiellaro | December 17, 2023 | 1405 | 0.32 |
Master Shake and Carl go to a friendship seminar, where the host Anubis promises Carl riches and girls while threatening to spill Shake's secret regarding his tendency to wet the recliner if the two of them do not acquire 10 friends. Meatwad is also guilted by Anubis, convinced that he murdered a toy train via Anubis' mind tricks. Both Shake and Carl compete to get new friends with their seminars, however they cannot reach past the main four. Anubis is punished for not bringing 10 friends, and it is revealed that his father is running a pyramid scheme to build a spaceship to Planet Happiness, where Meatwad, Shake, and Carl are now enslaved and forced to partake in its construction. Guest appearances: Brian Cox as Anubis, Lance Henriksen as Vanessa, Diallo Riddle as the Illuminati, Bashir Salahuddin as Terry the Singing Tank Engine, Danny Trejo as Dewey.

| Preceded by Aqua Teen Hunger Force Forever | Aqua Teen Hunger Force seasons | N/A |
