= Aqua Teen Hunger Force season 11 =

Aqua Teen Hunger Force
- Season 11
- The Aqua Teen Hunger Force Forever title card used for the eleventh season
- Starring: Dana Snyder; Carey Means; Dave Willis
- No. of episodes: 9

Release
- Original network: Adult Swim
- Original release: June 21 – August 30, 2015

Season chronology
- ← Previous; Season 10 Next → Season 12

The eleventh season of the animated television series Aqua Teen Hunger Force, alternatively titled Aqua Teen Hunger Force Forever (or shortened as Aqua Teen Forever), aired in the United States on Cartoon Network's late night programming block, Adult Swim, originally set to be the final season. It premiered on June 21, 2015, with "Mouth Quest" and ended with "The Greatest Story Ever Told" on August 30, 2015, with a total of nine episodes. The show is about the surreal adventures and antics of three anthropomorphic fast food items: Master Shake, Frylock, and Meatwad, who live together as roommates and frequently interact with their human next-door neighbor, Carl. In late January 2016, this season became available on Hulu Plus.

Episodes in this season were written and directed by Dave Willis and Matt Maiellaro. The theme music, entitled "We Rule Your Animated Comedy Ass Forever", was written and performed by the three main cast members alongside Michael Kohler. Almost every episode in this season featured a special guest appearance, which continues a practice used in past seasons. This season has been released in various forms of home media, including on demand streaming.

== Production ==
Episodes in this season were written and directed by series creators Dave Willis and Matt Maiellaro, who have both written and directed every episode of the series. Episodes in this season aired in the United States on Cartoon Network's late night programming block Adult Swim.

An episode entitled "Laser Cowboy" was written for this season but was never produced, as Adult Swim did not think it would work. The episode was to be entirely live action, and did not actually feature any of the main characters. The episode was to be as if the main characters were watching a completely different show on Carl's Roku box, with the episode itself being an episode of the show.

Dave Willis first announced that this will be the final season on April 25, 2015, at a C2CE convention panel. He stated that the series was cancelled, and it was not his decision to end it. Willis and Maiellaro first learned about the cancellation from people from the animation studio, halfway through the production of this season. Willis mentioned on Reddit that Adult Swim president Mike Lazzo made the decision to end the series because "he was ready to move on from it".

In 2017, Adult Swim was asked why they did not make more episodes, to which they responded "we might" with a bump. Willis also expressed interest in doing a Kickstarter to fund Death Fighter, a scrapped sequel to Aqua Teen Hunger Force Colon Movie Film for Theaters. The series was announced to have been renewed for a five episode 12th season in 2023.

== Cast ==
=== Main ===
- Dana Snyder as Master Shake
- Carey Means as Frylock
- Dave Willis as Meatwad, Carl, Ignignokt, Handbanana and Boxy Brown

=== Recurring ===
- Matt Maiellaro as Err, Cybernetic Ghost of Christmas Past from the Future and Markula
- George Lowe as Homer Simpson, a mall cop, police man
- MC Chris as young Carl
- Andy Merrill as Oglethorpe
- Mike Schatz as Emory

=== Guest appearances ===
- Justin Roiland as Honest Abe Lincoln's Hot Links mascot (credited as "Rustin Joyland") in "Mouth Quest"
- Andy Daly as Presbobot (credited as "Cactus Tony") in "Mouth Quest"
- Henry Zebrowski‡ as Toby in "Mouth Quest"
- Doug Stanhope as The Hairy Bus in "The Hairy Bus"
- Andy Daly as The Flesh Train (credited as "Cactus Tony") in "The Hairy Bus"
- Kumail Nanjiani as Frylock's bees in "Sweet C"
- Betsy Sodaro as The Queen Bee in "Sweet C"
- Nick Gibbons as "Drunk" in "Sweet C"
- Monica Rial as Jubilee in "Knapsack!"
- Brian Stack as Mappy the Map in "Knapsack!"
- Andrés du Bouchet as GPSy the GPS (credited as "Francisco Gugliani") in "Knapsack!"
- Matt Stanton as Nappy the Knapsack in "Knapsack!"
- Greg Fitzsimmons as Randy in "Rabbit, Not Rabbot"
- Matt Foster as Lionel in "Rabbit, Not Rabbot"
- John DiMaggio as Dr. Zord (credited as "Pat McGroin") in "Rabbit, Not Rabbot"
- Eddie Pepitone as Carl's mother in "Hospice"
- Eugene Mirman as Dr. Mirman in "Hospice"
- Sal Lupo as Dominic in "The Last One Forever and Ever (For Real This Time) (We Fucking Mean It)"
- Dan Triandiflou in "The Last One Forever and Ever (For Real This Time) (We Fucking Mean It)"
- Max Willis as Hankwad in "The Last One Forever and Ever (For Real This Time) (We Fucking Mean It)"
- Sadie Willis as Meatwad's daughter in "The Last One Forever and Ever (For Real This Time) (We Fucking Mean It)"
- Patti Smith as Performing "Aqua Teen Dream" in "The Last One Forever and Ever (For Real This Time) (We Fucking Mean It)"
- Lavell Crawford as Unbelievable Ron in "The Greatest Story Ever Told"

== Episodes ==
| No. overall | No. in season | Title | Directed by | Written by | Original release date | Prod. code | US viewers (millions) |
|---|---|---|---|---|---|---|---|
| 131 | 1 | "Mouth Quest" | Dave Willis, Matt Maiellaro & Craig Hartin | Dave Willis & Matt Maiellaro | June 21, 2015 | 1301 | 0.81 |
In this live-action and stop motion episode, the Aqua Teens are contractually obligated to hawk Honest Abe Lincoln's Hot Links brand beef jerky. When Meatwad's mouth mysteriously disappears, Hot Links mascot Jungle Cat Honest Abe forces the Aqua Teens to locate it. Abe and the Aqua Teens sally forth to Rex, Georgia and do battle with a dangerous Christian robot in order to retrieve the missing mouth from the clutches of a lackadaisical stop motion animator named Toby. Guest appearances: Justin Roiland as Honest Abe Lincoln's Hot Links mascot (credited as "Rustin Joyland"), Andy Daly as Presbobot (credited as "Cactus Tony"), and Henry Zebrowski as Toby
| 132 | 2 | "Brain Fairy" | Dave Willis & Matt Maiellaro | Dave Willis & Matt Maiellaro | June 28, 2015 | 1302 | 0.89 |
Master Shake and Meatwad rudely awaken Frylock with an air horn only to discover that their cohabitant's mental capabilities have been so severely diminished that the formerly sagacious box of fries can no longer prepare breakfast crepes. The Aqua Teens trek to the DMV on suspicions that the covetous fairy employed there has purloined the source of Frylock's intellect. Meanwhile, Meatwad volunteers to be an organ donor in order to receive his driver's license.
| 133 | 3 | "The Hairy Bus" | Dave Willis & Matt Maiellaro | Dave Willis & Matt Maiellaro | July 12, 2015 | 1303 | 0.85 |
Carl and Meatwad's excursion to the cinema takes a detour when they accidentally excise the colon of a hirsute anthropomorphic party bus while burglarizing catalytic converters. Frylock faces a moral dilemma when he must use his online education to save either the wicked Hairy Bus or its twin, the saintly Flesh Train. Guest appearances: Doug Stanhope as The Hairy Bus and Andy Daly as The Flesh Train (credited as "Cactus Tony")
| 134 | 4 | "Sweet C" | Dave Willis & Matt Maiellaro | Dave Willis & Matt Maiellaro | July 19, 2015 | 1304 | 1.10 |
Frylock shrinks Carl down to size in order to infiltrate his beehive and determine why the bees have stopped producing honey. Carl ignores his objective and instead becomes a tyrant who commands the obsequious bees to do his bidding. Guest appearance: Kumail Nanjiani as Frylock's bees, Betsy Sodaro as the Queen bee, and Nick Gibbions as "Drunk"
| 135 | 5 | "Knapsack!" | Dave Willis & Matt Maiellaro | Dave Willis & Matt Maiellaro | July 26, 2015 | 1305 | 1.15 |
At long last Meatwad discovers the wonders of friendship. Unfortunately he falls in with the wrong crowd, a cocaine addicted amateur porn crew and their star actress Jubilee (based on the cast of Dora the Explorer). Frylock races against time to prevent Meatwad from losing his virginity on film while Carl and Master Shake vie to take Meatwad's place in a kinky ménage à trois scene. Guest appearance: Monica Rial as Jubilee "Juby"
| 136 | 6 | "Rabbit, Not Rabbot" | Dave Willis & Matt Maiellaro | Dave Willis & Matt Maiellaro | August 2, 2015 | 1306 | 1.20 |
After being missing for days, Master Shake returns home (for some reason, using a tape recorder that only says "Hi, there's the guy I wanted to see" to speak). Frylock mentions that he and Meatwad last saw Shake at the mall where Meatwad pleaded to get a pet rabbit, Master Shake then reveals he's brought the rabbit home to give to Meatwad (despite that it is unconscious). After Meatwad thanks Shake for the pet rabbit, Master Shake states "Christ has risen once again" in a deep-toned, raspy voice, causing Frylock and Meatwad to realize that he is not the real Master Shake (the latter not caring in the slightest). Meatwad goes next door to show Carl his new rabbit, both of whom suspect that the rabbit is dead, so Carl suggests Meatwad cut off its foot to use for a good luck charm. Meanwhile, Frylock confronts the imposter-Master Shake as to what he did with his "dumbass roommate", to which he explains that he's actually a rabbit named Dr. Zord who drugged Master Shake at the mall so he could swap his mind with Master Shake's. Meatwad and carl discover this when they saw off the rabbit's foot with a circ-saw and realize that the rabbit has Shake's voice (who persistently denies being a rabbit). Dr. Zord brings the Aqua Teens and Carl to the mall that night to demonstrate how he transferred Shake's mind with his: He and Master Shake urinated into the mall fountain at the same time while maintaining eye-contact, which caused lightning to strike the fountain and swap their minds. Frylock, not believing the story in the slightest, agrees to perform this experiment with Dr. Zord's henchman, Randy the Spider, which causes their minds to swap bodies. Astounded by what's happened, Meatwad agrees to perform the experiment with Dr. Zord's other henchman, Lionel the hamster, which results in all the Aqua Teens being mind-swapped with animals. Dr. Zord then exclaims that his plan was to mind-swap his and his henchmen's minds with humans so that they could collect unemployment, which comes undone when Frylock (in spider-form) bites Dr. Zord between the eyes, resulting in him dying due to Master Shake's extreme spider-bite allergy. At this point, Master Shake has alerted mall security of everyone's presence, causing Randy and Lionel to runaway and sending Carl into a panic since he has been arrested for public urination at the mall. Frylock then convinces Carl to perform the experiment with him (saying mall security will never suspect a spider of stealing those denim jackets that he and Randy were raiding), resulting in Carl's mind going into the spider's body and Frylock's mind going into Carl's body. When mall security arrives, they capture the three animals (who are actually Master Shake, Meatwad, and Carl) and ban Frylock/Carl from the mall (although he gets to keep the jackets). Months later on Christmas Eve, Master Shake, Meatwad, and Carl are on sale when they see Frylock/Carl and notice that he is in shape, nicely groomed, and has a smoking-hot girl. When Frylock/Carl sees the three animals, he immediately retreats with his girlfriend (not wanting to give-up the life he has worked hard to get), enraging Master Shake and Carl. Meatwad is then placed in a cage with a Cobra, who eats him. Guest appearances: Greg Fitzsimmons as Randy, John DiMaggio as Dr. Zord (credited as "Pat McGroin"), Matt Foster as Lionel
| 137 | 7 | "Hospice" | Dave Willis & Matt Maiellaro | Dave Willis & Matt Maiellaro | August 16, 2015 | 1307 | 1.14 |
Carl's mother, Dolores, is diagnosed with terminal lung cancer, forcing Carl to convert his home into an ad hoc hospice. Carl copes with his emotional pain by purchasing material goods such as the pro football premium touchdown package on his mother's credit card. To Carl's chagrin, Frylock discovers an unorthodox cure for cancer which saves Dolores' life but transforms her into a South American warrior who has control over rats. Guest appearance: Eddie Pepitone as Carl's mom, MC Chris as young Carl
| 138 | 8 | "The Last One Forever and Ever (For Real This Time) (We ****ing Mean It)" | Dave Willis & Matt Maiellaro | Dave Willis & Matt Maiellaro | August 23, 2015 | 1308 1309 | 1.59 |
Frylock creates a virtual reality game to train for an expedition to an ocean planet inhabited by pernicious francophone bivalves. In a heartbreaking dinner table conversation, Frylock reveals that he is dying and that the ocean planet Chlamydia holds the key to his salvation. When Master Shake discovers his death is also imminent, he composes a bucket list that entails copulating fifty times. Shake receives moral support and Susan B. Anthony dollar coins from Carl, who schemes to misappropriate Frylock's power source for his own financial gain. In the end, the quest to save Frylock and Shake's lives from fizzling out falls on the shoulders of the lowly Meatwad, who matures and learns the true meaning of family. Guest appearance: Patti Smith performing "Aqua Teen Dream"
| 139 | 9 | "The Greatest Story Ever Told" | Dave Willis & Matt Maiellaro | Dave Willis & Matt Maiellaro | August 26, 2015 (online); August 30, 2015 (TV) | 1310 | 1.23 |
Master Shake and Meatwad view last week's grand finale on their television set. Shake seeks eternal life by emulating the life of Jesus Christ while Carl and Frylock gain immortality via a mystical shampoo. Summoned by the smell of the Ceaseless brand shampoo, the ennui-filled Christopher Lambert joins his deathless brethren in repeatedly committing suicide. Ultimately Lambert and the Aqua Teens find out that everlasting life is not all it is cracked up to be. Guest appearance: Lavell Crawford as Unbelievable Ron

== Home release ==
This season is available in HD and SD for digital purchase on iTunes, Google Play, Amazon Video, and Microsoft.

== See also ==
- Alternative titles for Aqua Teen Hunger Force
- List of Aqua Teen Hunger Force episodes

| Preceded by Aqua TV Show Show | Aqua Teen Hunger Force seasons | Followed by Season 12 |
