= The Greatest Story Ever Told (Aqua Teen Hunger Force Forever) =

- Aqua Teen Hunger Force Forever episode
- Master Shake dressed as Jesus in a parody of The Last Supper.
- Episode no.: Season 11; Episode 9
- Directed by: Dave Willis; Matt Maiellaro
- Written by: Dave Willis; Matt Maiellaro
- Production code: 1310
- Original air dates: August 26, 2015 (online); August 30, 2015 (television)
- Running time: 11:26 minutes

Guest appearance
- Lavell Crawford as Unbelievable Ron

Episode chronology
← Previous "The Last One Forever and Ever (For Real This Time) (We ****ing Mean It)"	Next → "Shaketopia"
- Aqua Teen Hunger Force (season 11)

"The Greatest Story Ever Told" is the ninth and final episode of the eleventh season (branded under the alternative title, Aqua Teen Hunger Force Forever) of Aqua Teen Hunger Force, and the 139th episode overall. The episode originally served as the series finale when the series was cancelled in 2015. In the episode, Frylock and Carl become immortal after using special "Ceaseless" shampoo, while Master Shake and Meatwad seek immortality through religion.

Series creators were not made aware of the cancellation of the series until halfway through the final season – regardless, they were still able to make a finale that they felt "does justice" to the show. The episode, both written and directed by series creators, Dave Willis and Matt Maiellaro, preceding this one, "The Last One Forever and Ever (For Real This Time) (We ****ing Mean It)", was falsely promoted as the series finale and aired on August 23, 2015. "The Greatest Story Ever Told" was then quietly released online on August 26, 2015, as a hidden Easter egg on the Adult Swim website. It later made its television debut in the United States on Cartoon Network's late night programming block Adult Swim on August 30, 2015, with very little promotion and was listed as a rerun of "Rabbot" on most television listings. The episode has received positive reception and its television debut was the second highest-rated episode from the season.

== Plot ==
Master Shake and Meatwad are watching a video of Shake photobombing clams from the previous weekend on television. Shake turns off the television and announces that he is, in fact, immortal. He then proceeds to pull out a book called "The Bibble", which he refers to as the Bible. Shake becomes angered when Meatwad corrects him on his error and demands he kneel down and pray to the "Mighty Jimmy", as part of his religion. Frylock enters the room and questions Shake's religion, which promises immortality. Shake states that Frylock isn't eligible for his religion or immortality before leaving the house with Meatwad. Frylock denounces immortality, the scene promptly cutting to him washing his fries in Carl's pool with a bottle of "Ceaseless" shampoo.

While Frylock is in the pool, Carl comes to question him. Carl picks up the shampoo bottle and reads the label explaining that it gives the user immortality. Carl steals the bottle from Frylock and washes his own hair in his house against Frylock's wishes. Soon after, Christopher Lambert abruptly enters Carl's house and explains that Frylock, Carl, and himself are all immortal. To prove this, Lambert allows Carl to decapitate him on video. After Lambert comes back to life, the three of them decide to make a viral internet video of themselves repeatedly committing suicide in various gruesome ways.

Meanwhile, Shake and Meatwad are seen in a church alongside eleven other characters from the series, in an homage to The Last Supper. Shake is dressed up as Jesus Christ and is severing his organs and blood for consumption. Frylock, Carl, and Lambert have entered the church and show their video to Meatwad, explaining to him that it is real. Shake, in a paranoid state, commands everyone in the church to shoot at Frylock, Carl and Lambert. Everyone in the church complies but fail to kill the immortal trio. Two policemen enter the church and shoot several patrons to death, including Shake.

After the shooting, Frylock and Carl take Lambert to see a magic show by Unbelievable Ron to help alleviate his boredom, which he had been expressing throughout the episode. During Ron's performance, he accidentally kills his assistant by cutting her in half. Ron uses his powers to turn witnesses in the audience into birds, including Lambert. During the commotion, the two police officers return and arrest Frylock and Carl for the murder of Lambert. 35 years in the future, Meatwad is visiting Frylock in prison. Frylock explains that Meatwad needs to track down Lambert (in the form of five white birds) to get him and Carl exonerated. Meatwad responds by pulling out a bucket of fried chicken, which annoys Frylock. As the on-screen closing credits start, Frylock explains that Meatwad can use the remaining shampoo to become immortal himself. Meatwad asks if they would be on TV forever, which Frylock confidently answers yes, before the screen abruptly cuts to the Williams Street production card.

The fourth wall is broken in the post-credits scene where the Aqua Teens are seen in their living room with Carl watching the episode itself on television. Shake, Carl, and Frylock each express disappointment in the episode, while Meatwad optimistically suggests doing another joke in the show's final seconds, before the screen abruptly cuts again, this time to a production card for Georgia Entertainment Industries (which was used throughout the eleventh season and seen regularly in other productions made in Georgia), thus ending the series.

== Production ==
"The Greatest Story Ever Told" was written and directed by series creators Dave Willis and Matt Maiellaro who wrote and directed every episode of the series. This is the final episode of Aqua Teen Hunger Force. It features a guest appearance from Lavell Crawford, who reprised his role of Unbelievable Ron, from the season ten episode "Merlo Sauvignon Blanco". This episode also features the song "F-Off", which Maiellaro had originally written and performed for his other Adult Swim series 12 oz. Mouse.

In 2015, the series was cancelled by Adult Swim after 15 years, against the wishes of Willis and Maiellaro, who would have preferred to have the series continue. Willis and Maiellaro were first told about the cancellation by people from the animation studio. By the time they were told about the cancellation they were already done producing about half of the episodes from the final season. Regardless of the timing of the news Willis stated they were still able to produce this finale, that Willis says "does justice to the series" and is "worthy of the show".

In 2017, Adult Swim was asked why don't they make more episodes, to which they responded "we might" with a bump. Willis also expressed interest in doing a Kickstarter to fund Death Fighter, a scrapped sequel to Aqua Teen Hunger Force Colon Movie Film for Theaters.

This is the final project C. Martin Croker worked on for Adult Swim before his death on September 17, 2016. Croker had worked on multiple shows and projects for Cartoon Network and Adult Swim, dating back to the launch of Cartoon Network in the early 1990s.

== Broadcast history ==
The previous episode, "The Last One Forever and Ever (For Real This Time) (We ****ing Mean It)", was falsely promoted as the series finale and originally aired on August 23, 2015, as scheduled. Willis and Maiellaro have referred to "The Last One Forever and Ever (For Real This Time) (We ****ing Mean It)" as the series finale in various press statements and interviews. The episode also features a double-length run-time and a tone common in television series finales.

"The Greatest Story Ever Told" was quietly released as a hidden Easter egg on the Adult Swim website on August 26, 2015, three days after the premiere of "The Last One Forever and Ever (For Real This Time) (We ****ing Mean It)". Adult Swim made the link to the episode on their website as a fake ad for career opportunities, on Facebook as a fake ad for eggs, and on Twitter as an ad for special goggles. The episode was exclusively sponsored by the video game Destiny: The Taken King.

"The Greatest Story Ever Told" first aired on television in the United States on Cartoon Network's late night programming block Adult Swim on August 30, 2015. The television airing had virtually no promotion, with the exception of a trailer for Destiny: The Taken King mentioning an upcoming "secret" episode of Aqua Teen. The original television airing of this episode was falsely listed as a rerun of the pilot episode, "Rabbot", on most television listings. This episode has since been properly listed on television listings in subsequent airings after the night it originally aired.

== Reception ==
In its original American television broadcast on August 30, 2015, "The Greatest Story Ever Told" was watched by 1.237 million viewers and garnered a 0.6 rating in the 18-49 demographic, according to Nielsen ratings. On cable, the episode ranked No. 1 in its time slot. The episode would become the second highest-rated episode of the season, behind the previous episode, "The Last One Forever and Ever (For Real This Time) (We ****ing Mean It)", which was watched by 1.590 million viewers and garnered a 0.8 rating in the 18-49 demographic in its original debut.

Kevin Johnson of The A.V. Club said that the episode was "fairly funny" and was disappointed that Master Shake died in the shootout. He also stated that it would be "pretty great" if the series were to continue as an online series of "random events".

== Home release ==
This episode, along with the rest of the eleventh season, is available in HD and SD for digital purchase on iTunes, Google Play, Amazon Video, and Microsoft.
