= Allen (Aqua Unit Patrol Squad 1) =

- Aqua Unit Patrol Squad 1 episodes
- Master Shake meets Allen, the strict god-like ruler of the world, nine years in the future.
- Episode nos.: Season 8 Episodes 1 & 2
- Directed by: Dave Willis; Matt Maiellaro
- Written by: Dave Willis; Matt Maiellaro
- Production codes: 1001 (Part 1); 1002 (Part 2)
- Original air dates: May 8, 2011 (Part 1); May 15, 2011 (Part 2)
- Running time: 11:19 minutes (Part 1); 11:18 minutes (Part 2)

Guest appearances
- Matt Berry as Allen; Steven Wright as Danny; Michael K. Williams as an unnamed citizen; Donnie Blue as an unnamed citizen

Episode chronology
← Previous "One Hundred"	Next → "Intervention"
- Aqua Teen Hunger Force (season 8)

"Allen" is the two-part season premiere of the eighth season of the American animated television series Aqua Teen Hunger Force (under the alternative title of Aqua Unit Patrol Squad 1), and the 101st and 102nd episodes of the series overall respectively. Both parts of "Allen" originally aired in the United States on May 8, 2011 and May 15, 2011, respectively on Adult Swim. In the first part, Master Shake freezes himself in Dr. Weird's lab and awakes up nine years later disoriented and with no knowledge of the whereabouts of Frylock and Meatwad. In the second part, Shake discovers the world is now controlled by a god-like figure named Allen who kills anyone who misbehaves in order to maintain the world as a Utopia where everyone has respect for one another.

"Allen" is the first episode of the series to be branded under an alternative title, and the first part marks the final appearance of Dr. Weird. The script for the beginning of the first part was read live by the main cast at Dragon*Con in 2010, months before the episode originally aired on television. This is the first two-part episode since "Last Last One Forever and Ever" and "Rabbot Redux"; no other multi-part episodes have premiered since. Both parts later aired together back-to-back in a half-hour block on May 29, 2011. Both parts ranked #1 in their respective time slots on basic cable with all key adult demographics, and the May 29, 2011 airing was seen by 1.675 million viewers. Both parts have been made available on DVD, and other forms of home media, including on demand streaming.

== Plot ==
=== Part 1 ===
The newly formed "Aqua Unit Patrol Squad", a detective squad made up of Master Shake, Meatwad, and Frylock, anthropomorphic fast-food items, are under their latest investigation at an abandoned house to find out if a man is having a sexual affair with the woman they are working for. After Frylock leaves because of a debate over the new show not being any good, Shake and Meatwad fall asleep. Later, when they wake up, a construction worker, whom they believe to be the person having an affair with their client, begins to demolish the house. Shake believes this to be an insurance scam, and that he may be trying to hide "evidence" by tearing the house down. He puts on a beret, a fake mustache, and a poor French accent, and walks over to the construction worker. He tells him that his name is Jacques and that he just moved into the neighborhood, wondering what the man was doing. The construction worker replies that he is tearing the house down. Shake tries to cajole info out of the construction worker about the supposed insurance scam/sexual affair, but he does not budge. Meatwad then tells Shake that they are at the wrong house, and that the man tearing the house down got sent by the city, as it has been vacant for ten years. Shake even admits that the person they are looking for is small and white, while the man in front of them is large and black. After the construction worker orders them to leave, Shake rips off his disguise and accent and orders the construction worker to tell him what kind of back-room operation he had to have to look like that.

Later, at the hospital, Shake is badly injured, to the point where he cannot move, and Meatwad must hand him water. Shake, with his voice very weak, brags about beating the man up. Meatwad then tells Shake that he checked with their client and that she was not even married, ruling out that she had a husband, or that she even had an affair, since she was single. Frylock reveals that the woman really wanted them to find her cat. Shake then comes up with the notion that the man that beat him up took the woman's cat, and framed them by saying that they are detectives. Shake wants her phone records, as well as everyone she has emailed. Frylock then complains that the "new show" still isn't any good, and that they should go back and do what they used to do. Shake then comes up with another plan: hypersleep. They go to Dr. Weird's castle at the South Jersey Shore to "borrow" hypersleep chambers and freeze themselves for nine years. The reason for this is because crime will surely have increased by then, so as a result they will have more business. After they all get into the chambers, Shake freezes himself, and Frylock leaves because he sees it as a terrible, hair-brained scheme. After nine years, Shake awakens, and sees that there was a monster named Danny in the chamber that was making love to his face on and off the entire time so he could deposit his eggs into him. Shake (now sporting a full beard) is disgusted by this, and then jumps at the sight of Danny being electrocuted by lightning. Shake gets a cab ride to an abortion clinic and discovers that "everything is free now" because everyone is supposed to be good. After he gets an abortion, protesters outside are also shot by lightning, as is the doctor that performed the abortion on Shake. Shake then goes back to his home, now in Seattle, and is horrified to discover that no one is there.

=== Part 2 ===
Shake goes over to his neighbor Carl's house (now repainted and with random junk in the yard) to discover that he had moved away, and instead, a man named George Lowe lives there, under the alias "Mister Beefy". George shows him an area to rent that is in a bad section of town. It, however, is free. Kids run away with items in the room and get blasted by the lightning. Shake does not feel like buying it, and then George says that everything is free, vulgarly. Then a blast of lightning kills George. Shake makes a run to a phone booth and leaves many unsuccessful messages on Frylock's answering machine to come and pick him up (Frylock and Meatwad now live in an apartment). Frylock, after having enough of his messages, destroys his answer machine. Shake wanders around for a moment, and is then stopped by some friendly gangsters who ask Shake if he needs directions. Shake is frightened by them and is surprised that they do not want to kill him. One of the gangsters then pulls out a knife and is then electrocuted by the lightning after mentioning Allen and threatening him. Shake questions the other gangster about this Allen, and he tries to walk away from Shake, pretending to not know what he is talking about. Shake is then abducted and thrown into a tiny room with thousands of small monitors inside. The room has a banner outside that reads, "BEHAVE FOR THE ALLEN". It is supposed to say alien, but "Allen" says they, "fucked it up."

Allen says that the monitors track all bad deeds around the entire world, and when spotted the perpetrators are electrocuted, so that the Earth can remain good. Allen then explains to Shake that he is the meanest person on the planet, and that he is going to electrocute him. But Shake responds that he has on a "forcefield"; Allen believes this, and refrains from killing him. Frylock and Meatwad then go right next to the room where Allen and Shake are located and Meatwad tells Frylock a plan he has. Allen tells Shake that he has an abusive father, who forced him to do the job he is doing, after Allen and his friend Tommy have a party and Tommy ruined his father's pool table. Shake then tells Allen that he knows his father, and that his father is going out of town on business. Allen sees this as the perfect opportunity to party with his friend Tommy, and tells Shake to do his job. Meatwad's plan starts, with him saying tiny swears such as "doody" and "butt", while Frylock goes all out and says things like "suck my fry dick". Allen blasts and kills Frylock and gives Shake his powers and goes up out of the room, leaving Shake in charge. But before he can go up to the party room, it catches fire because Tommy was smoking, and Allen argues with his father. Shake then flicks a button which puts a shield on the tower, and Allen's father electrocutes and kills him for "his own good".

== Production ==
Both parts of "Allen" were written and directed by series creators Dave Willis and Matt Maiellaro who have written and directed every episode of the series. The first part originally aired in the United States on Cartoon Network's late night programing block, Adult Swim, on May 8, 2011 with the second part airing a week later on May 15, 2011. Both parts aired together in a half-hour block on May 29, 2011.

The first part features a guest appearance from Steven Wright who voiced Danny. The second part features an appearance from Matt Berry who voiced the lead character and Allen and cameo appearances from Michael K. Williams and Donnie Blue as well. The beginning script for the first part was read live by the main cast: Dana Snyder, Carey Means, and Dave Willis at the Aqua Teen Hunger Force panel at Dragon*Con in 2010, several months before the episode officially aired on television.

This episode is the first episode not to premiere under the Aqua Teen Hunger Force brand as it was the first to air when each season was given an alternative title. The first part features the first and only cold opening since the season two episode, "The Cloning", which features the final appearance of Dr. Weird.

== Reception ==
The original American broadcast of the first part on May 8, 2011 was watched by 1.846 million viewers, and ranked #1 in its time slot on basic cable with all key adult demographics and men 18–34 and 18–24. The original American broadcast of the second part the following week on May 15, 2011 was watched by 1.798 viewers, and ranked #1 in its time slot on basic cable among adults 18–24, alongside the premiere of the Superjail! episode "Jailbot 2.0".

When both parts were re-aired together in a half-hour block on May 29, 2011, it was watched by 1.675 million viewers.

== Home release ==
Both parts of "Allen" were released on DVD in Region 1 as part of the Aqua Unit Patrol Squad 1: Season 1 DVD set on October 11, 2011, along with seven episodes from season seven and the remaining eight episodes from the eighth season. The set was released and distributed by Adult Swim and Warner Home Video, and features "Terror Phone 3" as a special feature, the set also features completely uncensored audio on every episode. The set was later released in Region 4 by Madman Entertainment on November 30, 2011. Both parts of "Allen" are also available in HD and SD on iTunes, the Xbox Live Marketplace, and Amazon Video.
