= Rabbot =

- Aqua Teen Hunger Force episode
- Dr. Weird unveiling the Rabbot.
- Episode no.: Season 1 Episode 1
- Directed by: Dave Willis; Matt Maiellaro
- Written by: Dave Willis; Matt Maiellaro
- Production code: 101
- Original air dates: December 30, 2000; Original Cut (Cartoon Network); September 16, 2001; Final Cut (Adult Swim)

Episode chronology
| ← Previous — | Next → "Escape from Leprechaupolis" |
- Aqua Teen Hunger Force (season 1)

"Rabbot" is the series premiere of the American animated television series Aqua Teen Hunger Force. A rough-cut version of this episode originally aired in the United States prior to the launch of Adult Swim on December 30, 2000 on Cartoon Network unannounced, the final cut of this episode later aired on Adult Swim on September 16, 2001. In the episode Master Shake, Frylock, and Meatwad investigate the recent destruction of Carl's car, while a giant mechanical rabbit destroys downtown.

The December 30, 2000 airing of "Rabbot" received a 0.2 household rating. The Rabbot character would later return in future episodes. This episode has been made available on DVD, and other forms of home media, including on demand streaming.

== Plot ==
Dr. Weird unveils his newest invention, a titanic robotic rabbit named The Rabbot, to solve the world's "vegetable nightmare". Dr Weird then sprays the Rabbot in the face with French perfume, which causes the Rabbot to go berserk, break out of Dr. Weird's laboratory, and flatten Carl's car. The next morning, Carl notices his flattened car; Master Shake comes out to solve the mystery of what happened to Carl's car, but after briefly examining the crime scene, Master Shake concludes that "Meteors did it" and charges Carl $20. Frylock then comes out to teleport Carl to work. Carl reasserts that he works out of home, so Frylock's teleportation beam simply flings Carl onto the roof of his house. Master Shake and Frylock then proceed to solve the rest of this mystery from inside Carl's pool against his demands. There, Shake says that the culprit "is someone who is jealous of Carl's ability to drive" and goes to wake Meatwad. Upon awakening, Meatwad begins to dance to his jam box, but then Shake stomps on it, saying that "Dancing is forbidden".

Once again, Master Shake, Frylock, and Meatwad loiter in Carl's pool, where Shake loses all his enthusiasm he had for the mission and wishes to close it, but Frylock insists that they continue. Meatwad is then hitched to the Aqua Teens' mode of transportation, the "Danger Cart". After a mishap with the garage door, which Frylock resolves by blowing it up, the Aqua Teens head for the mall. However, the Rabbot has already rampaged the mall, spraying various objects with a strange hair growing formula. The Aqua Teens make it to the mall, where Frylock discovers a mountain of evidence from Rabbot's rampage. He continues to investigate, but Shake, growingly increasingly bored, calls off the investigation and declares the case solved.

As the Aqua Teens return home, they head through downtown and notice that the Rabbot is rampaging through the city and is spraying buildings with his hair growing formula. The Rabbot sprays Shake with the spray, causing him to grow long hair and to abandon the mission to get a perm. Meatwad then stops Rabbot by playing his jam box, which causes Rabbot to dance along to the music. However, upon Shake's return, he orders Frylock to blast the Rabbot with his eye lasers, but they reflect off his body and burn Shake's hair off. Angered, Shake declares he will destroy the Rabbot, but only produces a blob of milkshake that plops out of him harmlessly. The Aqua Teens then flee as the Rabbot starts to chase them. The Aqua Teens regroup in Carl's pool, where Shake says that the Rabbot (who is still dancing to the music from Meatwad's jam box) has made downtown unsafe and that they must find some new restaurants and nightclubs. Carl then demands they get out of his pool. The episode ends with the Rabbot dancing downtown, while the closing credits are shown on a split screen.

== Production ==
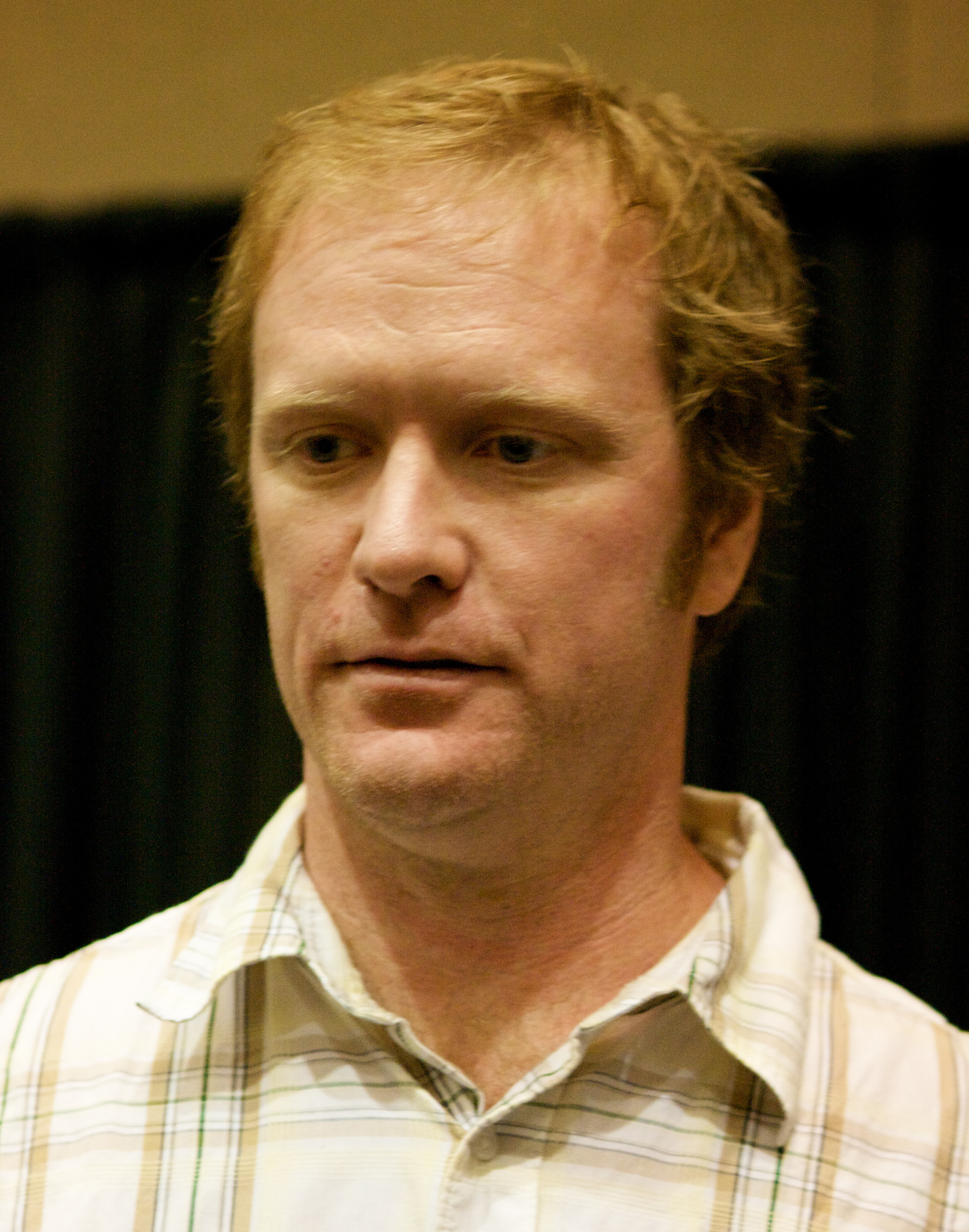
Dave Willis co-wrote "Rabbot" along with Matt Maiellaro.

"Rabbot" is the pilot as well as the first episode of Aqua Teen Hunger Force. It was written and directed by series creators Dave Willis and Matt Maiellaro, who have since written and directed every episode of the series. Several backgrounds were borrowed from other Cartoon Network properties like Johnny Quest and SWAT Kats: The Radical Squadron for use in "Rabbot". The "Powerpuff Mall" featured in this episode was taken from the pilot episode of The Powerpuff Girls, "Meat Fuzzy Lumkins", the same mall appears in later episodes. Additional backgrounds made original for the series were done by Jon Schnepp and Bob Pettitt.

"Rabbot" is one of the few episodes to feature the main protagonists as detectives, a premise was added to appease Cartoon Network executives, who did not initially understand the series' concept at first. By the fourth episode, "Mayhem of the Mooninites", this premise and the use of the name by the characters were dropped. The use of this premise was satirized and mocked in some later episodes.

The 2010 episode from season seven "Rabbot Redux" is named after this episode. This episode features multiple clips, references and lines taken directly from "Rabbot". The Rabbot also makes a third appearance in this episode, where he crushes Frylock, Master Shake, and Meatwad's newly purchased house.

=== Original pitch pilot ===
A rough cut version of "Rabbot" with a 15-minute run time was made as an original pitch pilot to the network. The original pilot was produced over the course of a year, just as an episode of Space Ghost Coast to Coast. In this version characters are seen in low resolution and are featured several times with transparent eyes and mouths as a result of fast keying to get the characters behind the background, as the production crew was focusing more on story telling than appearances. It features backgrounds and settings that differ greatly from the series, including a scrapped laboratory that was to be in the protagonist's house, seen right off the living room. Frylock is depicted as a wizard-like sorcerer who performs spells, and Master Shake constantly refers to things as being "forbidden" and calls the team to assemble, both of these concepts were soon dropped. The opening scene featuring Dr. Weird and Steve was not animated for the most part, it is instead presented as a series of inanimate sketches from a story board, featuring an additional team of scientists who never appear in the series or the final cut of this episode. The sketches of Dr. Weird and Steve used are significantly different from the final versions of the characters. Willis stated that the sketches almost got the project killed mainly as a result of the animation transfer.

== Broadcast history ==
An unfinished version of "Rabbot" originally aired on December 30, 2000 on Cartoon Network, several months before the official launch of Adult Swim. It aired alongside the unfinished pilot episode of Harvey Birdman, Attorney at Law and two different episodes of Sealab 2021. Nine days earlier on December 21, 2000 the unfinished pilot episode for The Brak Show and the first episode of Sealab 2021 had also aired in the same fashion. These programs were listed as "Special Programming" on official listings.

The version that aired on December 30, 2000 featured scenes from the original pitch pilot that were eventually cut from the final version of the episode. There was no theme song or opening titles, the segues that cut to another scene were also different – instead of Schooly D narrating over rap music, they showed the old "outer space zoom" segue from the Hanna-Barbera Super Friends cartoon, with the instrumental of the Aqua Teen Hunger Force theme played over it. In the cold open, after the Rabbot escapes, Dr. Weird says "Unleash the mechanical frog!" and the giant garage door opens again, showing a huge mechanical frog. There was also a scene of Master Shake sitting in the hair salon talking about things he hates. After Meatwad says "everyone likes dancing" it cuts to Shake getting his hair done and saying "..And I HATE dancing. It's one of my LEAST favorite things to do. Other things I hate are work, exercise, people, stupid people—". This version of the episode has never been re-aired or digitally released, but a recording of it can be found online.

"Rabbot" was never aired again until the final cut made its official television debut on September 16, 2001 on Adult Swim in the United States, only two weeks after Adult Swim launched on September 2, 2001. The series had already made its official television debut a week earlier on Adult Swim with the second episode "Escape from Leprechaupolis" on September 9, 2001.

== Home media ==
"Rabbot" was released on DVD as part of the Aqua Teen Hunger Force Volume One DVD set on November 18, 2003 in Region 1, along with fifteen other episodes from the first season. The set was released and distributed by Adult Swim and Warner Home Video, and features the original pitch pilot version of "Rabbot" along with optional audio commentary on the original pitch pilot version by Willis, Maiellaro, and Jay Wade Edwards. The set was later released in Region 2 on April 27, 2009 and in Region 4 by Madman Entertainment on November 7, 2007.

"Rabbot" is also available on iTunes, the Xbox Live Marketplace, and Amazon Video.
