= Mike Schatz =

American actor

Mike Schatz is an American creative director, copywriter, actor, and comedian. He is best known as the voice of Emory the Plutonian on the Adult Swim series Aqua Teen Hunger Force and the film; Aqua Teen Hunger Force Colon Movie Film for Theaters. In addition, he worked on creative direction for the Atlanta Braves, the Up TV station, and other clients from the Blue Sky Agency, an advertising agency based in Atlanta, Georgia.

Schatz is a cast member at Dad's Garage Theatre Company, where he wrote the shows V.I.P. Room, Apnea, and King of Pops: The Post Apocalyptic Musical.

== Acting ==
Year	Production	Role	Other notes
1998	Major League: Back to the Minors	Renegades Batter	Feature film
2002–2015	Aqua Teen Hunger Force	Emory, File Folder, Germ	18 episodes
2004	Spacecataz	Emory	Failed pilot
2007	Frisky Dingo	Torpedo Vegas	2 episodes
2007	Aqua Teen Hunger Force Colon Movie Film for Theaters	Emory	Feature film
2007	Aqua Teen Hunger Force Zombie Ninja Pro-Am	Emory	Video game
2007, 2009	Squidbillies	Console, Scientist	2 episodes
2011	Your Pretty Face is Going to Hell	Actor	Pilot
2011	Archer	Remy	1 episode
2014	Alone with People	Dave	TV special
2022	Aquadonk Side Pieces	Emory	1 episode

== See also ==
- Andy Merrill
- List of Aqua Teen Hunger Force characters
