= Aqua Teen Hunger Force =

American adult animated television series

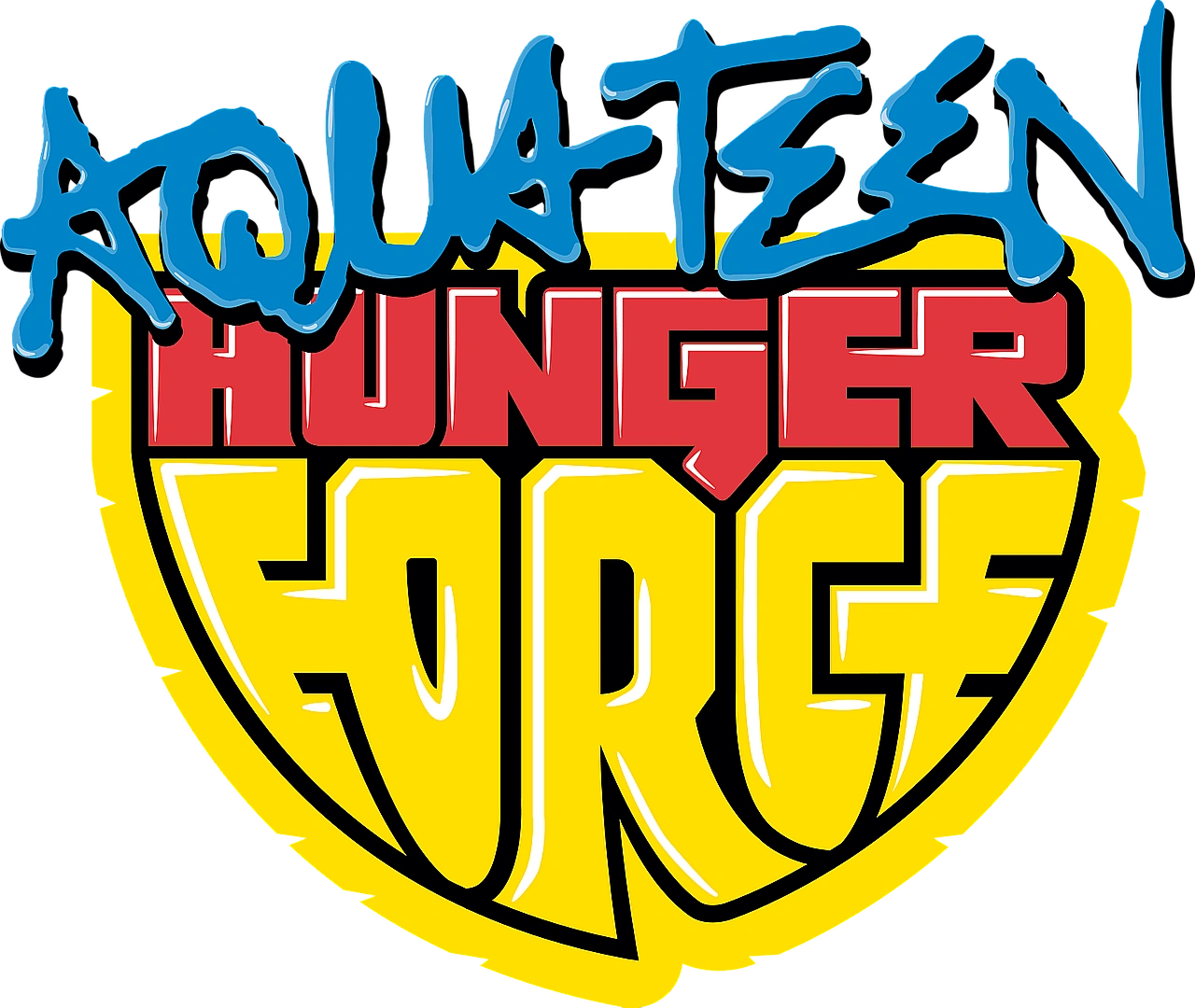
- Also known as: Aqua Unit Patrol Squad 1 (season 8); Aqua Something You Know Whatever (season 9); Aqua TV Show Show (season 10); Aqua Teen Hunger Force Forever (season 11)
- Genre: Adult animation; Surreal humor; Black comedy; Animated sitcom
- Created by: Dave Willis; Matt Maiellaro
- Written by: Dave Willis; Matt Maiellaro
- Directed by: Dave Willis; Matt Maiellaro
- Voices of: Dana Snyder; Carey Means; Dave Willis; Matt Maiellaro; George Lowe (2002–2015); C. Martin Croker (2000–2015); Andy Merrill; Mike Schatz
- Narrated by: Schoolly D
- Music by: Schoolly D
- Opening theme: "Aqua Teen Rap" by Schoolly D (2000–10); "Aqua Unit Patrol Squad" by Joshua Homme & Alain Johannes (2011); "Aqua Something You-Know-Whatever" by Mariachi El Bronx & Schoolly D (2012); "Aqua TV Show Show" by Flying Lotus ft. Thundercat (2013); "We Rule Your Animated Comedy Ass Forever" by Dave Willis, Dana Snyder, & Carey Means (2015); "Aqua Teen Hunger Force Theme (2023 Remix)" by Schoolly D (2023)
- Country of origin: United States
- Original language: English
- No. of seasons: 12
- No. of episodes: 144 (1 unaired) (list of episodes)

Production
- Executive producers: Keith Crofford (Note: Seasons 1–11); Mike Lazzo (Note: Seasons 1–11); Dave Willis (Note: Season 12); Matt Maiellaro (Note: Season 12); Kelly Crews (Note: Season 12); Cameron Tang (Note: Season 12)
- Producers: Dave Willis (Note: Seasons 1–11); Matt Maiellaro (Note: Seasons 1–11); Jay Wade Edwards; Ned Hastings
- Running time: 11–12 minutes; 22 minutes (Note: Episodes 58 and 138)
- Production company: Williams Street

Original release
- Network: Cartoon Network
- Release: December 30, 2000
- Network: Adult Swim
- Release: September 9, 2001 – August 30, 2015
- Release: November 26 – December 17, 2023

Related
- Space Ghost Coast to Coast; Carl's Stone Cold Lock of the Century of the Week; Spacecataz; Soul Quest Overdrive; Aquadonk Side Pieces

Aqua Teen Hunger Force (also branded with different alternative titles for seasons 8–11) is an American adult animated television series created by Dave Willis and Matt Maiellaro for Cartoon Network's late night programming block Adult Swim. Produced by Williams Street, the series follows the surreal adventures of three anthropomorphic fast food items: Master Shake, Meatwad, and Frylock, who live together as roommates and clash with their human next-door neighbor, Carl. The series is known for its crude digital cutout animation style and absurdist humor, which helped define the tone of Adult Swim's early programming.

The first episode premiered on Cartoon Network on December 30, 2000, and the series later made its official debut on Adult Swim on September 9, 2001. Every episode was directed and written by Willis and Maiellaro, who also provided several voices. Seasons 8–11 were each given a different title, accompanied by different theme music, as a running joke. The series initially concluded on August 30, 2015, but later returned for an additional season on November 26, 2023. The series ultimately ended on December 17, 2023, with a total of 144 episodes over the course of 12 seasons, making it the longest running series on Cartoon Network.

Aqua Teen Hunger Force Colon Movie Film for Theaters, a film adaptation of the series, was released in theaters on April 13, 2007, the first adaptation of an Adult Swim series into a feature-length film. A spin-off series consisting of 10 online shorts, titled Aquadonk Side Pieces, were released on the official Adult Swim YouTube channel in April 2022 and a direct-to-video film, titled Aqua Teen Forever: Plantasm, was released on November 8, 2022.

== Premise ==
From left to right: Master Shake, Meatwad and Frylock.

The series centers on the surreal adventures and antics of three anthropomorphic fast food items: Master Shake, a selfish, pathologically lying milkshake; Frylock, a calm and intelligent box of French fries; and Meatwad, a shapeshifting, childlike ball of ground meat. They live together and frequently conflict with their human neighbor Carl, a middle-aged, boorish, lecherous sports fanatic. The protagonists also encounter new antagonists in most episodes. Some episodes feature cameos from celebrities appearing as fictionalized versions of themselves.

The Mooninites are two aliens from the Moon who frequently appear, serving as primary antagonists and wreaking havoc through a series of illegal or destructive actions. The Mooninites appear more than most characters outside the main cast. Other recurring characters have made several appearances, including Oglethorpe and Emory, MC Pee Pants, Cybernetic Ghost of Christmas Past from the Future, and Markula. Episodes often end with the non-canonical deaths or injuries of major characters, or destruction to their property, only to be restored without explanation in the following episode.

In the show's first seven seasons, the protagonists live in a suburban neighborhood in South New Jersey. During the eighth season, the location was changed to Seattle, Washington. The Seattle setting appears entirely identical to the Jersey setting. As of the ninth season, the same neighborhood is identified as "Seattle, New Jersey".

=== Cold openings ===
During the first two seasons, episodes cold-opened with a glimpse into the laboratory of Dr. Weird. He and his assistant Steve use the first several seconds of the show to create monsters, disasters, and various things. In earlier episodes of the first season, the monsters or creations usually form the basis of the plot, but as the crime-fighting element of the program disappeared, the Dr. Weird segment became a non sequitur opening gag.

In the third season, the Dr. Weird openings were replaced with segments from the pilot episode of Spacecataz, an unaired spin-off created by Willis and Maiellaro. Six episodes were planned for production, but Adult Swim felt there was little that could be made into five more episodes since all the characters were destroyed at the end of the pilot, despite the parent series having little to no canon. These segments featured the Mooninites and Plutonians trading insults, gestures, and practical jokes. The full Spacecataz pilot is available as a special feature on the Volume Four DVD box set.

Cold openings were eliminated starting with the fourth season premiere, "Dirtfoot". A one-off cold opening featuring Dr. Weird and Steve was used once again in the season eight premiere "Allen Part One".

== Production ==
=== Development ===
The prototype designs of Meatwad, Master Shake and Frylock.

The three main characters—Master Shake, Frylock, and Meatwad—were originally created for an episode of Space Ghost Coast to Coast called "Baffler Meal", where they were the corporate mascots for the fictional fast-food chain "Burger Trench". The original versions of the trio were prototypes that resembled the future characters, but both Master Shake and Frylock differed in appearance, personality, and voice from their ultimate design. The original name "Teen Hunger Force" refers to the squad's mission to conquer hunger in teens.

"Baffler Meal" went through a number of drafts but was not animated or produced until after the series became popular. Instead, the Space Ghost episode was initially rewritten as "Kentucky Nightmare", while the trio, along with Carl, debuted in "Rabbot", the pilot episode of Aqua Teen Hunger Force. A full season consisting of 16 episodes, including "Rabbot", was put into production shortly thereafter. The series was one of Adult Swim's most popular shows.

In early episodes, the trio was identified by Master Shake as the Aqua Teen Hunger Force, which solved crimes for money. After a few episodes, this premise and the characters' use of the name were dropped. The premise was a trick that had been added to appease Cartoon Network executives, who "didn't want to air a show about food just going around and doing random things". In the show, Frylock says they stopped fighting crime because "that wasn't making us a whole lot of money".

=== Animation ===
For its first eleven seasons, Aqua Teen Hunger Force was animated with an off-the-shelf, low-budget software pipeline. Character designs and background elements were scanned into Photoshop, composited and animated in After Effects, and assembled using Final Cut Pro. The process relied heavily on reusing static digital graphics and limited cutout movements rather than full keyframe animation.

For the twelfth season in 2023, production transitioned away from the original in-house software pipeline to Floyd County Productions., which utilized conventional digital 2D vector animation.

=== Writing and direction ===
Every episode of Aqua Teen Hunger Force was written and directed by series creators Dave Willis and Matt Maiellaro and produced by Williams Street. Much of the dialogue was supplemented with ad-libs and improvisation by the voice talent. The show was fully scripted but ad-libs are included in the final recordings and the shows are animated to include this improvisation. Many of the crew and cast members formerly worked on Space Ghost Coast to Coast.

=== Voice actors ===
The main cast of the series consists of Dana Snyder as Master Shake, Carey Means as Frylock, and series co-creator Dave Willis as both Meatwad and Carl, as well as Ignignokt. In addition to the main cast series co-creator Matt Maiellaro voices Err, Cybernetic Ghost of Christmas Past from the Future, Satan and Markula. Members of the main cast and Maiellaro also voice several minor and one-time characters in addition to their primary roles. All three main characters appear in almost every episode. They are all absent from the season five episode "Sirens" and the season ten episode "Spacecadeuce". In the season five episode "Robots Everywhere", Frylock and Master Shake only make brief unseen speaking cameos, while Meatwad is completely absent.

Voiceover artist George Lowe has made several appearances throughout the series. Lowe previously starred as Space Ghost in Space Ghost Coast to Coast and the original incarnation of Cartoon Planet, from which several cast and crew members moved on to work for Aqua Teen Hunger Force. Lowe made his first appearance in Aqua Teen Hunger Force in the season one episode "Mail Order Bride" and went on to make several other cameos. He had a prominent appearance as himself in the season four episode "Antenna", and reprised his role as Space Ghost for a quick appearance in Aqua Teen Hunger Force Colon Movie Film for Theaters. Lowe was later considered a member of the main cast in 2011 during Aqua Unit Patrol Squad 1; he announced the title of each episode and continued to make cameos. Lowe later made another prominent appearance in the Aqua Something You Know Whatever episode "Rocket Horse and Jet Chicken".

Series animator C. Martin Croker, known for his interpretation of Zorak in various shows and specials, provided the voices of both Dr. Weird and Steve during the cold openings for the first two seasons and "Allen Part One". Croker also voiced several birds in the season seven episode "Eggball". Andy Merrill has portrayed Oglethorpe alongside Mike Schatz as Emory in several episodes. Merrill is also well known for his interpretation of Brak in several shows and specials and provided the voice of Merle in "Escape from Leprechaupolis" and "The Last One". MC Chris, who has a history of voicing characters on Adult Swim programs, has provided the voice of MC Pee Pants in several episodes. Chris also provided the voice of eight-year-old Carl in "Cybernetic Ghost of Christmas Past from the Future" and returned for a musical role in the season seven episode "One Hundred" after a long absence. Tommy Blacha joined the recurring cast with the introduction of his character Wongburger in the season four episode "Dickesode". With the exception of Tommy Blacha, the entire recurring cast reprised their roles in Aqua Teen Hunger Force Colon Movie Film for Theaters.

Various comedians, athletes, and other celebrities have made guest appearances, usually credited under pseudonyms due to the series originally using non-union voice talent.

The twelfth season featured Eric Bauza, Brian Cox, Maurice LaMarche, Dan Fogler and Gary Anthony Williams. Unlike the first eleven seasons, the twelfth season is unionized under SAG-AFTRA.

Main Cast members
Dana Snyder	Carey Means	Dave Willis	Matt Maiellaro	George Lowe	C. Martin Croker
Master Shake	Frylock	Meatwad, Carl, Ignignokt, Video Game Voice, Boxy Brown, Various	Err, Cybernetic Ghost of Christmas Past from the Future, Satan, Markula, Various	Himself, Police Officer, Season eight episode announcer, Jet Chicken, Various (2002-2015)	Dr. Weird, Steve, Various (2000-2015)

=== Alternative titles ===
Alternative titles
Alternative title	Season	Original season run
Aqua Unit Patrol Squad 1	8	May 8 – July 24, 2011
Aqua Something You Know Whatever	9	June 24 – August 26, 2012
Aqua TV Show Show	10	August 11 – October 20, 2013
Aqua Teen Hunger Force Forever	11	June 21 – August 30, 2015

In 2011, for the eighth season, the series' title was changed to Aqua Unit Patrol Squad 1; Maiellaro later explained that he and Willis were getting bored with the former title and wanted to "come up with a new fresh open and a whole new show, just to try it out". Despite the title change there were virtually no changes to the show's characters or tone. In 2012 Maiellaro announced that each subsequent season would have a different series title, making it a running gag. Willis later said the alternate titles were just an unsuccessful stunt to generate buzz.

Each season that is branded under an alternate title features a different opening sequence and theme music written by different artists. On most television listings and digital download sites, the alternatively titled episodes are formally listed under their alternative titles, not as episodes of Aqua Teen Hunger Force. On most legal digital downloading sites that feature the series, the first 7 seasons are presented as Aqua Teen Hunger Force while the alternatively titled seasons are listed separately and treated as if they were each a completely different, one-season series.

=== Theme music ===
Rapper Schoolly D performed the Aqua Teen Hunger Force theme song used in the first seven seasons. An extended remix version of the theme was used in the 2007 film adaptation and in the soundtrack for the 2011 video game Saints Row: The Third. After a multi-year absence, Schoolly D returned for the season seven episode "Rabbot Redux", performing a different theme song used exclusively in that episode. The special intro to "Rabbot Redux" featured the exact animation used in the regular intro. Each subsequent season featured a different theme song by a different artist with a different animated intro. The eighth season was written and performed by Joshua Homme and Alain Johannes. Schoolly D returned for the season nine intro for Aqua Something You Know Whatever, writing and performing it with Mariachi El Bronx. The season 10 theme song was produced by Flying Lotus, an artist with a long history of being featured in Adult Swim's bumps. Every episode features an opening sequence, with the rare exceptions of the season two episode "The Last One", the season nine episode "The Granite Family", and the season ten episode "Spacecadeuce".

=== 2015 cancellation ===
In 2015, it was announced that Adult Swim had cancelled Aqua Teen Hunger Force. The cancellation went against the wishes of Willis and Maiellaro, who first learned about it from the animation studio, Awesome Inc., halfway through the production of the 11th season. Willis said that Adult Swim president Mike Lazzo made the decision to end the series because "he was ready to move on from it". The double-length episode "The Last One Forever and Ever (For Real This Time) (We F##king Mean It)" was falsely promoted as the series finale and aired on August 23, 2015. The actual series finale, "The Greatest Story Ever Told", was quietly released early online on August 26 before airing four days later, with virtually no advertisement. At the time of its conclusion, Aqua Teen Hunger Force was Adult Swim's longest-running original series.

=== Revival ===
During an interview about the series' cancellation, Maiellaro said there are no plans to revive Aqua Teen Hunger Force, but that it could return someday. In 2017, Adult Swim was asked why they don't make more episodes, to which they responded "we might" via a bump.

In April 2022, Adult Swim began uploading Aqua Teen Hunger Force shorts under the name Aquadonk Side Pieces to their YouTube channel. These shorts are often less than four minutes and center around the villains in the show, with all original voice actors reprising their roles. In December 2022, Maiellaro announced in an interview that he and Dave Willis were working on five new Aqua Teen scripts. A month later, Adult Swim officially announced the five episodes as the show's twelfth season.

In a May 2024 tweet, Matt Maiellaro indicated that future seasons were unlikely for the time being, describing the show as "cancelled."

== Episodes ==
Series overview
Season	Episodes		Originally released			Alternate title
Season	Episodes		First released	Last released	Network	Alternate title
1	18	1	December 30, 2000		Cartoon Network	
1	18	17	September 9, 2001	December 29, 2002	Adult Swim	N/A
2	24		May 25, 2003	December 31, 2003	Adult Swim	N/A
3	13		April 25, 2004	October 24, 2004	Adult Swim	N/A
4	13		December 4, 2005	December 22, 2006	Adult Swim	N/A
5	10		January 20, 2008	March 23, 2008	Adult Swim	N/A
6	10		March 29, 2009	May 31, 2009	Adult Swim	N/A
7	12		December 13, 2009	May 2, 2010	Adult Swim	N/A
8	10		May 8, 2011	July 24, 2011	Adult Swim	Aqua Unit Patrol Squad 1
9	10		June 24, 2012	August 26, 2012	Adult Swim	Aqua Something You Know Whatever
10	10		August 11, 2013	October 20, 2013	Adult Swim	Aqua TV Show Show
11	9		June 21, 2015	August 30, 2015	Adult Swim	Aqua Teen Hunger Force Forever
12	5		November 26, 2023	December 17, 2023	Adult Swim	N/A
Shorts	10		April 18, 2022	April 28, 2022	YouTube	Aquadonk Side Pieces
Films	2		April 13, 2007	November 8, 2022	Adult Swim (TV airings)	N/A

== Films ==
=== Aqua Teen Hunger Force Colon Movie Film for Theaters (2007) ===
A feature film based on the show, Aqua Teen Hunger Force: Movie Film for Theaters, was released on April 13, 2007. The movie follows the origins of the Aqua Teens, which includes an exercise machine, Neil Peart of the band Rush, a watermelon slice named Walter Melon, and an appearance by a heavy metal band Mastodon in the opening sequence. The film also introduces a fourth Aqua Teen, a chicken nugget named Chicken Bittle (voiced by Bruce Campbell). The Plutonians and the Cybernetic Ghost of Christmas Past from the Future, recurring characters, both make appearances in the movie, as well as the Mooninites, Dr. Weird and MC Pee Pants (this being his last appearance in the series).

=== Aqua Teen Forever: Plantasm (2022) ===
In a 2010 interview, staff members of Radical Axis stated that a sequel titled Death Fighter was in production, and mentioned the possibility that the film might be made in 3-D. When asked if the film was designed for a theatrical release, a Radical Axis staff member responded affirmatively, but stated: "We're not sure if we have a distributor yet", though this was then followed by the statement that "Adult Swim will never make another movie ever again".

By 2014, the script for Death Fighter had been completed and approved; however, Willis indirectly stated that the project was scrapped, soon after announcing the show's cancellation. He later mentioned on Reddit that it would cost $3.4 million to produce, and expressed interest in doing a Kickstarter to fund it. A new film was confirmed to be in production in May 2021, no other details have been confirmed other than it will be a direct-to-video film.

On May 12, 2021, Adult Swim confirmed the production of three new original films, including a new Aqua Teen Hunger Force film to make exclusive debuts on HBO Max following a physical/VOD release.

On November 14, 2021, it was announced the film would be released in 2022.

On May 18, 2022, it was revealed the film would be titled Aqua Teen Hunger Force: Plantasm. It was changed to Aqua Teen Forever: Plantasm. The film was released on Blu-ray, 4K Ultra HD and digital on November 8, 2022.

== Broadcast ==
The pilot episode "Rabbot" originally aired on Cartoon Network on December 30, 2000, as part of a special preview of upcoming Adult Swim shows. Other shows in the preview block included Sealab 2021, The Brak Show, and Harvey Birdman, Attorney at Law. Aqua Teen Hunger Force later made its official debut on September 9, 2001, on Adult Swim, where the series has since aired exclusively, in the United States. The final episode "The Greatest Story Ever Told" made its television debut on August 30, 2015, after having been quietly released online four days earlier.

A spin-off web series featuring Carl Brutananadilewski, Carl's Stone Cold Lock of the Century, was released from 2007 to 2016 on Adult Swim's website, where Carl commentates on upcoming football games.

=== International broadcast ===
In Canada, Aqua Teen Hunger Force previously aired on Teletoon's Teletoon at Night block and later G4's Adult Digital Distraction block. The series currently airs on the Canadian version of Adult Swim.

In Australia, it began airing on SBS2 starting April 2013, but ceased airing, and returned in July 2016 as part of a version of Adult Swim on 9Go!, with the series airing from the beginning.

== Merchandise ==
Several pieces of merchandise have been made for the series, including T-shirts, caps, wristbands, patches, and buttons featuring characters in the series. Master Shake and Carl Halloween costumes for adults were also available. There was also a series of collectible action figures and plush toys available along with car decals. Several pieces of custom merchandise were available on the Adult Swim Shop before the site quietly shut down in March 2012. Aqua Teen Hunger Force Colon Movie Film for Theaters Colon the Soundtrack, the soundtrack to the film, was released in stores on April 10, 2007. On November 3, 2009, a Christmas album titled Have Yourself a Meaty Little Christmas sung by characters from the show was released in stores.

In September 2010, Adult Swim Shop introduced a full scale, functioning hot air balloon in the likeness of Meatwad at a cost of $70,000. The purchase includes a piloted, one-hour ride anywhere in the continental United States, and the buyer got to keep it although a pilot's license would be required to actually fly it. The balloon was the most expensive item on Adult Swim Shop, surpassing the Metalocalypse "Dethklok Fountain" fountain, which was released early in 2010 for $40,000. The hot air balloon is no longer available.

=== Home releases ===
The series airs in broadcast syndication outside the United States and has been released on various DVD sets and other forms of home media, including video on demand streaming.

The first eight seasons have been released and distributed on DVD in volumes by Warner Home Video. Each set was also released in Region 2 and by Madman Entertainment in Region 4. The movie was released on a DVD set titled Aqua Teen Hunger Force Colon Movie Film for Theaters for DVD, with the season four episode "Deleted Scenes" included as a special feature on August 17, 2007. The season five episode "Robots Everywhere" was also released as a special feature on the Aqua Teen Hunger Force Zombie Ninja Pro-Am video game on November 5, 2007, months prior to its official television debut on January 20, 2008. The first eleven seasons with the exception of the episodes "Boston" and "Shake Like Me" and the film Aqua Teen Hunger Force Colon Movie Film for Theaters were released in a 20-disc DVD collection on September 20, 2022, as Aqua Teen Hunger Force: The Baffler Meal Complete Collection. It was the first time that seasons 9-11 have been released on DVD. The episode "Shake Like Me" is not included on the DVD due to its use of blackface, similar to its removal from rerun rotations and HBO Max. A second movie, Aqua Teen Forever: Plantasm, was released on Blu-ray and 4K on November 20, 2022.

With the exception of the season four episode "Deleted Scenes", episodes of Aqua Teen Hunger Force are also available on iTunes, the Xbox Live Marketplace, and Amazon Video, with seasons five and up available in HD on iTunes and the Xbox Live Marketplace, and with seasons six up on Amazon Video. The movie is also available in HD and SD on the Xbox Live Marketplace. The season five episode "Boston" has never been released in any form of home media.

The series has been made available for on-demand streaming on Hulu Plus, as part of a deal made with Hulu and Turner Broadcasting. Every episode from all seasons is available for streaming at Hulu. As of May 27, 2020, the series is also available on HBO Max, with the exception of the episodes "Boston" and "Shake Like Me".

Aqua Teen Hunger Force home video releases
Season			Episodes	Release date
Season			Episodes	Region 1
1		2000–02	18	November 18, 2003
1		2000–02	18	July 20, 2004
2		2003	24	July 20, 2004
2		2003	24	November 16, 2004
3		2004	13	December 6, 2005
4		2005–06	13	January 29, 2008
5		2008	10	December 16, 2008 (excluded "Boston")
6		2009	10	December 16, 2008 (excluded "Boston")
6		2009	10	June 1, 2010
7		2009–10	12	June 1, 2010
7		2009–10	12	October 11, 2011
8	Aqua Unit Patrol Squad 1	2011	10	October 11, 2011
9	Aqua Something You Know Whatever	2012	10	September 20, 2022
10	Aqua TV Show Show	2013	10	September 20, 2022
11	Aqua Teen Hunger Force Forever	2015	9	September 20, 2022

=== Video games ===
There have also been video games created based on the series. Aqua Teen Hunger Force: Destruct-O-Thon, a mobile game based on the series, was published and released by Macrospace games in 2004. In 2005 Oberon Games released Aqua Teen Hunger Force: Studio Shakedown for PC. Aqua Teen Hunger Force Zombie Ninja Pro-Am, a golfing/kart racing/fighting game, was developed by Creat Studios and published by Midway Games, and released for the PlayStation 2 on November 5, 2007. An online Flash game based on the series titled The Worst Game Ever was released, but was eventually taken down. A game titled Carl's Freaking Strip Poker was also available on Adult Swim Games, but was eventually taken down.

== Reception, influence, and legacy ==
In January 2009, IGN listed the series as the 39th-best show in the Top 100 Best Animated TV Shows. The series was nominated for Teen Choice Awards in 2007 and 2008. In 2011 Willis and Maiellaro received Annie Award nominations for writing in the season eight episode, "The Creditor". In 2019, IGN placed Aqua Teen Hunger Force 25th on their list of Top 25 Animated series for adults.

James Rolfe, best known for creating the Angry Video Game Nerd, has cited the show as an influence on Nerd as well as shaping his sense of humor. YouTuber Jason Gastrow, better known as Videogamedunkey, has also cited the show as a comedic influence.

=== 2007 Boston bomb scare ===
The series received national attention in 2007 because of a publicity stunt that became known as the Boston bomb scare. On January 31, 2007, as part of a national guerrilla marketing campaign for the series, Peter Berdovsky and Sean Stevens installed Lite-Brite-like LED displays depicting the Mooninites in eleven cities: Boston, New York, Los Angeles, Chicago, Atlanta, Seattle, Portland, Denver, Austin, San Francisco, and Philadelphia. In Boston, the authorities considered the LEDs suspicious, prompting the closure of major roads and waterways for investigation. Turner Broadcasting System later admitted to placing the LEDs and apologized for the misunderstanding.

Berdovsky and Stevens faced charges for "placing a hoax device and disorderly conduct"; in spite of the uproar, the two mocked the media and critics in interviews. All criminal charges were dropped in exchange for Berdovsky and Stevens apologizing during their court date and accepting a plea bargain that consisted of community service at the Spaulding Rehabilitation Center. Turner Broadcasting paid the Boston Police Department $1 million to cover the investigation's cost and an additional $1 million for good will. This was designed to settle criminal and civil claims, while the general manager of Cartoon Network stepped down because of the incident. Of the eleven cities in which the displays were placed, only Boston saw them as a matter of concern. The installations had been up for weeks before the panic.

An Aqua Teen Hunger Force episode from season five, "Boston", was produced as the series creators' response to the bomb scare, but Adult Swim pulled it to avoid further controversy. The episode has never aired or been formally released to the public legally in any format, though an unfinished version of it was illegally leaked online in January 2015.
