= List of Aqua Teen Hunger Force characters =

This is a list of characters featured in the Adult Swim animated television series Aqua Teen Hunger Force.

== Main characters ==
From the left: Carl, Master Shake, Meatwad and Frylock

=== Master Shake ===
Voiced by Dana Snyder, Master Shake (or simply Shake) is a mean-spirited, narcissistic, obnoxious, lazy, shallow, selfish, manipulative and idiotic milkshake. When the Aqua Teens solve crimes, Master Shake claims to be the leader, despite rarely accomplishing anything and usually obstructing progress and leaving the actual work to Frylock. His special powers are emitting charged blobs of pistachio milkshake from his straw and making any small object he throws to the ground explode, though the latter is not noticed by himself or other characters. Shake particularly loathes Meatwad and goes out of his way to torment and bamboozle him with elaborate schemes. Master Shake also frequently tries to con other characters, notably Carl, though it always fails thanks to his selfishness, greed, gullibility or any of his other glaring character flaws. He engages in various get-rich-quick schemes that are poorly thought out and usually illegal in nature. Even when Master Shake's plans do work out, he usually miscalculates and does not earn profits but incurs incredible losses. Carl is often his business partner in these ridiculous schemes. Shake is also extremely lazy and balks at the idea of completing chores, let alone getting a job; the few times he has held a job ended with Shake abandoning his post and, on one occasion, trying to embezzle the register on his way out. Shake is extremely vain and self-absorbed and frequently acts out to get attention, or even brags about skills and accomplishments he obviously lacks. According to one critic he is "voiced, as always, with wonderful snarkiness by Dana Snyder."

=== Frylock ===
Voiced by Carey Means, Franklin French Frylock (known simply as Frylock) is a floating box of French fries who has laser-shooting contact lenses, dental braces and a goatee. He is easily the series' smartest and most mature character and often saves Shake and Meatwad from danger. His special powers are levitation and various eye beams, both powered by a large jewel on his back. He occasionally tries to be environmentally friendly, to the ire of Master Shake. Frylock often serves as the straight man to the antics of the other characters in the series and takes on a parental role towards Meatwad, but despite being the most level-headed and responsible of the three, he also is known to act perverted towards women not normally considered to be socially desirable and occasionally engages in illegal and amoral sciences, sometimes at the behest of anonymous benefactors or black market buyers.

=== Meatwad ===
Voiced by Dave Willis, Meatwad is a large and ball-like clump of ground beef (stated by Shake to be hamburger meat in "Dickesode"). Meatwad has a single tooth and – due to moving around by rolling on the ground – he tends to have stray hairs embedded in his "body". He is very childlike, sweet-natured, and naive, which leaves him easily bamboozled. Frylock tries to be a good guardian to Meatwad, but Shake often tortures and pranks Meatwad. However, in some episodes Meatwad manages to manipulate and dominate Shake. Other antagonists, such as the Mooninites, also manipulate Meatwad into going along with their illegal or dangerous activities. Meatwad can shapeshift (usually into a hot dog or an igloo) and is very resilient, quickly reforming after being harmed.

=== Carl ===
Also voiced by Dave Willis, Carl Brutanunanulewski or Brutananadilewski (Note: "Brutanunanulewski" appears in the season 8 show intro, while "Brutananadilewski" appears on Carl's driver's licence in the season 3 episode "Remooned".) is the short-tempered, vulgar, sarcastic, obese and unlucky human neighbor of the often destructive Aqua Teens. Carl loves pornography, prostitutes and strippers, sports (especially the New York Giants), his Dodge Stealth "2 Wycked", classic rock and junk food. He hates it when the Aqua Teens are in his pool or when they (especially Shake) mess with his car. He is also shown to particularly detest Shake (whom he calls "Cup") though he is occasionally cordial to Frylock and Meatwad (whom he refers as "Fryman" and "Meatman", respectively). Carl prides himself on being more normal than his neighbors; however, he is shown to engage in or have connections with various illegal activities and criminal associates and has bizarre sexual fetishes. Carl is mostly unfazed by the various odd happenings around him, and is often maimed or killed. Carl also appeared on his own sports-related online series entitled Carl's Stone Cold Lock of the Century of the Week, as well as Pregame Prognostifications from the Pigskin Wyzzard. Carl generally has a contentious and negative relationship with the Aqua Teens; he nevertheless ends up (willingly or not) associating with them and their antics.

== Recurring characters ==
=== Dr. Weird ===
Voiced by C. Martin Croker, Dr. Weird is a mad scientist who lives in an abandoned mental asylum on the perpetually rainy Jersey Shore that shows up at the cold openings of the first three seasons. Weird did not appear in the series again until the eighth season, but some episodes have a picture of him and Frylock in the latter's room. The film explains that it was Weird who created the Aqua Teens for the purpose of watching them crash into a brick wall, but this idea never became a reality. But in the end's twist, Weird was revealed to have been created by Frylock. He is loosely based on Dr. Strangemoon, a one-off villain from Josie and the Pussycats, who lives in South Florida.

=== Steve ===
Steve, also voiced by C. Martin Croker, is Dr. Weird's assistant. Red-haired, wearing a lab coat and science goggles, he is normally pictured holding and staring at a test tube. Steve often becomes the victim of mishaps with Weird's experiments, many resulting in his death or some kind of negative reaction.

=== George Lowe ===
George Lowe (the voice actor for Space Ghost on Space Ghost Coast to Coast) periodically appears in Aqua Teen Hunger Force as a fictionalized version of himself. George made his first appearance in "Mail Order Bride" as a wedding DJ. He often appears as a policeman, although he has also appeared as an actor, attorney, and repairman, among other roles.

From the left: Cybernetic Ghost, Oglethorpe, Emory, Ignignokt (bottom), and Err

=== The Mooninites ===
Ignignokt, who is voiced by Dave Willis, and Err, who is voiced by Matt Maiellaro, are two-dimensional 8-bit aliens from the Moon; belonging to a race known as the Mooninites. Ignignokt is the calmer, condescending, green leader and Err is the smaller, quick-tempered, pink sidekick. The two are extremely arrogant, and often claim to be superior to anyone who lives on Earth, despite never giving a reason for their alleged superiority and in reality are quite the opposite. When pressed by Frylock, they claimed they are superior because they can "jump really high" due to the lower gravity of the Moon compared to the Earth, something they promptly failed at doing. A running gag of how whenever the duo use their weaponry, the projectiles they fire will move at a ridiculously slow speed, but whenever it does hit a target it sends the target to the Moon.

=== The Plutonians ===
Oglethorpe, who is voiced by Andy Merrill, and Emory, who is voiced by Mike Schatz, are two spiked aliens from Pluto. Oglethorpe is the fat, orange, dumber leader with a German accent (who resembles a slice of cheese) and Emory is the green, smarter one with a headband (who resembles a shred of lettuce); however, their Master Shake "clone", Major Shake, states the obvious fact that "they're [both] really stupid." Oglethorpe appeared in the 2018 Dr. Demento album Dr. Demento Covered in Punk.

=== MC Pee Pants ===
Voiced by MC Chris, MC Pee Pants is a criminally insane rapper who wears a shower cap and a diaper. He takes different forms (a giant spider, a cow, a decrepit old man, among others) in each appearance and is usually killed and sent to Hell over and over again and is occasionally sent back to the mortal world by Satan in continuously pathetic forms. His rap albums contain (not so) subliminal messages in order to get his fans (just Meatwad, and Carl on one occasion) to assist in his outlandish world domination schemes. MC Pee Pants appeared in the 2018 Dr. Demento album Dr. Demento Covered in Punk.

=== Cybernetic Ghost of Christmas Past from the Future ===
Voiced by Matt Maiellaro, the Cybernetic Ghost of Christmas Past from the Future is a crazy robot that starts long, nonsensical stories with "thousands of years ago...", with fog always appearing out of nowhere in whichever location when he begins to tell his stories. In the spinoff Aquadonk Side Pieces it is revealed he is an actual ghost in a suit of robot armor.

=== Dr. Wongburger ===
Voiced by Tommy Blacha, Dr. Wongburger is an insane alien scientist. He appears in the episodes "Dickesode", "Creature from Plaque Lagoon", and "Hands on a Hamburger". His running storyline is that the various establishments he runs are actually fronts for his plan to build a spaceship so that he may return to his home planet. He takes on various forms in all of his appearances, from a phallic shape, a giant tooth, and a giant hamburger.

=== Boxy Brown ===
Voiced by Dave Willis in the series, and Killer Mike in Aqua Teen Forever: Plantasm, Boxy Brown is a friend of Meatwad's, but can talk in an African-American voice. He is a cardboard box with an afro and face. Unlike the other talking characters, his mouth does not move while he talks and only those to whom he talks can hear him.

=== Markula ===
Voiced by Matt Maiellaro, Markula is a vampire and the Landlord of the Aqua Teens and Carl. He appears in the episodes "Robots Everywhere", "Sirens", "Couple Skates", "Vampirus", and "The Greatest Story Ever Told". He also appears in the direct-to-video movie Aqua Teen Forever: Plantasm. In the first couple of episodes of season five, Markula had demons kidnap the Aqua Teens, because he refused to fix a gas leak, so they refused to pay for October's rent. In those episodes Carl received new neighbors that irritated him and, in the same breath, overjoyed Markula. Markula also has the power to mutate living things by biting them. Markula was eventually killed by Carl with a bottle of garlic champagne in the episode "Couples Skate" exclaiming "Open wide, jackass!". He was 4,040 years old. In the very next episode (Reedickyoulus), Frylock said "Finally, I keep telling and telling our landlord" even though Markula was dead at the time. Somehow Markula survived, because he shows up in a season 8 episode in which he and a bunch of bats have a virus that affects Carl, but not Shake.

== Other characters ==
From the left: Oog, the brownie monsters (back), Romulox, Randy, Happy Time Harry; (front) Bingo, the frat aliens, the "Dumbassahedratron" (front), Major Shake, Ol' Drippy, The Cybernetic Ghost of Christmas Past (From the Future), Mothmonsterman, and Rabbot (last two on far right, as portrayed in the episode "The Last One")

- Allen (Matt Berry) – A small purple alien who takes over the world and kills anyone who he finds to be acting immoral. Master Shake lies to and manipulates him to get him killed, saving the world.
- Bert Banana (David Cross), Tammy Tangerine (Kristen Schaal) and Mortimer Mango (H. Jon Benjamin) – A group of born again Christian fruit who Frylock meets on Myspace. They try to convert the Aqua Teens to Christianity but eventually fall off the wagon themselves and start drinking again. They made cameos in "A PE Christmas". An Aqua Teen Hunger Force spin-off series entitled Soul Quest Overdrive features characters inspired by them.
- Dumbassahedratron (Jon Schnepp) – Is a levitating cubical entity obsessed with telling jokes and sharing his bumper sticker insight. He claims to be the Wisdom Cube, but, however, the Wisdom Cube is in fact his cousin. In "The Last One", he ends up in hell after dying of suffocation.
- Dan (Ned Hastings) – a rain gutter salesman who "won't leave 'til he makes a sale" and strongly resembles the Grim Reaper. Dan sold gutters to the Aqua Teens and killed Carl. Dan's only appearance occurs in "Grim Reaper Gutters".
- Merle (Andy Merrill), Flargon and Dingle (both Scott Hilley) – Three leprechauns who trick people by sending spam emails to go to a park and stay in the rainbow, but in reality, they steal their valuables. They use a rainbow projecting machine which they stole from Dr. Weird. The leader is dim-witted, while his partner is slightly more intelligent. The gender of the extra one is unknown and all he says are "Feet" and "No Feet". They were killed trying to reach the Moon in "The Last One" in an accident that also destroys the trees.
- Drewbacca (Scott Adsit) – A wookiee who pretended to be a werewolf. He offered to cut the Aqua Teens' lawn if they helped him blow up the moon, but he ended up annoying Frylock very much. At one point in the episode, Drewbacca turned into a werewolf (though this is later revealed to just be his Wookiee hair growing back), and killed Carl. He is later revealed to be a shaved Wookiee (and a fan of Star Trek) who plays in a Star Trek tribute band (which was revealed by Frylock). Drewbacca's only appearance on the show was "2-And-A-Half Star Wars Out of Five".
- D.P. and Skeeter (aka Frat Aliens) (Patton Oswalt) – Two fish-like aliens who have blue-green skin and often seem intoxicated. D.P. keeps mentioning that his father owns an automobile dealership. In the episode "Frat Aliens", where they are first introduced, D.P. admits he does not know his given name. He has claimed that D.P. stands for "Donkey Puncher". They also appeared in the episode "The Last One", where they are both killed and devoured by a female alien; however, they are featured in the 2007 video game Aqua Teen Hunger Force Zombie Ninja Pro-Am.
- Dusty Gazongas (Scott Thompson) – a mindless sexy stripper/electrician that Shake and Carl become obsessed over and fight over.
- Svetlana (Rita McGrath) - A mail order bride.
- Freda (Casey Wilson) - A female robot created by Frylock.
- Freedom Cobra (Gregory Alan Williams) – A living tattoo of a cobra, Shake got to pick up chicks. It was the tattoo artist's cheapest tattoo and had to be "installed" during a lightning storm. It gives its wearer an appetite for human flesh. At first, Shake managed to convince him to start off with Meatwad's dog Bobby (which was originally Shake's dog before it started attacking him in response to his abuse), but later ends up eating Carl, after Freedom Cobra suggested they eat Meatwad (whom Shake did not want to eat out of fear of getting into trouble). Shake later told Frylock and Meatwad the truth after Frylock discovered Carl's hand. They took Shake to the doctor to get the tattoo surgically removed, but Freedom Cobra forced the doctor to cut off his hands so he and Shake could eat them. He also had the doctor give Shake plastic surgery apparently so no one can tell Shake's sad, after he is done eating them. It appears in the episode "Freedom Cobra".
- Gorgatron – A giant Mooninite who Ignignokt and Err use as a villain in their video game to seek the "moon master" for protection from him. Only seen in "Moon Master".
- Handbanana (Dave Willis) – A yellow "dog" Frylock made for Meatwad using a software called Make Your Own Dog 1.0, however, during the creation process in Carl's pool, Shake contaminates the process, and the "dog" is just a larger version of Shake's hand. Although nice and friendly to everyone else he "mindlinks" with Carl and rapes him repeatedly throughout the episode. Handbanana was made from radioactive waste and Shake's hand and has a close resemblance to a banana, hence how he got his name. He has a non-speaking cameo in "One Hundred". He also appears in the Aqua Unit Patrol Squad-1 intro, as a leather jacket wearing thug fighting with Frylock.
- Happy Time Harry (David Cross) – A mean, cynical, and depressed doll Frylock bought for Meatwad due to his low price of $3.99. His bad attitude affects all the Aqua Teens, especially Meatwad, who after trying to play with him, adopts his cynical demeanor. Happy Time Harry suffers from alcoholism, cirrhosis, and a pill addiction. He is also suicidal and engages in self-harming behavior. When threatened by Master Shake and Frylock, he begs them to put him out of his misery. He has a receding hairline and wears only a pair of boxers and little red dancing shoes. He has a retractable knife in place of his missing hand, which he claims his father gave him. He was thrown of a cliff by Master Shake at the end of "Dumber Dolls" but was later killed by Frylock in "The Last One".
- Hoppy Bunny (Scott Adsit) – A furry whose fursona is a pink bunny with a crown on it. When Carl's new recorder started taking control of him, Hoppy Bunny ordered Carl to put on an elfish garb and play the recorder for the amusement of him and his fellow furries. In his day job, he is a surgeon.
- Inflatable Hitler (Bill Hader) – Adolf Hitler in the form of a balloon, the result of an attempt to smuggle his Nazi memorabilia in a balloon placed in his rectum, the balloon's pop killing him and fusing his soul into it. Frylock worked for him for a brief time, somewhat unaware of his identity, until he found out that Hitler planned to get rid of Jews with an army of Aryan balloons (armed with the biological weapon Frylock designed to target Jews that he was having Frylock develop). Frylock and Master Shake try to pass off balloons filled with Shake's farts as the bio-weapon Frylock developed, but Hitler discovers their deception (having converted Meatwad to the Jewish faith in order to test the weapon out on him) and unleashes his balloon army on them; however, Frylock defeats them easily by popping them with the sharp end of his fry. Hitler then tells his origin story before the Aqua Teens manage to convince him to stop hating the Jews when he found out Adam Sandler (along several celebrities he liked) is a Jew, causing him to accept the Jews, even hugging Jewish Meatwad. However, he is popped and killed by Frylock when he redirects his hatred from the Jews to gay people. His only appearance on the show was in "Der Inflatable Fuhrer".
- Insane-O-Flex – A transforming exercise machine created by Walter Melon. In the feature film, Carl sits in it when it is still in the form of a normal exercise machine. After Carl sits down, the machine transforms into a monster that straps Carl to it, and forces him to do an innumerable amount of reps, leaving Carl with a gigantic, chiseled body. The Insane-o-flex creates havoc throughout the whole town. However, its one weakness is horrible music through which it cannot "feel" rhythm. Master Shake destroys the Insane-o-flex by playing a horribly mediocre song called "Nude Love" from his new album. The Insane-o-flex is probably a girl, because it lays eggs. First appeared in the movie.
- Javier – Dr. Weird's Spanish speaking janitor. In Revenge of the Trees when Steve was mocking Dr. Weird, Javier tried to warn Steve of Dr. Weird's giant head popping out before Steve had his head bitten off. In Kidney Car, Javier discovers Dr. Weird's medallion and upon picking it up, Dr. Weird shoots him with exploding tacos.
- Love Mummy (Tom Clark) – A mummy who demands expensive goods and threatens the Aqua Teens with a curse if they fail to comply. Eventually, Frylock discovers that the "curse" is simply a tactic to manipulate the Aqua Teens to do his bidding, and simply throws him out with the garbage. The Love Mummy also appears as a "piece of junk" in later episodes. His crown hat turns the lower half of anyone who wears it into a snake tail, as it did to Carl.
- Major Shake (Matt Harrigan) – a poorly made clone of Master Shake, created by Oglethorpe and Emory, and has a boombox sticking in his side. Was sent to Earth to "deterraform" the Earth and is shown to be smarter than his creators. Frylock easily saw through his disguise, knowing he did not share the same personality as Shake.
- Mothmonsterman (H. Jon Benjamin) – A creation of Dr. Weird. He is infatuated with Master Shake's signal, and stalked the Aqua Teens with the hope that Master Shake would switch the signal back on. He looks like a giant humanoid moth. He wears brown pants and black shoes. He also appeared in "The Last One".
- Ol' Drippy (Todd Field) – a living, breathing clutter of mold reincarnated from a pile of trash Shake left sitting molding on the floor. He befriends Meatwad and has a habit of cleaning and redecorating. He claims to be half-penicillin.
- One Hundred (Robert Smigel) – Only appeared in the 100th-episode special, "One Hundred", is a giant, mutant yellow monster in the shape of the number 100, that destroyed the Aqua Teens house and thus following them into the old Scooby-Doo cartoon parody threatening to rape Shake's girlfriend.
- Oog (Jon Glaser) – A caveman, who stumbled upon one of Frylock's inventions that vanished in time, that kept him alive and made him a bit more intelligent.
- The POD (Bill Hader) – A live pod. He kept trying to replicate Shake, but Frylock stopped him every time. He is a big fan of Chickenfoot. In the end the POD replicated Carl and Chickenfoot. His only appearance on the show was "IAMAPOD".
- RABBOT – a giant robotic rabbit created by Dr. Weird who wreaks havoc upon the city, sprays an alarming amount of hairspray, totals Carl's car, and constantly names the days of the week.
- Randy the Astonishing (Dave Willis) – A yellow tentacled creature that is the prince of Jupiter. Shake sold Meatwad to Randy's circus which becomes a flop when Shake does his act. He later shows up in "The Last One" getting controlled by Travis of the Cosmos, and getting a wig from Bingo that turns him into a frozen clown.
- Romulox (Todd Barry) – A hipster that Shake accused of stealing his PDA, which actually belonged to Romulox. He is a humanoid monster made of tar that wears a bra and bikini, he appears in the episodes "PDA" and "The Last One".
- Rubberman (Don Kennedy) – (character design by Catherine Kaehne—also known as Lance Potter or Lance: the Duck made from Used Condoms) Appearing in the episode "Rubberman," Frylock created him out of the used condoms and needles left outside Carl's house by crackwhores, and intended to use him as a duck-shaped mascot to promote safe sex. Instead, Meatwad uses Carl's lamp to bring him to life á la Frosty the Snowman, at which point they go on a crime spree. Eventually he was killed by Frylock with a flamethrower.
- Rudy – A giant baby who is worshiped as a god by the Flightless Birds of Death Island. He is encountered by the Aqua Teens (in episode 90: Eggball) when they embark on an expedition to acquire more metallic eggs to use as balls for Master Shake's custom built pinball machine. He later goes on a rampage and destroys his entire island, causing the Flightless Birds to speculate that he may be developmentally disabled.
- The Trees – Talking trees that tried to prove that Shake and Carl were guilty for dumping waste into the forest. The Tree Judge is voiced by Dave Willis, while the Stenographer is voiced by Matt Maiellaro and the others are voiced by Jim Fortier, Ned Hastings, Nick Ingkatanuwat, and Vishal Roney, while their Court-Appointed Shrub Lawyer assigned to the Aqua Teens is voiced by Jay Edwards. They were set on fire in "The Last One".
- Turkatron (Matt Maiellaro) – A robotic turkey who was under the impression that he was actually the Cybernetic Ghost of Christmas Past From the Future, but he is actually a malfunctioning toy, and there are hundreds of him. He also likes to start stories with "In the year of 9595....".
- Walter Melon (Chris Kattan) – A talking watermelon slice who is the father of the Aqua Teens. He wanted to use their saved income to build an exercise gym. He knew his plan would fail when he found out that they all live in the same house, which they rent. He is the creator of the Insane-o-flex and he produced three best-selling exercise videos which caused him to lose his job. First appeared in the movie. Not to be confused with the titular main character from the short-lived animated series of the same name that ran on the ABC Family Channel (now Freeform).
- Wayne "The Brain" McClain (Seth MacFarlane) – A super-smart alien that wears grass on his head to cover his huge brain. He appears in a single episode where he competes with the Aqua Teens in a game of bar trivia. After winning a couple of times, he reveals that everything was an illusion he created with his mind in order to be cool.
- Willie Nelson (Tom Scharpling) – A monster resembling an onion with spider legs who lives in the Aqua Teens attic. At first Shake thought he was not scary so he tried to teach Willie to be scarier, until he learned that Willie kills people. He first appeared in "The Shaving". He also appears in "One Hundred" and in Aqua Teen Hunger Force Colon Movie Film for Theaters when the roof is torn off by the Insane-O-Flex. Willie was named after the real-life country musician.
- The Voice (Isaac Hayes III) – A deep, menacing disembodied voice that tries to make people eat the "Broodwich", an evil sandwich that is made of only the most evil ingredients. The Voice threatens anyone of their doom should they finish eating the Broodwich. Later appeared in "The Last One".
- Zakk Wylde (Himself) – a legendary rocker whom Shake owes money to after they recorded a flop of a song. Rides on a chariot carried by unicorns and wields an axe-shaped guitar.
- Dr. Zord (John DiMaggio) – An evil rabbit that switched bodies with Master Shake after they both stared into each other's eyes while peeing in a wishing well. Dr. Zord was originally a rabbit Meatwad wanted, but Frylock would not let him have so it was given to him by Master Shake. Dr. Zord then knocked out Master Shake and switched bodies with him, but later died of a spider bite while still in Shake's body.

== See also ==
- List of Aqua Teen Hunger Force episodes
