= Jed Davis (musician) =

American musician, songwriter, record producer and graphic designer

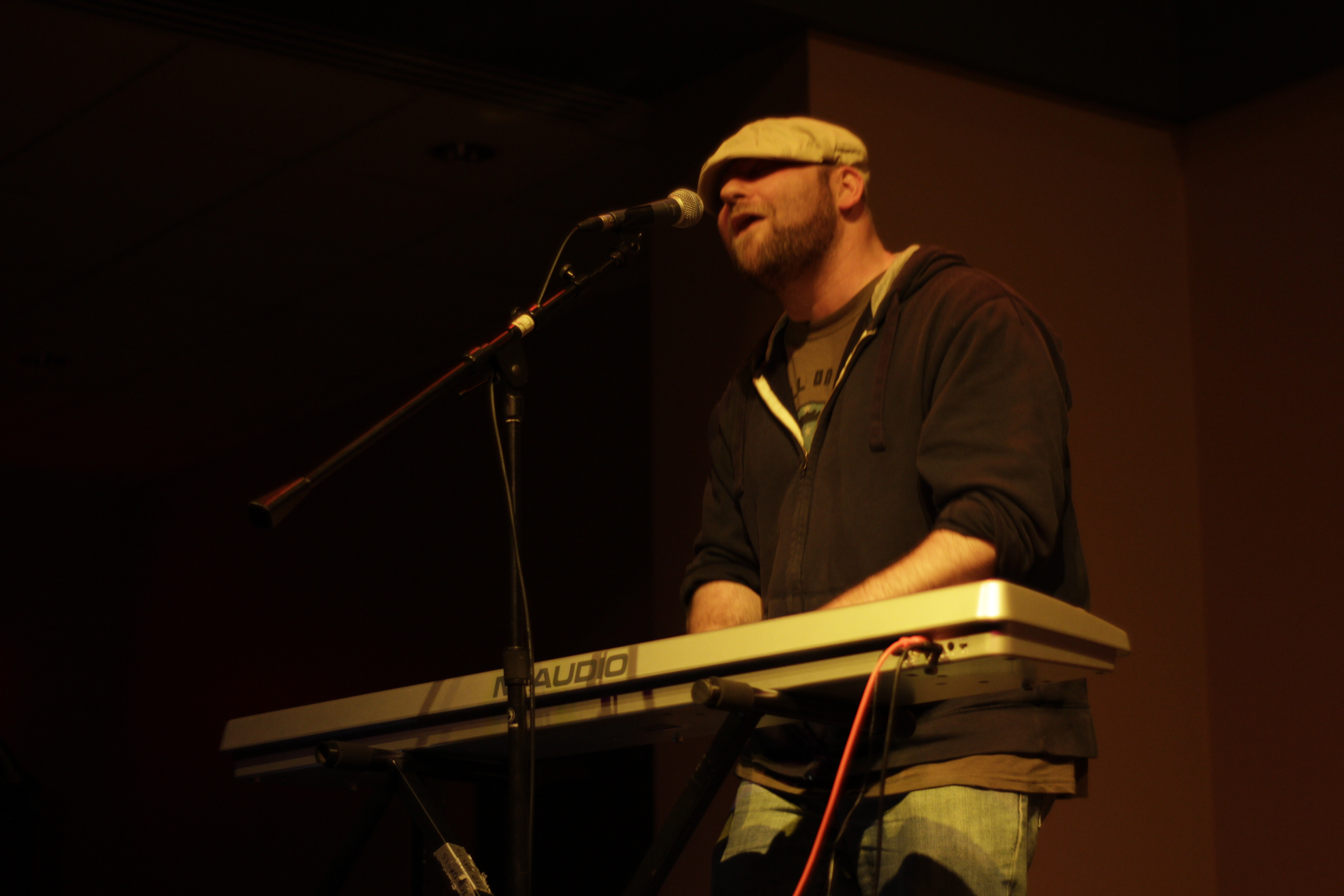
- Jed Davis in concert at The Linda in Albany, NY, on June 14, 2011

Background information
- Born: Jed Ethan Davis; July 7, 1975 (age 51); Farmingdale, New York, United States
- Genres: Indie rock, punk rock, electroclash, alternative rock, power pop
- Occupations: Singer, songwriter, keyboardist, graphic designer, illustrator
- Years active: 1991–present
- Labels: Eschatone, Super K, JAXART, J-Bird Records, SonaBLAST!, No Tomorrow, Rockaway Records
- Website: www.jeddavis.com

Jed Davis (born July 7, 1975 in Farmingdale, New York) is an American musician, songwriter, record producer, graphic artist and multimedia designer based in New York. He has released music as a solo artist and as a member of bands including Skyscape, The Hanslick Rebellion and Collider, and is a co-founder of the independent record label Eschatone Records. His visual and media work has included illustration, animation, social media design and multimedia production for ESPN, graphic design within the New York Mets organization, and print art direction.

== Music career ==
=== Skyscape and early solo work ===
As a high-school senior, keyboardist Davis formed the band Skyscape with vocalist Domenic Maltempi and guitarist Rob Hill in 1991. The group released the album Band of the Week in 1993, followed by Zetacarnosa in 2009 and Dr. Des Moines, which featured Meg Duffy on guitar and backing vocals and Sheridan Riley on drums, in 2016.

After moving to the Albany area to attend the University at Albany, Davis performed in a solo capacity, self-releasing a demo tape titled Jed Has Too Much Free Time in 1994. The demo's 33 songs were recorded on a 4-track cassette recorder by Davis and guitarist Alex Dubovoy in one weekend marathon.

=== The Hanslick Rebellion ===
Davis, Dubovoy and bassist Mike Keaney founded the Hanslick Rebellion in 1995. The group recorded a live album, the rebellion is here., at the QE2 in Albany before disbanding in 1997. Hanslick Rebellion re-formed in 2007; the group's reunion EP The Deli of Life included "You Are Boring the Shit Out of Me", written by Davis. Spin called the song's riff the "year's most undeniable riff", and characterized its music video, directed by Emily Sheskin, as "office-nerd genius".

The Hanslick Rebellion released a rarities compilation, the rebellion was here., in 2015, and a full-length studio album, ashamed of rock and roll., in 2025.

=== J-Bird Records ===
In 1997, Davis signed with Connecticut-based independent label J-Bird Records and released We're All Going to Jail!. J-Bird subsequently put out Everybody Wants to Be Like Jed, a tribute album featuring 20 artists performing Davis's songs, with cover art by Peter Bagge and tracks by Daniel Johnston, Anal Cunt, Brian Dewan, King Missile III, Wesley Willis, and members of Agnostic Front.

=== Collider and the Ramones ===
Davis formed the pre-electroclash band Collider in New York City with guitarist Sean Gould in 1997. The duo's 1998 debut album, Blowing Shit Up, was a mash-up of samples, dance grooves, synthesizers, and rock guitars applied to traditional pop forms and themes. A second Collider album, Physics, followed in 1999.

After meeting Davis in 1999, Joey Ramone took an interest in Collider and introduced Davis to longtime Ramones producer and guitarist Daniel Rey. Ramone also contributed vocals to Davis's song "I Screwed Up". In October 2000, Collider opened for Ramone at what became his final appearance at CBGB.

On the night of Ramone's death on April 15, 2001, after a walk through Manhattan's East Village, Davis wrote "The Bowery Electric" in tribute. Davis played the song for Rey, who passed it to Ramones artistic director Arturo Vega; Vega subsequently played it for former Ramones bassist C. J. Ramone and suggested the surviving Ramones reunite to record it.

In March 2002, Davis recorded "The Bowery Electric" with C. J. Ramone, Marky Ramone and Tommy Ramone, with Rey on guitar. The session marked the first time C. J. and Tommy Ramone had played together and the first time Tommy and Marky Ramone had performed on the same track. Davis later performed the song at CBGB during a concert celebrating what would have been Joey Ramone's 51st birthday, accompanied by C. J. Ramone, Marky Ramone and Rey. "The Bowery Electric" was released as a single on Spanish label No Tomorrow (2002), which featured cover art by Vega and Dee Dee Ramone, and later on the Ramones compilation album The Family Tree (2008).

Tommy Ramone produced Collider's final EP, WCYF, in 2003. He and his wife, Claudia Tienan, also contributed vocals to Davis's cover of Buddy Holly's "Everyday".

Davis continued his association with the Ramones circle after Collider, performing at the Ramones Beat on Cancer benefit in New York in 2004.

In 2025, a Blowing Shit Up remix album, Blowing Blowing Shit Up Up, was released, featuring remixes of most of the album's tracks. Remix producers included Pop Will Eat Itself, Mark Plati, Lo Fidelity Allstars, Dan Book, and Keith Hillebrandt.

=== Rise And Shine ===
Between 2000 and 2005, Davis composed the music and lyrics for a stage musical, Rise And Shine, with librettist Arturo Vega. An attempt to record the musical in album form was aborted after several years of work. Following Vega's death in 2013, Davis resumed work on the recording in tribute to his friend, and the complete recorded score was finished and released in 2024. Its vocal cast includes Dicky Barrett, C. J. Ramone, Brian Dewan, Jessy Moss, Juliana Hatfield, Heather Maloney, Miss Guy, Shea Diamond and Matthew Koma (under his birth name, Matthew Bair), among others.

=== Post-Collider solo projects ===
Davis's 2010 album The Cutting Room Floor compiled finished recordings dating from the Collider period. Davis produced the material, Dave Fridmann served as executive producer and Tony Doogan mixed the album.

In July 2008, Davis recorded material at Electrical Audio in Chicago with engineer Steve Albini. Davis and drummer Joe Abbatantuono recorded live to analog tape. The recording was released as Shoot the Piano Player in 2011, including a limited edition on 8-track tape.

Small Sacrifices Must Be Made! followed in 2012. Davis' band for the album consisted of guitarist Reeves Gabrels, drummer Anton Fig, bassist Graham Maby, and horn player Ralph Carney.

Failing Upwards was released in 2022 and included performances by Tony Levin, Fig, Dweezil Zappa, Carney, Gabrels, Juliana Hatfield, Earl Slick and Meg Duffy.

Davis's band for his 2023 album This Must Be a Place included drummer Sheridan Riley, bassist Chuck Rainey, and Jerry Marotta on Taos drums.

His most recent full-length solo release, Love Is A Many-Tentacled Thing, came out in 2025 and features "Believe It!", a collaboration with the Toilet_Böys' Miss Guy.

=== Jeebus ===
In 2009, Davis and other members of the Hanslick Rebellion teamed with guitarist Reeves Gabrels to tour and record under the band name Jeebus. The resulting album, Jesus Christ's Supercar, featured cover art by Coop_(artist).

=== Session work and collaborations ===
Davis has also worked as a live and session keyboardist, including a stint with Jessica Simpson that included an appearance on the first season of The Apprentice.

Davis was an early collaborator of singer-songwriter Matthew Koma (credited in their work under his birth name, Matthew Bair). Koma's group Bandcamp backed Davis at the 2004 Ramones Beat on Cancer benefit, and Davis subsequently played keyboards on the band's album Wanna Dance?. Koma later performed vocals for the role of Sprocket in Davis's recording of Rise And Shine.

Davis has collaborated with Juliana Hatfield as a musician, producer and visual artist. He designed and illustrated the packaging for Hatfield's 2019 album Weird and directed and animated the music video for "All Right, Yeah", using drawings by Hatfield.

Davis later assisted Hatfield during the making of her 2021 album Blood. Hatfield credited Davis with helping her learn and troubleshoot GarageBand and helped develop song fragments into arrangements, including programming drums and structuring portions of "The Shame of Love". Davis contributed keyboards, drum programming and production to the album and also worked on its packaging design and layout.

Davis contributed keyboards, co-production and cover art to Hatfield's "Christmas Cactus"/"Red Poinsettia" single, and design and layout to Hatfield's 2025 album Lightning Might Strike.

Davis was also involved in the early recording career of Hand Habits, the project of Meg Duffy. He signed Hand Habits to their first record contract, with his label Eschatone, for a split 10-inch release with Sheridan Riley's project Peg. Davis contributed keyboards, engineering and mixing to this EP, which was titled Small Shifts. Duffy has contributed vocals and guitar to many of Davis's recordings, and played guitar on Skyscape's Dr. Des Moines.

A semi-fictionalized version of Davis appears in "Rock Soldiers", the third issue of Mike Dawson and Chris Radtke's comic Gabagool!. In the story, Davis hires the lead characters to retrieve a stolen electric guitar that once belonged to Ace Frehley.

=== Musical style and themes ===
Davis's music has been characterized by melodic songwriting, frequent stylistic shifts, satirical humor and contrasts between whimsical arrangements and darker subject matter. Reviewing The Cutting Room Floor, Sea of Tranquility described his work as melodic alternative-flavored pop and rock, noted his wry wit and compared elements of the album to the early work of Elvis Costello.

Reviews of Davis's recordings have also noted elements of power pop, hard rock, electronic music, atmospheric pop, funk and other styles. His songs frequently employ fictional or exaggerated narrators and combine comic material with themes including alienation, relationships and creative frustration.

Failing Upwards formalized some of those contrasts. Davis structured the album as five pairs of songs approaching similar subjects from opposing perspectives, including relationships, social interaction, creative drive and attitudes toward the past.

In a 2006 interview, Arturo Vega discussed Davis's storytelling and unorthodox use of narrator perspective in the context of their Rise And Shine collaboration: "He writes great stories.... His songs make me wonder, who are these people singing these songs?"

== Eschatone Records ==
Davis co-founded the independent folk-punk record label Eschatone Records in 2006 with Joseph Slevin and Lisa Brennan. The label has released recordings by Davis's projects and other artists, including Brian Dewan, Michael Bassett and Hand Habits. In addition to signing Hand Habits to their first recording contract, Eschatone also gave Daddy Long Legs (musician Brian Hurd, who debuted with The Visitors on Eschatone in 2007) his first record deal.

In 2014, Eschatone released As the River Flows, a collection of previously unreleased recordings made by Jobriath. Davis and Lisa Fancher served as executive producers of the release.

=== Visual art and design ===
Under Davis's creative direction, visual art and arcane formats (including cylinder records, 8-track tapes and 10-inch records) became key components of the Eschatone Records identity. In May 2008, the Zakka artspace in Dumbo, Brooklyn presented The Art of Eschatone Records, an exhibition of artwork associated with the label. The exhibition included work by Brian Dewan, Mike Allred, Michael Doret, Arturo Vega, Hatch Show Print and Angel Marcloid.

Davis often collaborates with other visual artists and designers for his and Eschatone's musical releases. Michael Doret created the vintage-style center label used by Eschatone Records. Davis and Doret had previously worked together while Davis was an art director at Promo magazine, where Davis commissioned Doret to create magazine covers.

Doret later designed packaging for Davis's limited-edition cylinder-record release "Yuppie Exodus From Dumbo". The edition consisted of 50 signed and numbered copies. Doret also designed the Jeebus logo and the cover artwork used for the physical edition of Shoot the Piano Player.

Psychedelic artist Victor Moscoso created the cover artwork for The Cutting Room Floor. Comic book artist Mike Allred drew the cover of Skyscape's Zetacarnosa. Illustrator Coop created the cover artwork for Jeebus's Jesus Christ's Supercar.

In 2003, street artist Richard Hambleton created an original painting for a Collider concert poster. The work, Shadow Head Portrait (Rubin Face Illusion), was later documented by Woodward Gallery as the original artwork for the Collider poster.

== Design and media career ==
=== Editorial design and art direction ===
Parallel to his music career, Davis worked in editorial design and art direction, including a stint as senior art director of Direct and Promo magazines for Penton Media. Davis arranged the Promo cover shoot with Zebbler and Sean Stevens, participants in the 2007 Boston guerrilla-marketing incident, making a late-night drive from New York to Boston with photographer Dirk Eusterbrock and returning in time for the next morning's deadline.

A Direct cover illustrated by Drew Friedman under Davis's art direction was selected for Politics '08, an exhibition of political illustration at the Society of Illustrators' Museum of American Illustration. The exhibited watercolor, Candidates WI-FI, depicted Barack Obama, Hillary Clinton and John McCain using computers in a Wi-Fi cafe.

In a 2009 article in FPO about maintaining editorial-design quality during a period of shrinking magazine budgets, Davis discussed using photo subjects' on-hand materials as props to generate compelling imagery, experimenting with color and typography, and commissioning illustrators and photographers.

=== ESPN and social media ===
Davis later worked as a senior designer for ESPN, producing social media graphics, illustration, animation and motion design.

Davis's notable ESPN work included graphics promoting the 2020 documentary series The Last Dance, the 2-8-24 Kobe Bryant photoillustration, and a number of highly-engaged hand-drawn illustrations including pieces involving Tom Brady and the Golden State Warriors.

In a 2023 ESPN feature about its social media design team, Davis discussed his approach to graphics produced during the NCAA Division I women's basketball tournament. Discussing an Iowa project involving Caitlin Clark, Davis said social graphics should look like "candy"—"bright, colorful, bold, and easy to understand"—and described using available photography and team colors as sources of visual inspiration.

Some of Davis's ESPN work combined music production with graphic design and animation. His credited work includes roles as composer and music producer as well as graphic designer, illustrator and motion designer, often all on the same project.

For ESPN's "The Ceiling is the Roof" social media video, Davis was credited as music composer, graphic designer and motion designer. He also produced music and created graphic and motion design for other ESPN social media videos, including high-engagement pieces involving Kawhi Leonard and LeBron James.

In 2021, Davis composed and produced the music and created motion design for a sea-shanty remix video built around commentary by Stephen A. Smith and published on Smith's TikTok.

=== New York Mets organization and other sports-media work ===
Davis later worked within the New York Mets organization, designing graphics and social media content.

Davis has also contributed to social media projects for NFL teams, including character design and illustration for the Jacksonville Jaguars animated 2024 schedule release video, and musical social content for the Arizona Cardinals.

== Discography ==
=== Solo ===
- Jed Has Too Much Free Time (cassette, 1994)
- We're All Going to Jail! (CD, J-Bird, 1997)
- Jed Davis Wastes 8 Years of His Life for Your Listening Pleasure (CD, J-Bird, 1999)
- In the Presence of Presents 2003 (digital-only, 2003)
- In the Presence of Presents 2006 (digital-only, 2006)
- I Am Jed Davis! (CD, Eschatone, 2009)
- "Yuppie Exodus from Dumbo" (single, cylinder record, Eschatone, 2010)
- The Cutting Room Floor (CD/vinyl, Eschatone, 2010)
- Shoot the Piano Player (8-track/vinyl, Eschatone, 2011)
- Live at CB's Gallery (digital-only, Eschatone, 2011)
- Small Sacrifices Must Be Made! (CD/vinyl, Eschatone, 2012)
- In the Presence of Presents 2017 (digital-only, Eschatone, 2017)
- Antijinx (vinyl, Eschatone, 2022)
- Failing Upwards (vinyl, Eschatone, 2022)
- This Must Be a Place (vinyl, Eschatone, 2023)
- Rise And Shine (digital-only, Eschatone, 2024)
- Love Is A Many-Tentacled Thing (vinyl, Eschatone, 2025)

=== Skyscape ===
- Band of the Week (CD/cassette, Low-Sodium, 1993)
- Zetacarnosa (digital-only, Eschatone, 2009)
- Dr. Des Moines (vinyl, Eschatone, 2016)

=== The Hanslick Rebellion ===
- the rebellion is here. (cassette, 1995)
- the rebellion is here. (reissue, CD, Eschatone, 2005)
- The Deli of Life (CD, Eschatone, 2007)
- Let's Get to the Fucking (digital-only, Eschatone, 2008)
- the rebellion was here. (digital-only, Eschatone, 2015)
- ashamed of rock and roll. (vinyl, Eschatone, 2025)

=== Collider ===
- Blowing Shit Up (CD, Eschatonality, 1998)
- Physics (CD, Eschatonality/MP3.com, 1999)
- Amateur Hour: A Global Tribute to Sparks compilation, performing "I Predict" and "Something for the Girl with Everything" (CD, Fan Mael, 1999)
- WCYF (CD, SonaBLAST!, 2003)
- Todos Somos Ramones compilation, performing "I Can't Make It on Time" (CD, Rockaway, 2005)
- Blowing Shit Up (reissue, vinyl, Eschatone, 2025)
- Blowing Blowing Shit Up Up (vinyl, Eschatone, 2025)

=== The Congregation of Vapors ===
- "With Love from America" (single, CD, Eschatone, 2004)

=== Jeebus ===
- Jesus Christ's Supercar (vinyl, Eschatone, 2020)

=== Other appearances ===
- Bandcamp, Wanna Dance?, keyboards (CD, EVLA, 2005)
- Black Queen Speaks, Campeador, keyboards (2011)
- The Bowery Electric Crew, "The Bowery Electric", keyboards/vocals (single, 7" vinyl/CD, No Tomorrow, 2002)
- Ramones, The Family Tree, keyboards/vocals (CD, Rockaway, 2008)
- Jessica Simpson, The Apprentice - The Complete First Season, keyboards (DVD, NBC, 2004)
- Sunday Girl, Sunday Girl, keyboards/vocals/producer (2004)
- TOE, TOE, keyboards (CD, J-Bird, 1999)
- The Visitors, The Visitors, piano/organ (CD, Eschatone, 2007)
- Hand Habits, Small Shifts, keyboards/engineer/mixing (10" vinyl, Eschatone, 2013)
- David Schulman, Gone to Shame, keyboards/vocals/engineer/producer (2016)
- Juliana Hatfield, "Christmas Cactus/Red Poinsettia", keyboards/co-producer (single, 7" vinyl, American Laundromat, 2020)
- Juliana Hatfield, Blood, keyboards/co-producer (CD/vinyl/cassette, American Laundromat, 2021)
- Juliana Hatfield, "Lotta Love", keyboards/co-producer (single, 7" vinyl, American Laundromat, 2023)
