= Sevendys =

- Genres: alternative rock, experimental rock, soul, rhythm and blues
- Years active: 2010–present
- Labels: JAXART, Eschatone
- Members: Jed Davis; Avi Zahner-Isenberg; Sheridan Riley; Chuck Rainey; Jerry Marotta
- Website: music.sevendys.com

Sevendys is a collaborative musical project featuring rock musicians of several generations. The quintet of Jed Davis (keyboards/vocals), Avi Zahner-Isenberg (guitars/vocals), Sheridan Riley (drums/vocals), Chuck Rainey (bass) and Jerry Marotta (percussion/vocals) has recorded a dozen songs over three recording sessions since forming in 2010.

Sevendys' first single, "So So Close"/"When I Step Off The Train", was released in 2011 on limited-edition signed and numbered red vinyl by JAXART.
