= Sean Stevens =

American artist and inventor (1978–2026)

- Born: July 24, 1978
- Died: March 23, 2026 (aged 47)
- Occupations: Artist, inventor
- Known for: 2007 Boston Mooninite panic

Sean Stevens (July 24, 1978 – March 23, 2026) was an American artist and inventor known for his involvement in the 2007 Boston Mooninite panic and for creating Sustainable Sound, a pedal-powered sound system.

== 2007 Boston Mooninite panic ==
In January 2007, Stevens, then 28 and living in Charlestown, Massachusetts, was one of two men hired to place LED promotional signs for Aqua Teen Hunger Force Colon Movie Film for Theaters around Boston, Cambridge, and Somerville. Interference, a New York-based guerrilla marketing firm working for Turner Broadcasting System (TBS), hired Stevens and Peter Berdovsky for the campaign. A 2022 retrospective described Stevens as part of Boston's tech-art scene and said he and Berdovsky were paid $300 each for the work.

After the devices were mistaken for possible explosive devices, Stevens and Berdovsky were arrested and charged with placing a hoax device and disorderly conduct. They pleaded not guilty and were released on $2,500 cash bond. Boston.com later wrote that a post-arrest press conference by Stevens and Berdovsky, in which they declined to answer questions unrelated to "haircuts of the '70s", circulated widely online.

In May 2007, prosecutors dropped the charges after Stevens and Berdovsky apologized in Charlestown District Court and completed community service at the Spaulding Rehabilitation Center in Boston. Multichannel News reported that Stevens completed 60 hours of community service.

== Sustainable Sound and later work ==
In 2011, WBUR-FM profiled Stevens as the inventor of Sustainable Sound, a human-powered sound and lighting system in which stationary bicycles generate electricity. Reuters described the system as being built from scrap materials such as old bicycle parts and plywood and reported that it was used during a performance by the Boston band Melodeego at Johnny D's in Somerville, Massachusetts. WBUR reported that Stevens had used the system at colleges, environmental rallies, dance parties, arts festivals including Burning Man, and in the woods of Vermont. By 2011, Stevens and Melodeego had raised more than $14,000 toward a mobile ten-bike version of the system.

A 2022 retrospective in Inverse said that Stevens later continued making interactive art, taught for several years, moved to San Francisco, and founded a nonprofit creative space there called Momentum.

== Death ==
On March 23, 2026, it was announced by Berdovsky on his social media that Stevens had died after suffering from cancer for several years. He was 47.
