= Country Music Foundation =

American non-profit organization

The Country Music Foundation (CMF) chartered by the state of Tennessee in 1964, is a non-profit organization dedicated to the preservation and education surrounding country music. The CMF currently employs more than 70 full-time professionals and is "the world's largest research center devoted to a single form of popular music."

== Mission statement ==
"The Country Music Foundation, Inc. (CMF) is dedicated to preserving and teaching the evolving history of country music—from its early, traditional roots to its present-day manifestations as a community-based music and a thriving form of popular culture."

== Location ==
The Country Music Foundation was originally located with the first Country Music Hall of Fame and Museum at the corner of 16th Avenue and Division on Music Row in Nashville, TN. The Country Music Foundation is still housed with the Hall of Fame and Museum at its new location at 222 5th Avenue South in Downtown Nashville when the new building opened in 2001.

== History ==
The CMF was founded in 1964 and charged with operating the Country Music Hall of Fame and Museum, whose original location opened on Music Row in Nashville, TN on April 1, 1967. Until 1971, the CMF shared staff with the Country Music Association (CMA). It moved locations in 2001 to the new Country Music Hall of Fame and Museum in downtown Nashville.

== Programs ==
- CMF Press
- CMF Records
- Country Music Foundation Library (1968)

Open by appointment only, the library is available to CMF staff, schools, music industry, and the media. "Library holdings presently include more than 175,000 recorded discs, 8,000 books, 450 periodicals, 150,000 photographs, and thousands of songbooks, films, business documents, and other materials."

== Publications ==
=== Print ===
- Journal of Country Music
- Will the Circle Be Unbroken: Country Music in America (2006)
- new and out-of print titles in partnership with the Vanderbilt University Press

=== Recordings ===
The CMF regularly produces and consults for other labels' historic performances, and itself issued the first historic recording on their Country Music Foundation Records label, which preceded later releases including:

- The Bristol Sessions (1987)
- Hank Williams: Rare Demos, First to Last (1990)
- Johnny Paycheck: The Real Mr. Heartache: The Little Darlin' Years (1996)
- From Where I Stand: The Black Experience in Country Music (1998), Warner Bros. Records Inc.

—

== Historic Sites ==
- Hatch Show Print (1986)
- RCA Studio B (1977)
