= Collider (band) =

American electroclash punk rock band

- Origin: New York, NY, United States
- Genres: Electroclash, alternative rock, power pop, punk rock, indie rock
- Years active: 1997–2004
- Labels: Eschatonality, SonaBLAST!, Rockaway Records, Fan Mael
- Past members: Jed Davis; Sean Gould; Mike Keaney; Joe Abba; Daniel Ahren; Bonnie Bowers; Mike Casale; Jim Colletti; Chris DeRosa; Alex Dubovoy; Steve Friedman; Tom Kaz; Mike Kearns; Anne-Marie Stehn

Collider was an electroclash punk rock band formed in New York City in 1997 by singer and keyboardist Jed Davis and guitarist Sean Gould. The duo's combination of electronic beats and synthesizers with rock guitars and pop song structure made Collider an early entrant to the Electroclash movement. In fact, as the genre had not yet been named, Davis and Gould referred to their style as "electropunk".

Between 1997 and 1999, Collider performed regularly across New York state but concentrated mainly on Manhattan's Lower East Side. In addition to frequent gigs at CBGB, the Mercury Lounge and the Spiral, the duo also played monthly at Coney Island High.

Collider's first two albums, Blowing Shit Up (1998) and Physics (1999), were released by New York label Eschatonality, the latter in conjunction with MP3.com.

In 2000, Davis and Gould added a rhythm section of Chris DeRosa on Drums and Tom Kaz on Bass and toned down the electronic elements as the band moved towards straightforward punk rock. In this form, the band came to the attention of Joey Ramone, who invited Collider to open for him at what would be his final CBGB appearance, on October 18, 2000. This version of Collider was also the support act when Living Colour reunited at CBGB on December 21, 2000.

In 2002, with a new rhythm section of Mike Keaney (bass) and Joe Abba (drums), Collider signed with SonaBLAST! Records and recorded a 6-song EP, WCYF, with original Ramones drummer and producer Tommy Ramone producing. WCYF would be the first album produced by Tommy Ramone since The Replacements' Tim in 1985.

This version of Collider served as the live backing band for Maverick Records singing duo The Deuce Project in 2003, and as a session group for a number of singers and duos in New York City and Boston, Massachusetts. Davis and Gould disbanded Collider in 2004 in order to pursue other projects.

In 2025, Blowing Shit Up was reissued by Eschatone Records, getting a vinyl release for the first time. A Blowing Shit Up remix album, Blowing Blowing Shit Up Up, was simultaneously released, featuring remixes of most of the album's tracks. Remix producers included Pop Will Eat Itself, Mark Plati, Lo Fidelity Allstars, Dan Book, and Keith Hillebrandt.
