= Fad =

Collective behavior that achieves short-lived popularity

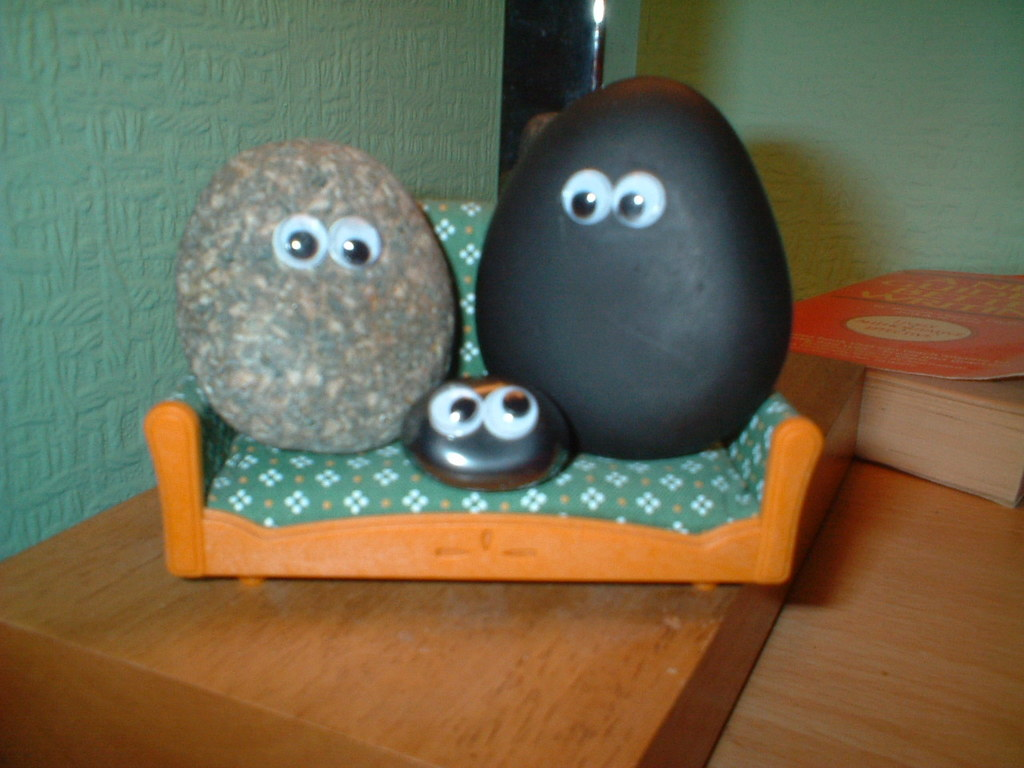
Pet rocks were a short-lived fad in the 1970s.

A man performing the floss, a dance move that became popular in 2017

A fad, trend, or craze is any form of collective behavior that develops within a culture, a generation, or social group in which a group of people enthusiastically follow an impulse for a short time period. Fads, also known as trends, are products or behaviors that achieve short-lived popularity but fade away. Fads are often seen as sudden, quick-spreading, and short-lived events. Fads include diets, clothing, hairstyles, toys, and more. Some fads in the last hundred years include stanley cups, toys such as yo-yos, and hula hoops, and fad dances such as the Macarena, floss and the twist.

Similar to habits or customs but less durable, fads often result from an activity or behavior being perceived as popular or exciting within a peer group, or being deemed "cool" as often promoted by social networks. A fad is said to "catch on" when the number of people adopting it begins to increase to the point of being noteworthy or going viral. Fads often fade quickly when the perception of novelty is gone.

== Overview ==
The specific nature of the behavior associated with a fad can be of any type, including unusual language usage, distinctive clothing, fad diets, or frauds such as pyramid schemes. Apart from general novelty, mass marketing, emotional blackmail, peer pressure, or the desire to conformity may drive fads. Popular celebrities can also drive fads, for example the highly popularizing effect of Oprah's Book Club. Although some consider the term trend equivalent to fad, a fad is generally considered a quick and short behavior, whereas a trend is one that evolves into a long-term or even permanent change.

=== Economics ===
In economics, the term is used in a similar way. Fads are mean-reverting deviations from intrinsic value caused by social or psychological forces similar to those that cause fashions in political philosophies or consumerisation.

== Formation ==
Many contemporary fads share similar patterns of social organization. Several different models serve to examine fads and how they spread. One way of looking at the spread of fads is through the top-down model, which argues that fashion is created for the elite, and from the elite, fashion spreads to the lower classes. Early adopters might not necessarily be those of a high status, but they have sufficient resources that allow them to experiment with new innovations. When looking at the top-down model, sociologists like to highlight the role of selection. The elite might be the ones who introduce certain fads, but other people must choose to adopt those fads.

Others may argue that not all fads begin with their adopters. Social life already provides people with ideas that can help create a basis for new and innovative fads. Companies can look at what people are already interested in and create something from that information. The ideas behind fads are not always original; they might stem from what is already popular at the time. Recreation and style faddists may try out variations of a basic pattern or idea already in existence.

Another way of looking at the spread of fads is through the lens of symbolic interactionism, a sociological theory that explains people's actions as being directed by shared meanings and assumptions. People learn their behaviors from those around them; when it comes to collective behavior, the emergence of these shared rules, meanings, and emotions are more dependent on the cues in the situation, rather than physiological arousal. A symbolic interactionist perspective, then, suggests that fads are spread because people attach meaning and emotion to objects, rather than because the object has practical use. People may adopt a fad because of the meanings and assumptions they share with the other people who have adopted that fad. They may join other adopters of the fad because they enjoy being a part of a group and what that symbolizes, and they may wish to feel like an insider. When a number of people adopt the same fad, they may feel like they have made the right choice because they see that others have also made that same choice.

== Termination ==
Primarily, fads end because all innovative possibilities have been exhausted. Fads begin to fade when people no longer see them as new and unique. As more people follow the fad, some might start to see it as "overcrowded", and it no longer holds the same appeal. Many times, those who first adopt the fad also abandon it first. They begin to recognize that their preoccupation with the fad leads them to neglect some of their routine activities, and they realize the negative aspects of their behavior. Once the faddists are no longer producing new variations of the fad, people begin to realize their neglect of other activities, and the dangers of the fad. Not everyone completely abandons the fad, however, and parts may remain.

A study examined why certain fads die out quicker than others. A marketing professor at the University of Pennsylvania's Wharton School of Business, Jonah Berger and his colleague, Gael Le Mens, studied baby names in the United States and France to help explore the termination of fads. According to their results, the faster the names became popular, the faster they lost their popularity. They also found that the least successful names overall were those that caught on most quickly.

== Collective behavior ==
Fads can fit under the broad umbrella of collective behavior, which are behaviors engaged in by a large but loosely connected group of people. Other than fads, collective behavior includes the activities of people in crowds, panics, fashions, crazes, and more. Robert E. Park, the man who created the term collective behavior, defined it as "the behavior of individuals under the influence of an impulse that is common and collective, an impulse, in other words, that is the result of social interaction". Fads are seen as impulsive, driven by emotions; however, they can bring together groups of people who may not have much in common other than their investment in the fad.

== Collective obsession ==
Fads can also fit under the umbrella of "collective obsessions". Collective obsessions have three main features in common. The first, and most obvious sign, is an increase in frequency and intensity of a specific belief or behavior. A fad's popularity increases quickly in frequency and intensity, whereas a trend grows more slowly. The second is that the behavior is seen as ridiculous, irrational, or evil to the people who are not a part of the obsession. Some people might see those who follow certain fads as unreasonable and irrational. To these people, the fad is ridiculous, and people's obsession of it is just as ridiculous. The third is, after it has reached a peak, it drops off abruptly and then it is followed by a counter obsession. A counter obsession means that once the fad is over, if one engages in the fad they will be ridiculed. A fad's popularity often decreases at a rapid rate once its novelty wears off. Some people might start to criticize the fad after pointing out that it is no longer popular, so it must not have been "worth the hype".

== See also ==
- 15 minutes of fame
- Bandwagon effect
- Bellwether (1996 novel)
- Category:Fads (notable fads through history)
- Cool (aesthetic)
- Coolhunting
- Crowd psychology
- Google Trends
- Hype
- List of Internet phenomena
- Market analysis (also market trend)
- Memetics
- Peer pressure
- Retro style
- Social contagion
- Social mania
- Viral phenomenon
