= Country Music Hall of Fame and Museum =

Coordinates: 36°09′30″N 86°46′34″W

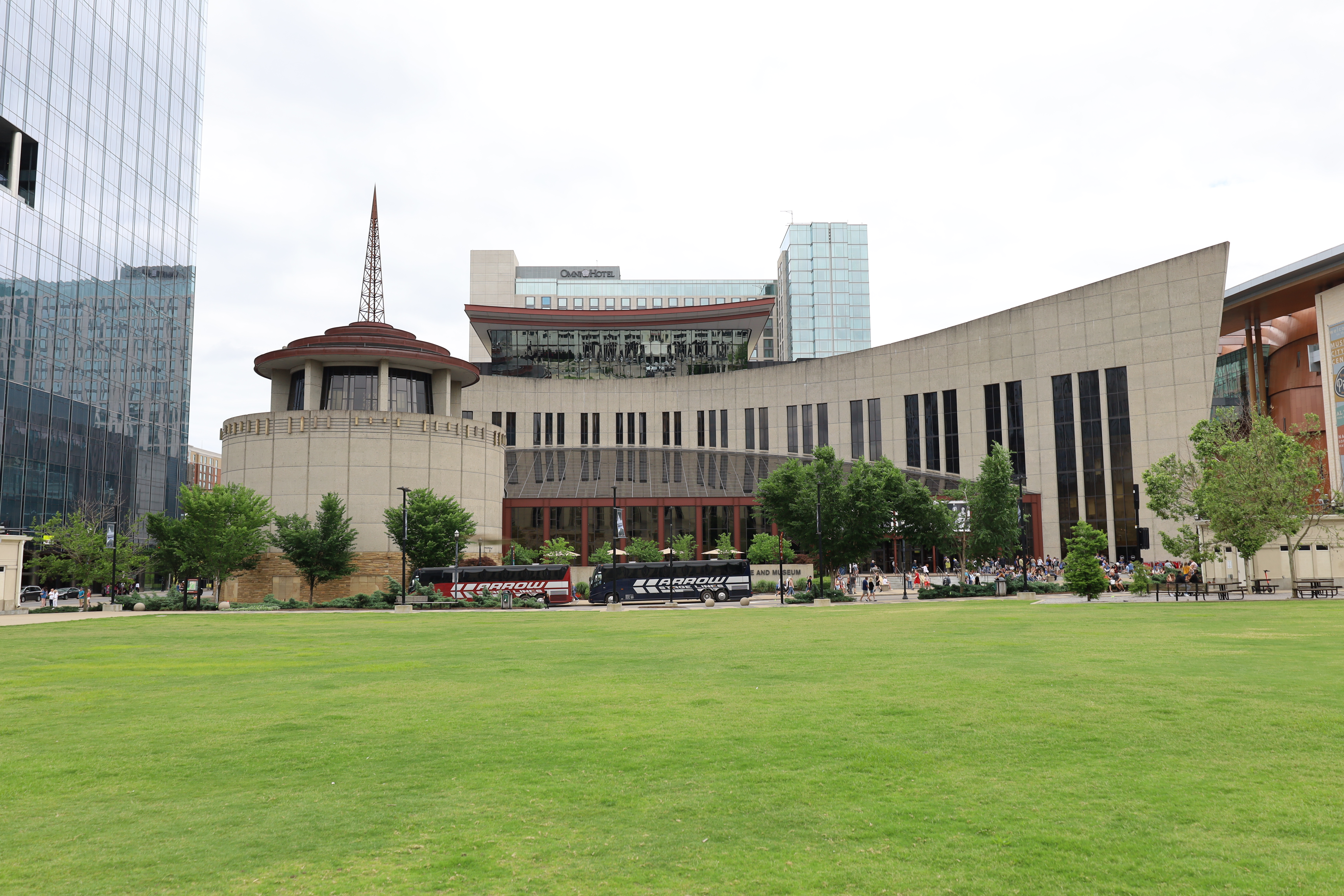
- The front of the building in 2022
- Established: 1967
- Location: 222 Rep. John Lewis Way S Nashville, Tennessee 37203
- Type: History museum
- Visitors: ~ 1,600,000 (2023)
- Director: Kyle Young
- Website: www.countrymusichalloffame.org

The Country Music Hall of Fame and Museum in Nashville, Tennessee, is one of the world's largest museums and research centers dedicated to the preservation and interpretation of American country music. Chartered in 1964, the museum has amassed one of the world's most extensive musical collections.

== History of the museum ==
The Country Music Hall of Fame and Museum is the world's largest repository of country music artifacts. Early in the 1960s, as the Country Music Association's (CMA) campaign to publicize country music was accelerating, CMA leaders determined that a new organization was needed to operate a country music museum and related activities beyond CMA's scope as simply a trade organization. Toward this end, the nonprofit Country Music Foundation (CMF) was chartered by the state of Tennessee in 1964 to collect, preserve, and publicize information and artifacts relating to the history of country music. Through CMF, industry leaders raised money with the effort of CMA Executive Director Jo Walker-Meador to build the Country Music Hall of Fame and Museum. The CMA Building Committee engaged the services of Martin Jenter, of Jenter Exhibits, Inc., to research and design the interior exhibits. Work was completed by the firm at its Mount Vernon, N.Y. plant, and the components were shipped in moving vans to Nashville, where they were assembled for the grand opening on April 1, 1967. The original building exterior was built by the architectural firm W.B. Cambron & Co., Inc., designed as a barn-shaped structure located at the head of Music Row, erected on the site of a small Nashville city park. This hall of fame was modeled after the National Baseball Hall of Fame and Museum in Cooperstown, New York. Artifacts began to be displayed and a small library was begun in a loft above one of the museum's galleries.

Early in the 1970s, the basement of the museum building was partially complete, and library expansion began, embracing not only recordings, but also books and periodicals, sheet music and songbooks, photographs, business documents, and other materials. At the outset, CMA staff had run the museum, but by 1972, the museum (already governed by its own independent board of directors) acquired its own small staff.

Building expansion took place in 1974, 1977, and 1984 to store and display the museum's growing collection of costumes, films, historic cars, musical instruments, and other artifacts. An education department was created to conduct ongoing programs with Middle Tennessee schools; an oral history program was begun; and a publications department was launched to handle books, as well as the Journal of Country Music.

Charlie Pride was the first African American inducted into the hall of fame (inducted in 2000).

== Current museum ==
To become more accessible, the Country Music Hall of Fame and Museum moved to a new, 140,000-square-foot (13,000 m^{2}) facility in the heart of downtown Nashville's arts and entertainment district in May 2001. In 2014, the museum unveiled a $100 million expansion, doubling its size to 350,000 square feet of galleries, archival storage, education classrooms, retail stores, and special event space.

In the museum's core exhibition, Sing Me Back Home: A Journey Through Country Music, visitors are immersed in the history and sounds of country music. The story is revealed through artifacts, photographs, text panels, recorded sound, vintage video, and interactive touchscreens. Sing Me Back Home is enhanced by rotating limited-engagement exhibits. The ACM Gallery and the Dinah and Fred Gretsch Family Gallery features artifacts from today's country stars and a series of technology-enhanced activities. The ACM Gallery houses the annual exhibition, American Currents: State of Music, which chronicles country music's most recent past.

In addition to the galleries, the museum has the 776-seat CMA Theater, the Taylor Swift Education Center, and multi-purpose event rental spaces. Other historic properties of the Country Music Hall of Fame and Museum include one of the country's oldest letterpress print shop Hatch Show Print (located inside the museum) and Historic RCA Studio B (located on Music Row), Nashville's oldest surviving recording studio, where recordings by Country Music Hall of Fame members Elvis Presley, Dolly Parton, Waylon Jennings, and many others were made.

The Country Music Hall of Fame and Museum has developed multiple platforms to make its collection accessible to a wider audience. From weekly instrument demonstrations to its flagship songwriting program for schools, Words & Music, the museum offers an aggressive schedule of educational and family programs. The museum also operates CMF Records, a Grammy-winning re-issue label (The Complete Hank Williams and Night Train to Nashville: Music City Rhythm & Blues, 1945–1970); and CMF Press, a publishing imprint that has released books in cooperation with Vanderbilt University Press and other major trade publishing houses.

The Hall of Fame Rotunda features a mural, The Sources of Country Music, by Thomas Hart Benton. It was Benton's final work; as he died in his studio while completing it.

== The Country Music Hall of Fame ==
For a professional in the country music field, membership in the Country Music Hall of Fame, is the highest honor the genre can bestow. An invitation can be extended to performers, songwriters, broadcasters, musicians, and executives in recognition of their contributions to the development of country music. The hall of fame honor was created in 1961 by the Country Music Association (CMA); the first inductees were Hank Williams, Jimmie Rodgers, and Fred Rose. Roy Acuff, the first living artist to join the Hall of Fame, was elected in 1962. The most recent inductees (class of 2025) are Tony Brown, June Carter Cash, and Kenny Chesney.

Over the Hall of Fame's history, the number of new members inducted each year has varied from one to twelve (no nominee was inducted in 1963, no candidate having received sufficient votes). Election to the Country Music Hall of Fame is solely the prerogative of the CMA. New members, elected annually by a panel of industry executives chosen by the CMA, are inducted formally during the Medallion Ceremony, part of the annual reunion of Country Music Hall of Fame members hosted by the Country Music Hall of Fame and Museum. The Country Music Hall of Fame® and Museum is a 501(c)(3) non-profit educational organization and does not participate in the election.

Bas-relief portraits (similar to that in the Baseball Hall of Fame in New York) cast in bronze honoring each Hall of Fame member were originally displayed at the Tennessee State Museum in downtown Nashville until the Country Music Hall of Fame and Museum opened its own building in April 1967; in this barn-roofed facility at the head of Music Row, the bronze plaques formed a special exhibit. Through a licensing agreement with the CMA, the Museum exhibits the bronze plaques commemorating membership in a space and fashion befitting the honor.

== The Museum collection ==
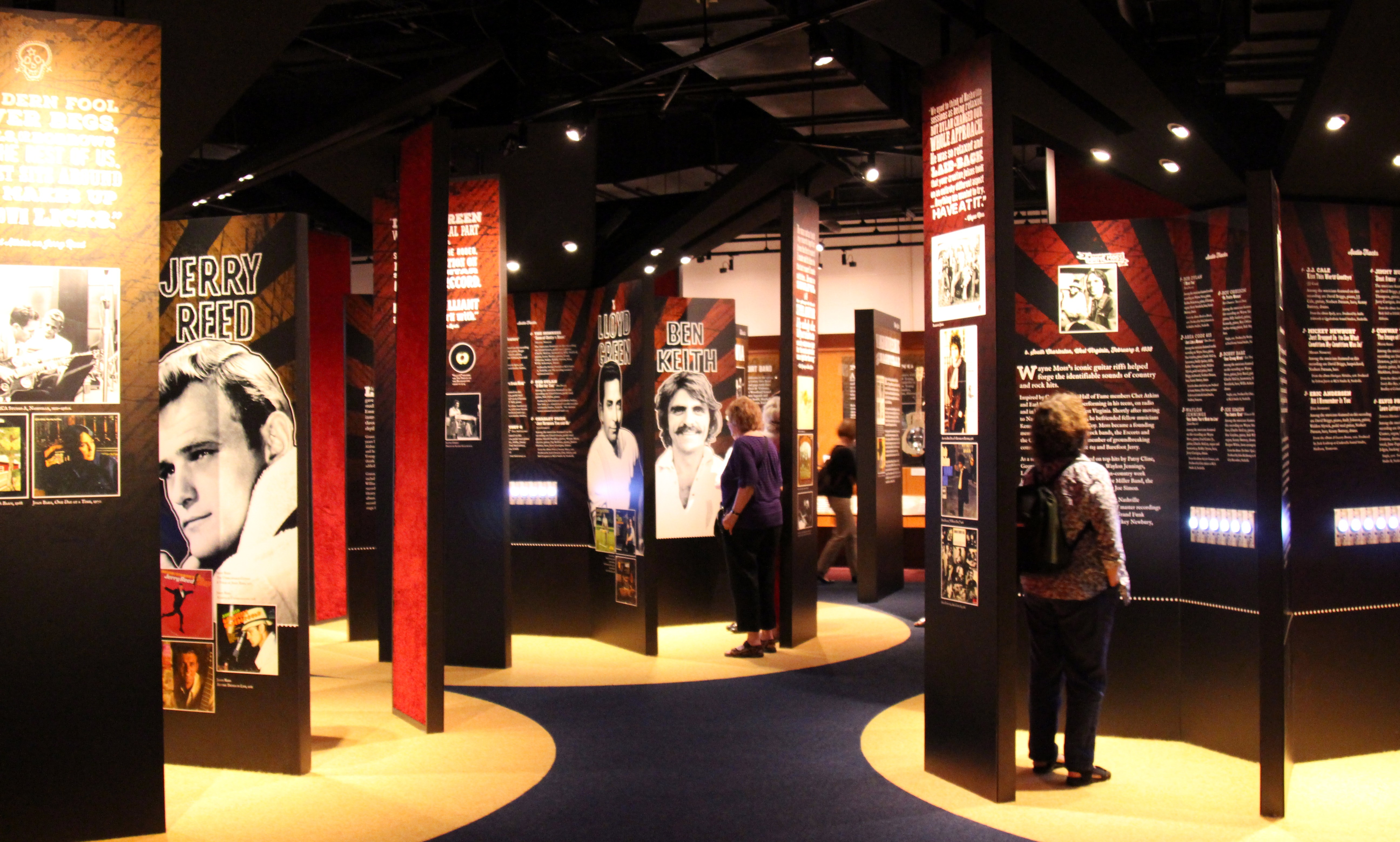
Inside the museum

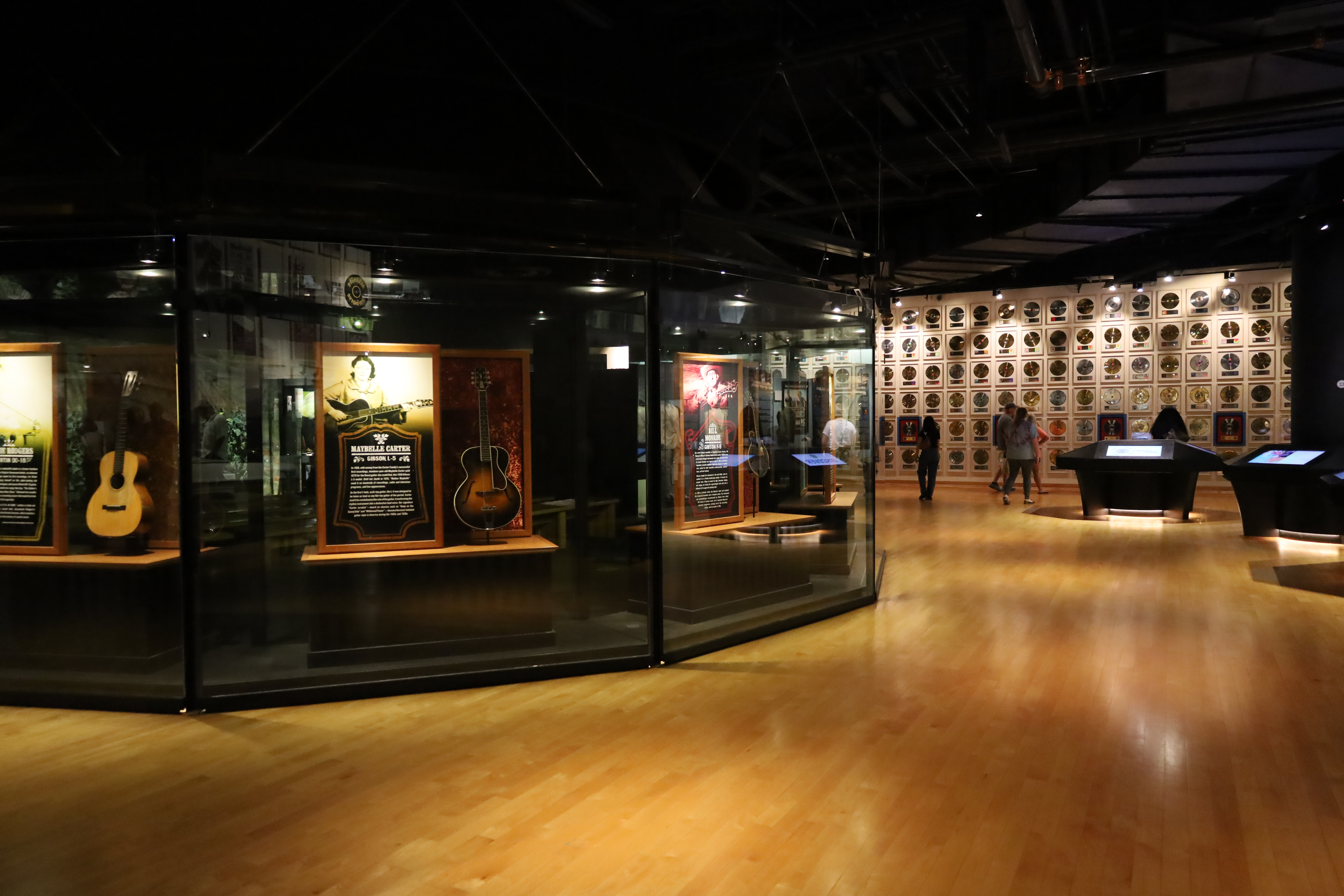
Part of the museum's collections

The museum's collections document country music from its folk roots through today. Artifacts and archival materials not on exhibit are housed in the museum's 46,000 square foot secure, climate-controlled collections storage rooms and in the Frist Library and Archives, located on museum's third floor. The collection includes:

- The Bob Pinson Recorded Sound Collection comprising over 250,000 sound recordings, including an estimated 98% of all pre-World War II country recordings released commercially
- Approximately 500,000 photographic prints, negatives, transparencies and digital images
- More than 30,000 moving images on film, video and digital formats
- Over 900 musical instruments, including Mother Maybelle Carter's Gibson L-5 guitar, Bob Wills's fiddle, Chet Atkins's 1950 D'Angelico archtop guitar and Bill Monroe's mandolin
- Thousands of stage costumes and accessories, from rhinestone-encrusted "Nudie suits" to homemade cotton dresses, formal gowns, cowboy boots, hats, and jeans
- Oral histories, handwritten song manuscripts, scrapbooks, correspondence, fan club newsletters, sheet music, business documents, periodicals, and books
- Iconic Vehicles: Elvis Presley's 1960 "Solid Gold" Cadillac limousine, Webb Pierce's 1962 Pontiac Bonneville convertible, and Jerry Reed's 1980 Pontiac Trans Am from Smokey and the Bandit II.

== Architecture and design ==
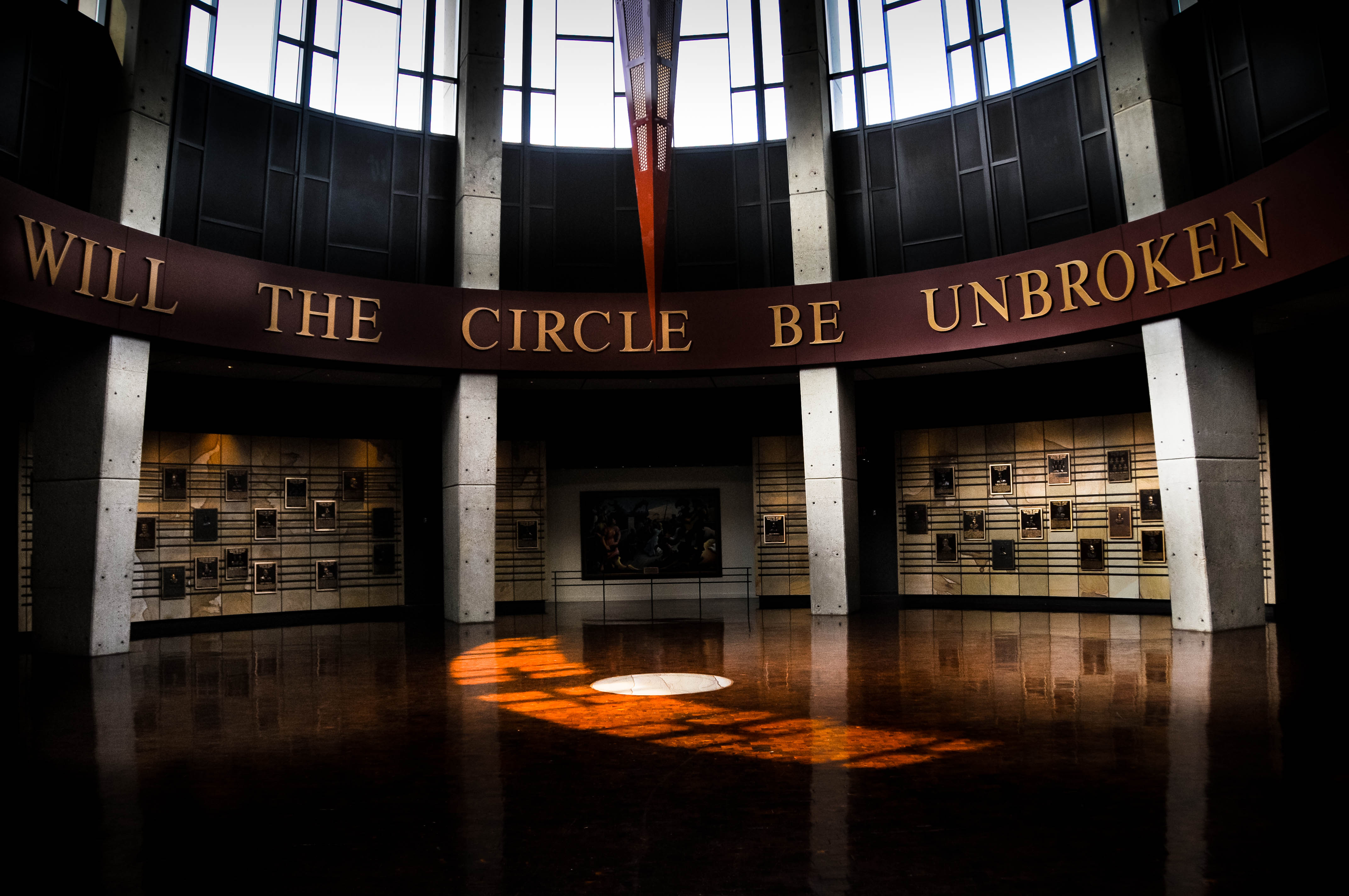
A view of the Rotunda

The downtown building was designed by Nashville's Tuck-Hinton Architectural Firm with Seab Tuck as the project architect. When viewed from the air, the building forms a massive bass clef. The point on the sweeping arch of the building suggests the tailfin of a 1959 Cadillac sedan. The building's front windows resemble piano keys. The tower on top of the Rotunda that extends down the Hall of Fame is a replica of the distinctive diamond-shaped WSM radio tower, which was originally built in 1932 just south of Nashville and is still in operation.

The Rotunda itself is replete with symbolic architectural elements. For example, the exterior of this cylindrical structure can be viewed variously as a drum kit, a rural water tower, or grain silo. The four disc tiers of the Rotunda's roof evoke the evolution of recording technology—the 78, the vinyl LP, the 45, and the CD. Stone bars on the Rotunda's outside wall symbolize the notes of the Carter Family's classic song "Will the Circle Be Unbroken", while the title of the song rings the interior of the structure. The Hall of Fame member's plaques housed within the Rotunda are reminiscent of notes on a musical staff.

Solid, earthy materials native to the Mid-South—wood, concrete, steel, and stone—were used in the building's construction as a reminder of the music's strong roots in the lives of working Americans. Georgia yellow pine adorns the floors of the Conservatory and is also found in the Hall of Fame Rotunda the Ford Theater. Crab Orchard Stone from the East Tennessee mountains lend a homey, rustic touch to the Conservatory's "front porch" atmosphere and is also found on the Rotunda's walls. The large steel beams supporting the Conservatory's glass ceiling and walls conjure up images of rural railroad bridges. In another transportation metaphor, the cascading water along the Grand Staircase calls to mind the mighty rivers that have inspired so much of our nation's music and have physically connected musicians in various regions of the nations.

Musical symbolism continues within the museum galleries. Hardwood floors, curtain-like exhibit-case fronts, and low hanging lights suspended by cables create the backstage atmosphere of the Third Floor. Similarly, modular exhibit stations and vinyl floors evoke a recording studio environment on the Second Floor.

== See also ==
- List of Country Music Hall of Fame inductees
- List of music museums
