= 2007 Boston Mooninite panic =

2007 mass panic

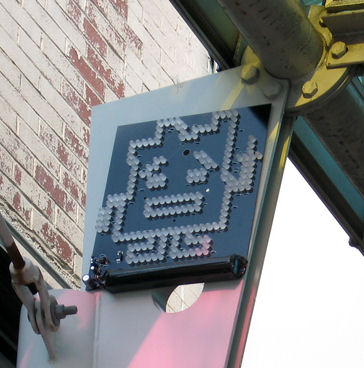
- An LED display resembling the cartoon character Ignignokt from Aqua Teen Hunger Force giving the finger as seen in Cambridge, Massachusetts
- Date: January 31, 2007
- Time: 8:05 a.m. – 3:00 p.m.
- Location: Boston, Cambridge, and Somerville, Massachusetts, U.S.
- Type: Guerrilla marketing campaign, falsely identified as a bomb threat
- Organized by: Interference, Inc.
- Participants: Peter "Zebbler" Berdovsky; Sean Stevens

On the morning of January 31, 2007, the Boston Police Department and the Boston Fire Department mistakenly identified battery-powered LED placards depicting the Mooninites, characters from the Adult Swim animated television series Aqua Teen Hunger Force, as improvised explosive devices (IEDs), leading to a massive panic. Placed throughout the U.S city of Boston, Massachusetts, and the surrounding cities of Cambridge and Somerville by Peter "Zebbler" Berdovsky and Sean Stevens, these devices were part of a nationwide guerrilla marketing advertising campaign for Aqua Teen Hunger Force Colon Movie Film for Theaters.

The massive panic led to controversy and criticism from U.S. media sources, including The Boston Globe, Los Angeles Times, Fox News, The San Francisco Chronicle, The New York Times, CNN, and The Boston Herald. Some ridiculed the city's response to the devices—including the arrests of the two men hired to place the placards around the area—as disproportionate and indicative of a generation gap between city officials and the younger residents of Boston, at whom the ads were targeted. Several sources noted that the hundreds of officers in the Boston police department or city emergency planning office on scene were unable to identify the figure depicted for several hours until a young staffer at Mayor Thomas Menino's office saw the media coverage and recognized the figures.

After the devices were removed, the Boston Police Department stated in its defense that the ad devices shared some similarities with improvised explosive devices, with them also discovering an identifiable power source, a circuit board with exposed wiring, and electrical tape. Investigators were not mollified by the discovery that the devices were not explosive in nature, stating they still intended to determine "if this event was a hoax or something else entirely". Although city prosecutors eventually concluded there was no ill intent involved in the placing of the ads, the city continues to refer to the event as a "bomb hoax" (implying intent) rather than a "bomb scare". A deal was reached in which Berdovsky and Stevens agreed to carry out community service and issue a public apology, and Attorney General Martha Coakley admitted that the state could not prove that the pair had any intent to incite panic. Government agencies extracted several million dollars from Turner Broadcasting and Interference, Inc., which was used to pay police who participated in the hysteria.

Reflecting years later, various academics and media sources have characterized the phenomenon as a form of social panic. Gregory Bergman wrote in his 2008 book BizzWords that the devices were basically a self-made form of the children's toy Lite-Brite. Bruce Schneier wrote in his 2009 book Schneier on Security that Boston officials were "ridiculed" for their overreaction to the incident. In his 2009 book Secret Agents, historian and communication professor Jeremy Packer discussed a cultural phenomenon called the "panic discourse" and described the incident as a "spectacular instance of this panic". In a 2012 article, The Boston Phoenix called the incident the "Great Mooninite Panic of 2007". A 2013 publication by WGBH wrote that the majority of Boston youth thought that the arrests of two men who placed devices were not justified.

== Planning ==
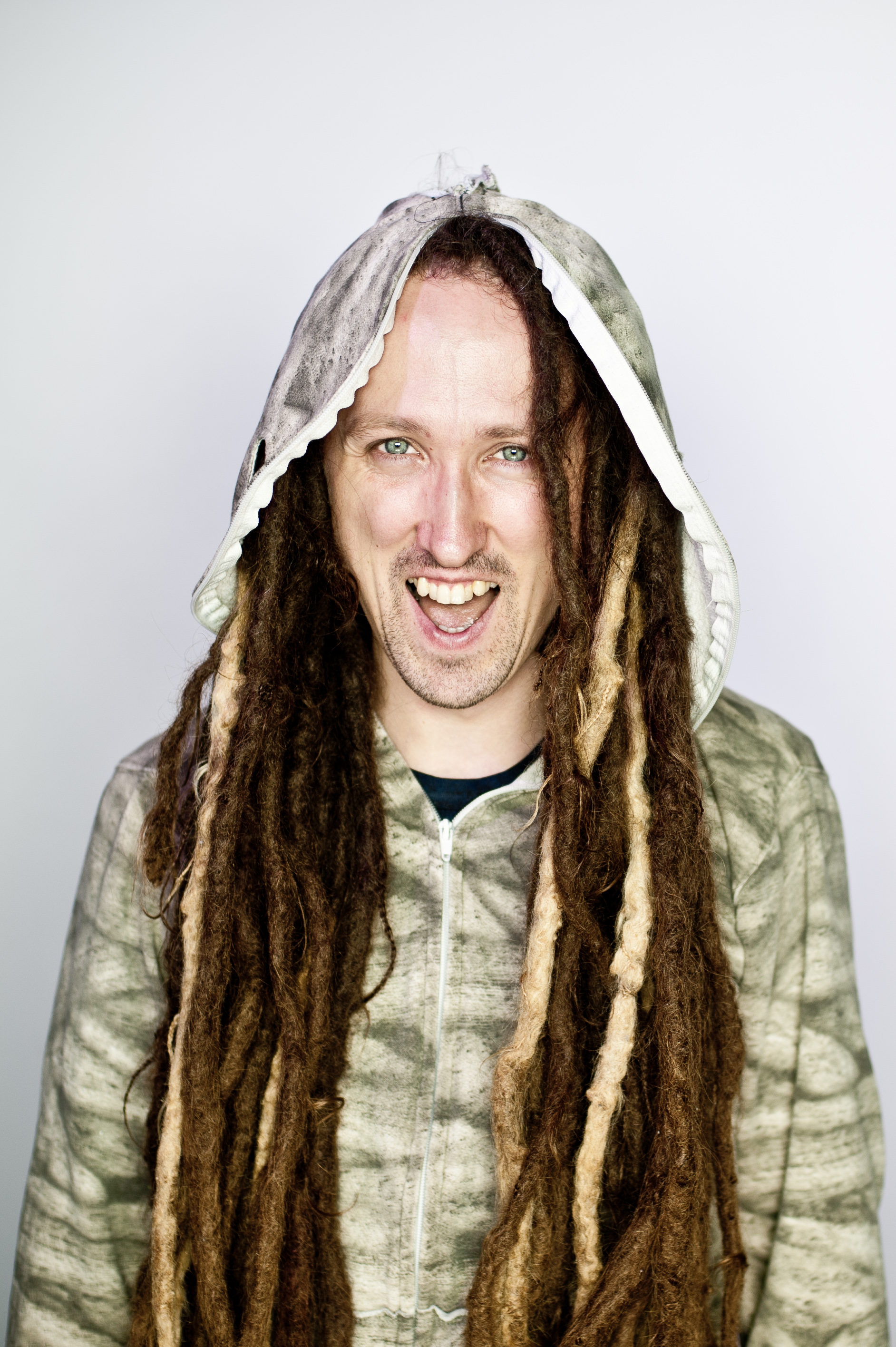
Peter "Zebbler" Berdovsky was one of the men involved with installing the displays

In November 2006, Boston area artist Peter "Zebbler" Berdovsky met a man named John, who worked for a marketing organization named Interference, Inc., in New York City. John then asked Berdovsky if he would be interested in working on a promotional project, with Berdovsky agreeing and enlisting Sean Stevens. Interference shipped Berdovsky 40 electronic signs, and Adrienne Yee of Interference emailed him a list of suggested locations and a list of things not to do. According to police, the suggested locations for the devices included train stations, overpasses, hip/trendy areas, and high traffic/high visibility areas. The signs were to be put up discreetly overnight, with Berdovsky and Stevens being paid $300 each for their assistance.

Berdovsky, Stevens, and Dana Seaver put up 20 magnetic lights in mid January, dubbing the activity "Boston Mission 1". While Stevens and Berdovsky put up the lights, Seaver recorded the activity on video and sent a copy to Interference. On the night of January 29, 2007, in what was called "Boston Mission 2", 18 more magnetic lights were placed. This included one under Interstate 93 at Sullivan Square, in Charlestown.

=== Devices ===
The devices used were promotional electronic placards for the forthcoming Aqua Teen Hunger Force Colon Movie Film for Theaters. Each device, measuring about 1 by 1.5 feet (30 by 45 cm), consisted of a strap of D-batteries and electrical tape following installation.

The LED lights were arranged to represent the Mooninite characters Ignignokt and Err displaying the middle finger. Massachusetts Attorney General Martha Coakley said that the device "had a very sinister appearance. It had a battery behind it, and wires". Others compared the displays to the Lite-Brite electric toy.

== Subsequent panic ==
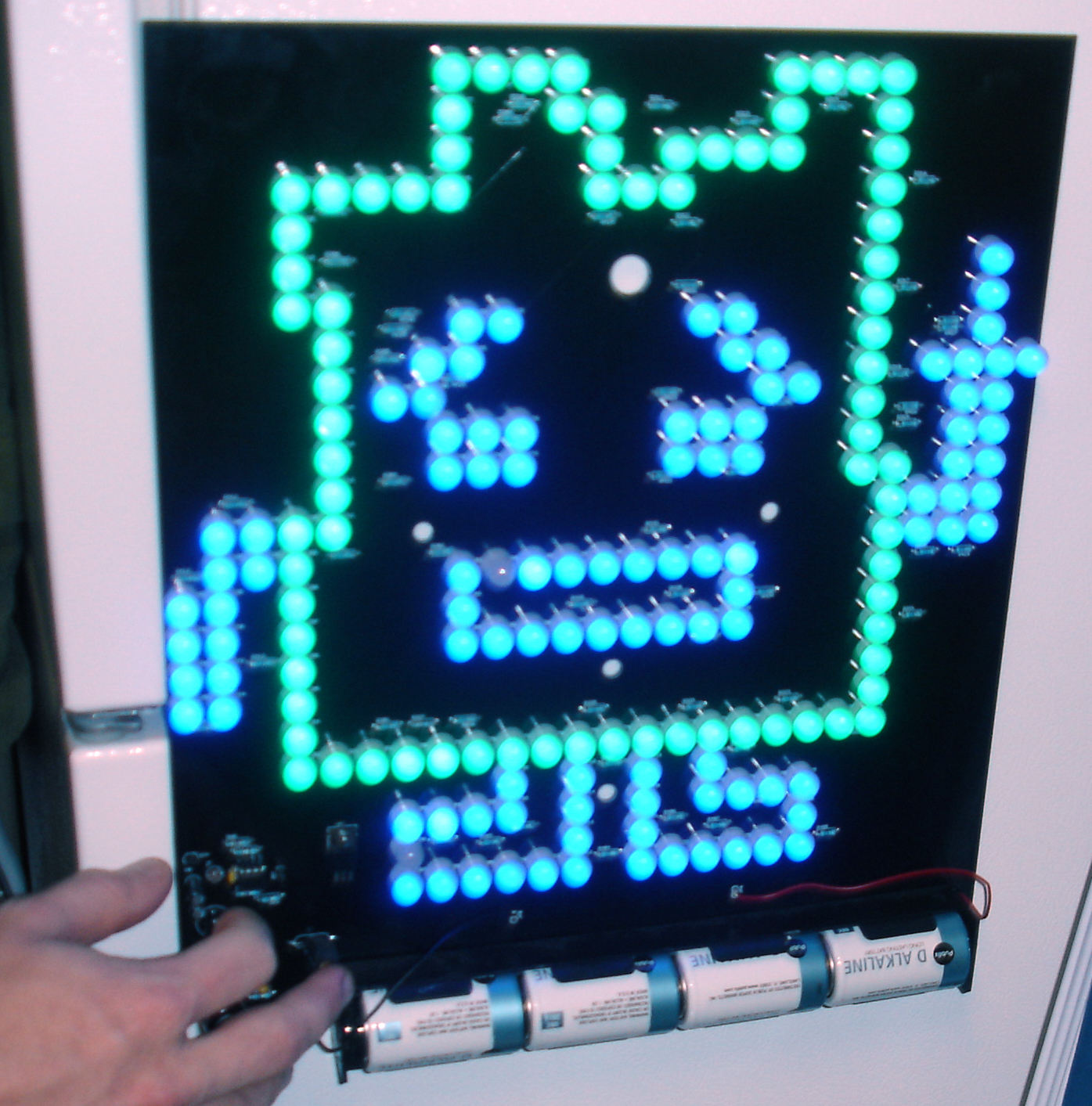
Close-up of one of the LED displays while being lit

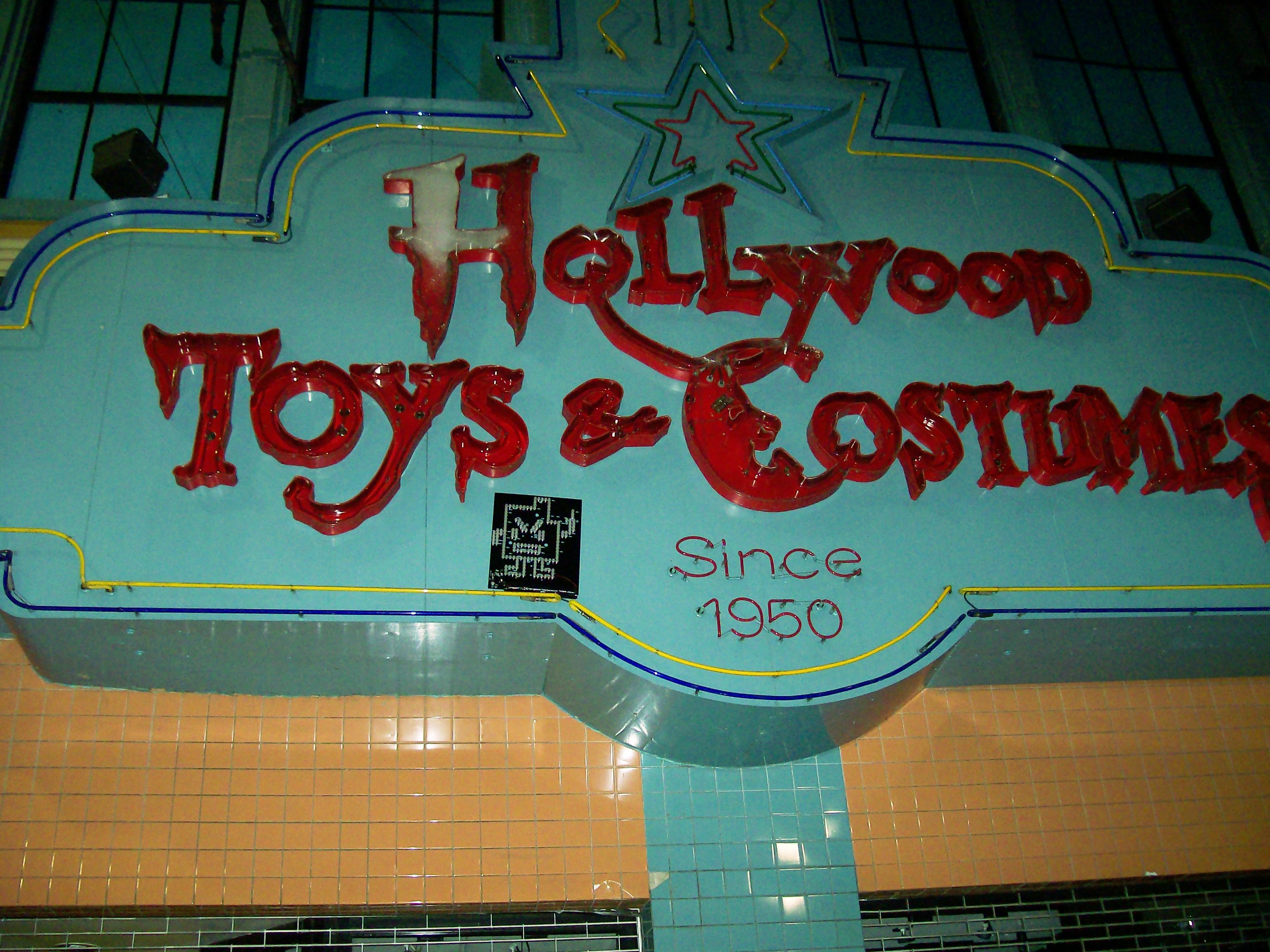
One of the displays located in Los Angeles

On January 31, 2007, at 8:05 a.m., a civilian spotted one of the devices on a stanchion that supports an elevated section of Interstate 93 (I-93), above Sullivan Station and told a policeman from the Massachusetts Bay Transportation Authority (MBTA) of its presence. At 9 a.m., the Boston Police Department bomb squad received a phone call from the MBTA requesting assistance in identifying the device. Authorities responded with what the Boston Globe described as "[an] army of emergency vehicles" at the scene, including police cruisers, fire trucks, ambulances, and the Boston Police Department bomb squad. Also present were live TV crews, a large crowd of onlookers, and helicopters circling overhead. Peter Berdovsky arrived at the scene and video recorded the situation. He recognized the device under police investigation, but made no attempt to inform them. He returned to his apartment and contacted Interference. Interference told him that they would handle informing the police and that he should personally say nothing about the situation.

During the preliminary investigation at the site, police found that the devices resembled improvised explosive devices. Similarities included a noticeable power source, circuit board with exposed wiring, and electrical tape. After the initial assessment, Boston police shut down the northbound side of I-93 and parts of the public transportation system. Just after 10 a.m., the bomb squad used a small explosive filled with water to destroy the device as a precaution. MBTA Transit police Lieutenant Salvatore Venturelli told the media at the scene, "This is a perfect example of our passengers taking part in homeland security." He refused to describe the object in detail because of the ongoing investigation, responding only that "It's not consistent with equipment that would be there normally." Investigators were trying to determine "if it was a hoax or something else entirely", according to Venturelli. Northbound I-93 reopened to traffic about 10:05 a.m. By 10:21 a.m., the police timeline reported it as "some sort of hoax device".

At 12:54 p.m., Boston police received a call identifying another device located at the intersection of Stuart and Charles Street. At 1:11 p.m., the Massachusetts State Police requested assistance from the bomb squad with devices found under the Longfellow and Boston University bridges. Both bridges were closed as a precaution, and the Coast Guard closed the river to boat traffic.

At 1:26 p.m., friends of Peter Berdovsky received an email from him, which alleged that five hours into the scare, an Interference Inc. executive requested Berdovsky to "keep everything on the dl". Later, Travis Vautour, a friend of Berdovsky, confirmed that he would be staying quiet while the situation was being reported. Two hours later, Interference notified their client, Cartoon Network. Between 2 and 3 p.m., a police analyst identified the image on the devices as an Aqua Teen Hunger Force cartoon character, and police concluded the incident was a publicity stunt. Turner Broadcasting System issued a statement concerning the event around 4:30 p.m. Portions of the Turner statement stated that they regretted the devices being mistaken for danger, and assured that they were not. They further clarified that they were part of an outdoor marketing campaign in 10 cities to promote Adult Swim's animated television show Aqua Teen Hunger Force. They also said that they had been in place for two to three weeks in Boston, New York City, Los Angeles, Chicago, Atlanta, Seattle, Portland, Austin, San Francisco, and Philadelphia. Parent company Turner Broadcasting was in contact with local and federal law enforcement on the exact locations of the billboards.

Some devices had been up for two weeks in the cities listed before the Boston incident occurred, although no installation permits were ever secured. Berdovsky and Stevens were arrested by Boston police during the evening of January 31, and charged with violating Chapter 266: Section 102A1/2 of the General Laws of Massachusetts, which states that it is illegal to display a "hoax device" with the motive to cause citizens to feel threatened, unsafe, and concerned.

=== Reactions ===
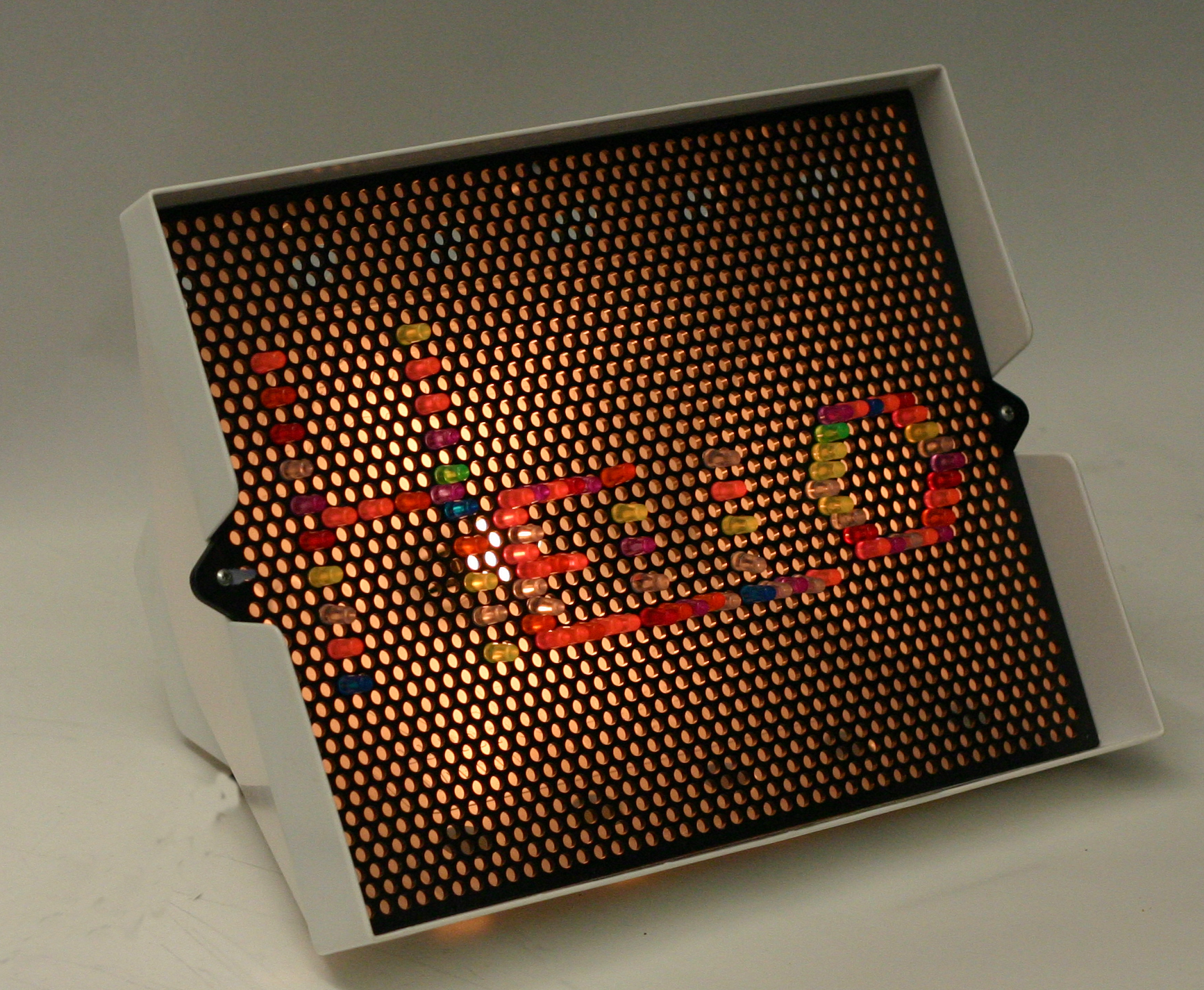
An example of a Lite-Brite toy, to which the devices had been compared by many at the time

News about the situation quickly spread around residents and the news. The Boston Globe stated that the "marketing gambit exposes a wide generation gap", quoting one 29-year-old blogger, writing, "Repeat after me, authorities. L-E-D. Not I-E-D. Get it?" The Brainiac blog earned praise from other media outlets for its timely coverage of events, even as the paper continued to report on simply "suspicious objects".

Los Angeles Times editorials derided the reaction of Boston's officials, remarking, "Emergency personnel and anti-terrorism squads shut down more than a dozen highways, transit stations, and other locations across the city Wednesday after receiving reports about multiple suspicious devices." They also went on to describe the devices, stating that they "had dozens of colored lights, exposed wires, and circuitry, and were powered by a row of D batteries wrapped in black tape." They also compared the devices to a bigger version of Hasbro's Lite-Brite, referring to the Lite-Brites as "a toy for artistic grade schoolers." Bruce Schneier summed up the incident as a "non-terrorist embarrassment in Boston".

The Boston Herald stated that part of the reaction in the response could be blamed on two packages that did not blink. According to Boston Police Commissioner Ed Davis, phony pipe bombs were also discovered that day, one inside Tufts-New England Medical Center at 1 p.m. A security guard described "an agitated white male" fleeing saying, "God is warning you that today is going to be a sad day." The Herald went on to characterize the placement of the devices as a "coordinated hoax". Davis also mentioned other incidents of the day that may have influenced the reaction, including a Washington, D.C. metro stop being shut down due to a suspected package, and fumes emanating from a package at a post office in New York City, resulting in four people being treated there. "It was almost like we had a kind of perfect storm of circumstances falling into place", Davis said.

The advertising magazine Brandweek said that the incident, which they labeled a fiasco, would cause marketers to "steer clear of guerrilla tactics until the controversy around the Aqua Teen Hunger Force stunt-turned-bomb-scare in Boston dies down". It further said that the incident "will no doubt be followed by a reassessment of the potential price of what used to be known as a low-cost method to generate buzz".

According to Fox News, fans of Aqua Teen Hunger Force mocked Boston officials during the press conference of Berdovsky and Stevens, calling the arrests an overreaction, while holding signs supporting the actions of the two. These signs, which featured recreations of the Mooninites on the devices, had slogans such as "Free Peter" and "1-31-07 Never Forget", satirizing Mayor Tom Menino's mentions of 9/11. Newspapers quoted local residents, including "We all thought it was pretty funny", "The majority of us recognize the difference between a bomb and a Lite-Brite", and that the police's response was "silly and insane ... we're the laughingstock". Something Positive, a webcomic written and drawn by Waltham resident R. K. Milholland, also weighed in on the issue.

Karl Carter of Atlanta-based Guerrilla Tactics Media said only fans of Aqua Teen Hunger Force would recognize the characters or think it was funny. He said, "This is probably better set up for nightclubs and other sorts of scenarios where the people that are receiving the message, one, would know what it's about, but also two, wouldn't be frightened. You know, if you put these in certain environments, like public spaces in this post-9/11 sensitivity, then of course you're going to wind up in trouble." Make magazine editor Phillip Torrone said that the advertisers should have used better judgment, but called it a "neat electronic project". Boing Boing reported that the media and the State of Massachusetts insisted on using the words "bomb hoax", despite firm contentions by Turner Broadcasting Systems that the devices were not intended to resemble bombs and the company had no intent to arouse suspicion or panic in approving the advertising campaign.

On February 27, 2007, a month after the incident, the Boston police bomb squad detonated another suspected bomb, which turned out to be a city-owned traffic counter. On March 18, 2007, at the annual St. Patrick's Day Breakfast in South Boston, Massachusetts, politicians joked about the panic over the Mooninite devices. Tom Menino, the mayor who had compared the devices to 9/11, said that it was a good way to obtain a local aid package for the city, referring to the $1 million in "good faith money for homeland security" that Cartoon Network paid the city of Boston to avoid a lawsuit. Congressman Stephen Lynch joked that the Mooninites were part of a sleeper cell including SpongeBob SquarePants and Scrappy-Doo. State Treasurer Timothy P. Cahill held up a picture of a Mooninite with Mitt Romney's face on it, saying "We had to blur out his real feelings about Massachusetts."

=== Aftermath ===
On February 5, 2007, state and local agencies came to an agreement with both Turner Broadcasting and Interference, Inc., to pay for costs incurred in the incident. As part of the settlement, which resolves any potential civil or criminal claims against the companies, Turner and Interference agreed to pay $2 million: $1 million to go to the Boston Police Department and $1 million to the Department of Homeland Security. This was in addition to the companies' apologies, which local authorities deemed too little as announced by Dan Conley, district attorney for Suffolk County, Massachusetts, in a speech on NECN, saying the people who are responsible for this "reckless stunt" are liable for the havoc it caused to both the city and the region.

On February 9, 2007, the week after the panic, Cartoon Network's general manager and executive vice president, Jim Samples, resigned "in recognition of the gravity of the situation that occurred under my watch", and with the "hope that my decision allows us to put this chapter behind us and get back to our mission of delivering unrivaled original animated entertainment for consumers of all ages". Stuart Snyder was named his successor.

In total, ten cities were involved in the marketing campaign, which began two to three weeks before the incident. The NYPD contacted Interference, Inc., to request a list of 41 locations where the devices were installed. Officers were able to locate and remove only two devices, both located near 33rd Street and West Side Highway at the High Line overpass. The NYPD did not receive any complaints about the devices, according to police spokesman Paul Brown. At 9:30 p.m., on the evening of January 31, the Chicago Police Department received a list of installation locations from Interference, Inc. Police recovered and disposed of 20 of the 35 devices. Police Superintendent Philip Cline admonished those responsible for the campaign, stating, "one of the devices could have easily been mistaken for a bomb and set off enough panic to alarm the entire city". Cline went on to say that, on February 1, he asked Turner Broadcasting to reimburse the city for funds spent on locating and disposing of the devices.

The King County Sheriff's spokesman John Urquhart stated, "In this day and age, whenever anything remotely suspicious shows up, people get concerned—and that's good. However, people don't need to be concerned about this. These are cartoon characters giving the finger."

Interference, Inc., hired two people to distribute twenty devices throughout Philadelphia on January 11. One of these was Ryan, a 24-year-old from Fishtown, who claimed that he was promised $300 for installing the devices, only 18 of which were actually functional. Following the scare in Boston, the Philadelphia Police Department recovered three of the 18 devices. Joe Grace, spokesman for Philadelphia Mayor John F. Street, said, "We think it was a stupid, regrettable, irresponsible stunt by Turner. We do not take kindly to it." A cease-and-desist letter was sent to Turner, threatening fines for violating zoning codes.

No devices were retrieved in Los Angeles and Lieutenant Paul Vernon of the Los Angeles Police Department stated that "no one perceived them as a threat". The many Los Angeles signs were up without incident for more than two weeks prior to the Boston scare. Police Sergeant Brian Schmautz stated that officers in Portland had not been dispatched to remove the devices, and did not plan to unless they were found on municipal property. He added, "At this point, we wouldn't even begin an investigation, because there's no reason to believe a crime has occurred." A device was placed inside 11th Ave. Liquor on Hawthorne Boulevard in Portland, where it remains. San Francisco Police Sergeant Neville Gittens said that Interference, Inc., was removing them, except for one found by art gallery owner Jamie Alexander, who reportedly "thought it was cool" and had it taken down after it ceased to function.

Berdovsky and Stevens were arrested on the day of the incident and charged with placing a hoax device to incite panic, a felony charge that carries a five-year maximum sentence, and one count of disorderly conduct, a misdemeanor. Both pleaded not guilty to the two charges and were later released on a $2,500 cash bond. At their arraignment, Assistant Attorney General John Grossman claimed that the two were trying to "get attention by causing fear and unrest that there was a bomb in that location". Michael Rich, the lawyer representing both men, disputed Grossman's claim, asserting that even a VCR could be found to fit the description of a bomb-like device. Judge Leary said that it would be necessary for the prosecution to demonstrate an intent on the part of the suspects to cause a panic. The judge continued, "It appears the suspects had no such intent ... but the question should be discussed in a later hearing."

On March 1, 2007, Senator Edward Kennedy, D-MA, introduced S.735, "The Terrorist Hoax Improvements Act of 2007". Its amendments include these:

the federal criminal code to: (1) extend the prohibition against conveying false information and hoaxes to any federal crime of terrorism; (2) increase maximum prison terms for hoaxes involving a member of the Armed Forces during war; (3) allow a civil remedy for damages resulting from hoaxes perpetrated by an individual who later fails to provide accurate information to investigating authorities about the actual nature of the incident; and (4) extend the prohibition against mailing threatening communications to include corporations or governmental entities (as well as individuals).

The bill never came to a vote.

On May 11, 2007, prosecutors decided not to pursue criminal charges against Berdovsky and Stevens, in exchange for community service and a public apology. Attorney General Martha Coakley cited the difficulty in proving intent to incite panic on the part of the two men and called the deal "an appropriate and fair resolution". Berdovsky and Stevens completed 80 and 60 hours of community service at the Spaulding Rehabilitation Center in Boston, respectively. The incident prompted opportunists to acquire the promotional devices from other cities and auction them on eBay, with prices ranging from $500 to more than $5,000.

An Aqua Teen Hunger Force episode from season five titled "Boston" was produced as the series creators' response to the bomb scare, but Adult Swim canceled it to avoid further controversy. The unfinished episode was later leaked online in January 2015. However, the episode was referenced in the Season 5 DVD sleeve, as a Mooninite appears in it, dressed as Osama bin Laden.

== Historical legacy ==
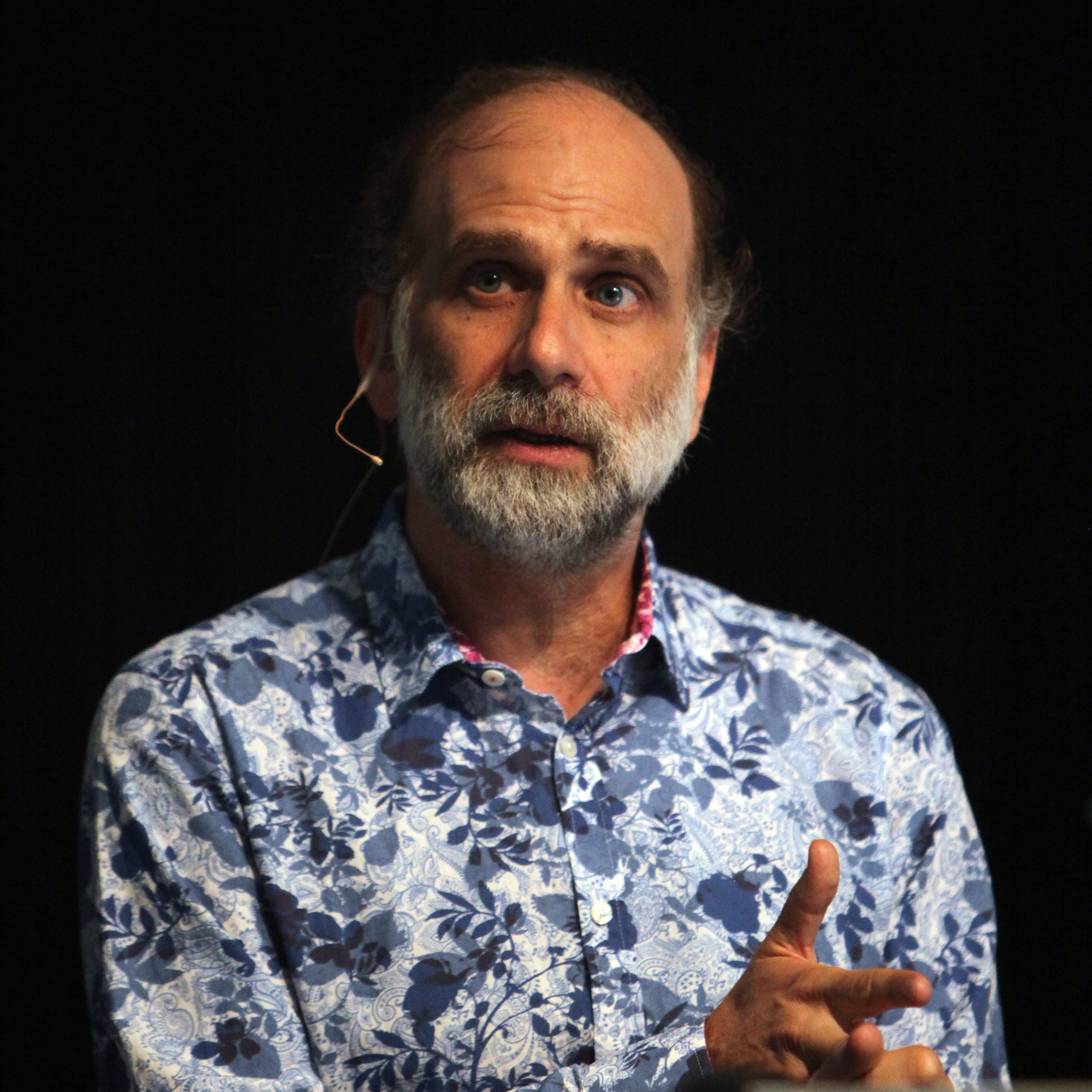
Bruce Schneier wrote about the incident in his book Schneier on Security, which was released in 2009

Gregory Bergman wrote in his 2008 book BizzWords that the devices were "essentially homemade Lite-Brites". Bergman concluded: "That this occurred in Boston, home to Harvard, MIT, and other famous schools of learning, is embarrassing." Bruce Schneier wrote in his 2009 book Schneier on Security that Boston officials were "ridiculed" for their overreaction to the incident. Schneier wrote, "Almost no one looked beyond the finger pointing and jeering to discuss exactly why the Boston authorities overreacted so badly. They overreacted because the signs were weird." "But if a weird device with blinking lights and wires turned out to be a bomb—what every movie bomb looks like—there would be inquiries and demands for resignations. It took the police two weeks to notice the Mooninite blinkies, but once they did, they overreacted because their jobs were at stake." Schneier characterized this as a form of "Cover Your Ass" security.

In his 2009 book Secret Agents, historian and communication professor Jeremy Packer discussed a phenomenon in culture called the "panic discourse" and described the incident as a "spectacular instance of this panic". Packer stated that the discovery of the lightboards prompted "a city government and media panic".

The Boston Phoenix published a 2012 retrospective and interviewed Zebbler for his thoughts on its place in history. The Boston Phoenix called the incident the "Great Mooninite Panic of 2007". The publication concluded that the city of Boston was impacted due to its government being "oblivious" to the Mooninite character from popular culture. Zebbler thought that history would not be likely to repeat itself with a similar event and surmised that marketing agencies would instead be more apt to first contact law enforcement to get permission for such an event.

Six years after the incident, WGBH published an article reflecting on law enforcement reaction. WGBH was critical of the government's response, observing: "What was the fallout from the scare? Both local and national media outlets derided Boston Law enforcement for failing to recognize a PR stunt gone wrong. Many young Bostonians felt the arrest of Zebbler and Stevens was an overreaction." The article quoted a student who pointed out the vast proportion of individuals were successfully able to determine the difference between a Lite-Brite children's toy and a bomb.

WGBH requested a reflective comment in 2013 from Zebbler, and he stated that he thought the government's overreaction was a greater symptom of the American culture during that time period. Zebbler said that he would take part in a subsequent guerilla marketing event if there was a benevolent motivation behind it.

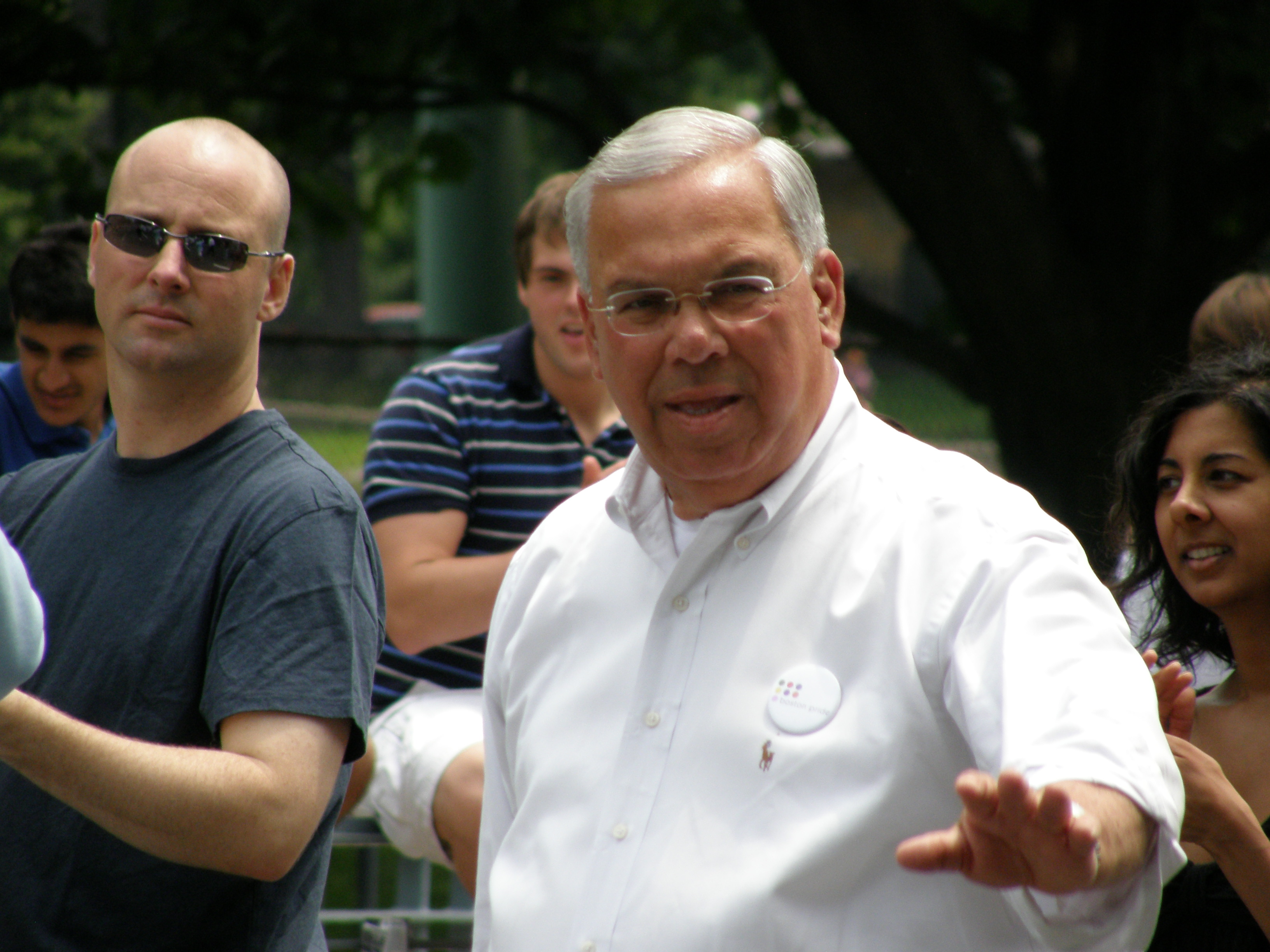
Thomas M. Menino, then-mayor of the city of Boston

The City of Boston hired Zebbler for its 2014 New Year's celebrations to create a light show, paying him $50,000 for his services. Zebbler said that it was an honor to be selected and help bring unity to the city. Zebbler's light show production was the centerpiece of the 2014 Boston First Night event held in Copley Square. When interviewed by the Boston Herald about the choice of Zebbler for the 2014 First Night, Boston Mayor Thomas M. Menino said, "We're a forgiving city." Attorney General Martha Coakley also said that paying Zebbler for the light production in 2014 was a good choice. She defended the actions of law enforcement from 2007, stating: "This was several years ago now. Those two young men had been hired by a company to do some guerrilla advertising. At the time, particularly in its proximity to 9/11, I think the City and Boston Police were very concerned. I think we responded appropriately at the time, but I think we also saw the company immediately make compensation to the City of Boston and to the Boston Police for the efforts involved."

On January 31, 2022, fifteen years after the incident, the official Adult Swim account on Twitter poked fun at the event and included an image of Ignignokt giving the middle finger with text that reads "1-31-2007 NEVER FORGET".

The 2026 Robot Chicken television special, "Robot Chicken Adult Swim 25th Anniversary Special" features a courtroom sketch where Harvey Birdman defends the Mooninites regarding the infamous 2007 Boston bomb scare.

== See also ==
- Ahmed Mohamed clock incident – Arrest of 14-year-old for disassembled clock
- Alarmism – Excessive or exaggerated alarm about a real or imagined threat
- Collective behavior – Sociological theory
- Crowd psychology – Branch of social psychology
- Herd behavior – Behavior of groups without centralized direction
- Social mania
- Boston Marathon bombing – 2013 domestic terrorist attack in Boston, Massachusetts, U.S.
- National Terrorism Advisory System – Terrorism alert warning system
- If you see something, say something – Public transportation organization in New York (post 9/11 public safety slogan)
