= Eschatone Records =

American record label

Eschatone is a New York-based record label founded in 2006 by Jed Davis, Joseph Slevin, and Lisa Brennan. With no allegiance to any genre, Eschatone releases the work of artists including Brian Dewan, The Visitors, wax.on wax.off, Michael Bassett, and several of Davis' projects, including The Hanslick Rebellion, Skyscape, and Bassett's solo work. It has also released work by Peg, Hand Habits, and The Valley Arena, as well as early-1970s Jobriath recordings.

In May 2008, the Zakka artspace in Dumbo, Brooklyn honored the label with a gallery show, The Art Of Eschatone Records, featuring album art by Dewan, Mike Allred, Michael Doret, Arturo Vega, Hatch Show Print and Angel Marcloid.

After issuing its first half-dozen releases solely on compact disc, Eschatone began pressing audiophile-grade LPs with Michael Bassett's Soft Verges.

Since then they produced several vinyl releases, plus the occasional cylinder record or 8-track tape.

== Discography ==
- The Congregation Of Vapors, "With Love From America" (CD single, 2004)
- The Hanslick Rebellion, the rebellion is here. (CD, 2005)
- Michael Bassett, puddleskinwaving (CD, 2006)
- wax.on wax.off, A Lecture On Geek Mythology (CD, 2006)
- The Visitors, The Visitors (CD, 2007)
- The Hanslick Rebellion, The Deli Of Life (CD, 2007)
- The Valley Arena, "Kick At The Ceiling" (7" vinyl, co-release with JAXART, 2007)
- Brian Dewan, Words Of Wisdom (CD, 2007)
- Michael Bassett, Soft Verges (CD/vinyl, 2008)
- The Hanslick Rebellion, Let's Get To The Fucking (digital single with T-shirt, 2008)
- Jed Davis, I Am Jed Davis! (CD, 2009)
- Skyscape, Zetacarnosa (CD, 2009)
- Jed Davis, "Yuppie Exodus From Dumbo" (cylinder record single, 2010)
- Jed Davis, The Cutting Room Floor (CD/vinyl, 2010)
- Jed Davis, Shoot The Piano Player (8-track tape, 2011)
- Jed Davis, Small Sacrifices Must Be Made! (CD, 2012)
- Jobriath, Amazing Dope Tales/Sevendys, Living in a Frame (10" vinyl split, 2013)
- Peg, Living With Abbreviation/Hand Habits, Small Shifts (10" vinyl split, 2014)
- Jobriath, As The River Flows (CD/vinyl, 2014)
