= Interference, Inc. =

American guerrilla marketing company (2001–2014)

- Industry: Marketing
- Founded: 2001
- Founder: Sam Travis Ewen
- Defunct: May 2014
- Fate: Merged into GUILD
- Headquarters: New York City, United States
- Website: interferenceinc.com

Interference, Inc. was a United States guerrilla marketing company based in New York City. Founded in 2001 by Sam Travis Ewen, Interference gained notoriety through their unconventional tactics. Clients included General Electric, Citigroup, HBO and others. They were one of the first companies to utilize unconventional media such as underwater billboards, pop-up retail stores and event/stunt based media.

The company was responsible for the 2007 Boston Mooninite panic that occurred in Boston in January 2007. CEO Sam Travis Ewen addressed the event in the June issue of Inc. Magazine.

The company, along with The Supertouch Group (also run by Ewen), announced it would merge into advertising collective GUILD in May 2014.

== Aqua Teen Hunger Force controversy in Boston ==
On January 31, 2007, several guerrilla-marketing magnetic light displays in and around the city of Boston, Massachusetts were mistaken for possible explosive devices. Several subway stations, bridges, and a portion of Interstate 93 were closed as police examined, removed, and in some cases, destroyed the devices. The suspicious objects were revealed not to be bombs but ads depicting the Mooninites, Ignignokt and Err, characters from Adult Swim's animated television series Aqua Teen Hunger Force.
