= Zebbler =

American artist (born 1979)

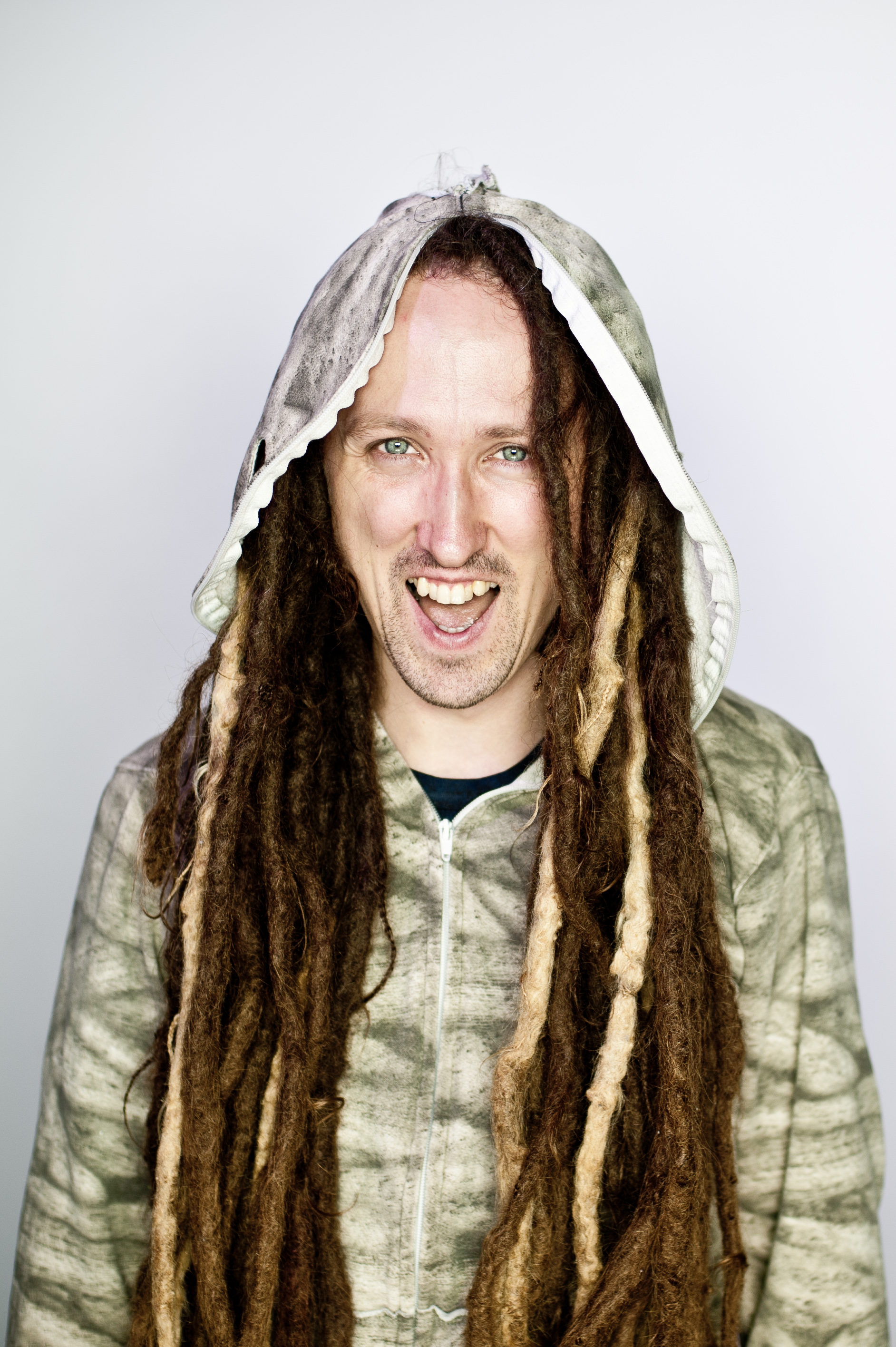
- Zebbler in 2012
- Born: Peter Berdovsky; 1979 (age 46–47); Grodno, Belarus
- Education: Massachusetts College of Art and Design
- Occupations: Visual artist, video jockey
- Known for: 2007 Boston Mooninite panic
- Website: https://zebblerstudios.com/

Peter Berdovsky, better known as Zebbler is a visual artist, video jockey and the founder of Zebbler Studios, who is known for his work with Shpongle, EOTO, and Zebbler Encanti Experience. Zebbler first gained worldwide fame for the 2007 Boston Mooninite panic on January 31, 2007, and subsequent news conference. His first "Shpongletron" design earned him recognition as one of the first VJs to incorporate 3D video mapping into his set designs.

== Early life ==
Originally from Grodno, Belarus, Berdovsky graduated from Arlington High School in Arlington, Massachusetts in 1999 before completing a degree at Massachusetts College of Art and Design in 2006. Growing up, young Berdovsky always had music in his house thanks to his mother who was a music teacher. He quickly got used to being surrounded by balalaikas, drums, cymbals, shakers, pianos, accordions, and bayans as well as the sounds of Abba and the best of 1980s Russian pop blasting on his mum's vinyl record player. His artistic persona is not only a way to honor his roots but also the result of a revelation involving the actor Sean Connery. "When I was 13, I decided that I needed a pseudonym. While daydreaming, a visualization of a dragon with the distinct voice of Connery appeared in front of me and said, with a thick Scottish accent, ‘Frae noo oan, son, yer nam shaa be knoon as Zebbler!’ So I took up my foreign-sounding name and embraced it as my own," he recalls.

== Boston Mooninite panic ==
The Boston bomb scare, a.k.a. "The Mooninite Incident", occurred on January 31, 2007. During this incident, also dubbed "Boston Mission 1" and "Boston Mission 2", Zebbler and Sean Stevens put up close to 40 battery powered LED Ignignokt shaped signs around the city of Boston as "subvertising" for the upcoming Aqua Teen Hunger Force Colon Movie Film for Theaters. However, Boston police found the signs to have similar characteristics to improvised explosive devices. These characteristics included a circuit board, power source, exposed wiring, and electrical tape. The police responded by sending in a large amount of emergency vehicles, including the Boston Police Department bomb squad. The event cost the parent company, Turner Broadcasting System, along with Interference Inc., $2 million. One million went to the Boston police department, while the other million went to Department of Homeland Security. As a result, the head of Cartoon Network resigned.

== Shpongletron ==
The Shpongletron, designed by Zebbler for Shpongle's 2011 US Tour, consists of a DJ booth for Shpongle, surrounded by custom screens and surfaces that have video mapped images projected onto them. On the bottom of the audiovisual installation, also dubbed "The Shpongletron Experience", are three white painted scaffolding cubes that are covered by translucent screen. The six foot Shpongle Mask is also a 3-D projection surface, along with wings and an eye that are both covered in projection material. The custom welded eye also has an embedded laser. In 2014, Zebbler designed the critically acclaimed Shpongletron 3, which embedded the new touring structure with pixel mapped LEDs and infinity mirrors.

== EOTO ==
Zebbler began touring with EOTO in 2011 during which he used custom Fourier analysis of EOTO's live sounds to trigger pre-made visual events. Closed circuit cameras, along with user submitted visuals, were also used. The same custom-made software (Zebblertron) was used during this tour as was used with the Shongletron Experience. Zebbler rejoined touring with EOTO for their 2012 Base Invaders Tour, where he debuted a 3-D video mapped lotus flower surrounding the stage.

== Zebbler Encanti Experience ==
Z.E.E. is a collaboration between Zebbler and electronic music producer Encanti. The duo provide a multi-media experience, with Zebbler performing live visuals to Encanti's glitchy, bass heavy beats and interspersed vocals. Using the custom software "Zebblertron", the duo perform live with light and sound through triggered events and improvisation. Z.E.E. accompanied EOTO on their 2012 Time Illusion Tour. In January 2014, Z.E.E. released "Altered Projections", which featured tracks that had been remixed from their previous album "Psychic Projections." Z.E.E. released their third album, "Freakquency", in July the same year that was well received by critics followed by a national tour that promoted the release of their album The album featured vocals from two artists, one of which was Indian vocalist Ganavya, who joined the group in select concerts. Z.E.E.'s 2015 summer boat festival was listed by WBUR as one of the top 10 Boston area music festivals. In 2017, the group was featured by Bullet Music with an in depth interview moving through themes about objective reality, machine intelligence, emotion, imagination and creative freedom . In 2019, Z.E.E. released a new four track EP on the independent label Wakaan and released their music video "Trance End" just a few months later.

== First Night Boston ==
In 2013, 6 years after the Mooninite incident, the city of Boston's New Year's Eve celebration, First Night Boston, hired Zebbler to create an electric light show as the centerpiece of the event in Copley Square. “We’re a forgiving city,” Mayor Menino told The Boston Herald. “That’s 2007. This is 2013.”

== Berklee College of Music ==
The electronic production division of Berklee College of Music invited Zebbler to teach in January 2018. Leading his approach with a hands-on active classroom, Zebbler encourages his students to learn through experimentation and believes that the "best way to learn something is to both hear how something works and try to do it yourself. It is through this repetition of doing that artistic styles and perfection of craft appear." Positioned between the worlds of music and visual arts, his diverse and comprehensive experiences offers his students his enthusiasm to these cultural worlds and the rigorous world of VJ performance.

Founding director, Stephen Webber, of Berklee's Music Production, Technology, and Innovation program sought to introduce modern multimedia performance to the students and in 2017, Zebber joined as an instructor in their campus in Valencia, Spain, teaching video production and VJ/video mapping classes, where students experiment with software and hardware like Adobe Premiere, After Effects, SketchUp, Resolume Arena, Photoshop, Ableton Live, DSLR cameras, video projectors, and MIDI network sync and a/v performance strategies.

== Aston Martin x Tom Brady ==
Zebbler Studios provided an interactive ten-channel surround video display for an Aston Martin ad which unveiled a $360,000 signature edition Vanquish S Volante Tom Brady convertible. Featuring New England Patriots quarterback Tom Brady and Aston Martin's design chief Marek Reichman, the ad incorporated thematic live video projections accompanied by live text, echoing key phrases from the conversation between Marek and Tom.

== Envision Festival ==
Working with festivals to design visuals and lighting installations led to the production of massive stage builds for Envision Festival's Sol Stage in Uvita, Costa Rica. Beginning in 2016, and consecutively until 2019, Zebbler Studios, LLC, has created experiential pieces on stages that host multi sensory performances for festival guests on a remote coastline between the Costa Rican jungle and the ocean. Spanning over 100 feet in length, the stage sets are entirely video mapped with 3D-animated content, live video inputs, and live effects, providing a rich and saturated visual counterpart to a variety of live bands and electronic musicians.

== Notable performances ==
Zebbler has displayed his custom mapped video installations and live image "mashups" at multiple art museums/spaces, festivals, and conventions:

- ReMixer Zebbler Performance, Berkeley Museum of Art, Berkeley, California (custom HD Video-surround sound performance), October 26, 2007
- Official VJ for RedBull North America, 2007–2008
- Global Groove, Lawrence Hall of Science, Berkeley, California (custom 3 screen a/v performance), May 9, 2008
- COSM New Year's Eve celebration (Alex Grey's Art Sanctuary), New York – custom HD VJ installation, a/v performance with Z.E.E., December 31, 2009
- Ultra Music Festival, Miami, Florida (Featured VJ performer), March 27–28, 2009
- Anime Convention 2009, Hynes Convention Center, Boston, Massachusetts (ZEE a/v performance), May 23, 2009
- Hansel and Gretel RE:Imagined (official VJ showcase of the Together festival), Pozen Center, Boston, Massachusetts – event curator/promoter, custom HD video installation and a/v performance with Z.E.E. and Clever Girl, February 13, 2010
- DEF CON, Las Vegas, Nevada (custom video mapped dragon installation, deco work), 2011–present

== Awards and distinctions ==
- Best Boston Artist of 2007 – The Improper Bostonian
- #12 VJ in the World – 2007 DJ Magazine
- Best Local Visual Artist of 2009 – The Boston Phoenix
