= Social mania =

Mass movements sweeping through societies

Social manias are mass movements which periodically sweep through societies. They are characterized by an outpouring of enthusiasm, mass involvement and millenarian goals. They are contagious social epidemics, and as such they should be differentiated from mania in individuals.

Social manias come in different sizes and strengths. Some fail to 'catch fire', while others persist for centuries (although sometimes in severely attenuated form).

== Examples ==
The Taiping Rebellion is an excellent illustration, as it was both widespread and destructive and has no modern adherents to whom its use as an example would be a distraction. The Ghost dance which was briefly embraced by Native Americans of the Great Plains in 1890 may be viewed as an example with a historical perspective, as may The Crusades.

== See also ==
- Moral panic
- Social panic
- Mass psychogenic illness
