= JAXART Records =

Record label

- Founded: 2007
- Founder: Ashley Jex
- Country of origin: United States
- Location: Los Angeles, California
- Official website: www.jaxart.net

JAXART Records is a Southern California based record label founded in 2007 by Ashley Jex of the MP3 blog Rock Insider. The label began releasing vinyl and digital albums for artists from Southern California and beyond.

JAXART Records has since released vinyl singles for artist such as Mezzanine Owls, The Henry Clay People, The Parson Red Heads, RACES, Steffaloo, Sevendys, Polls, and more. In 2012 JAXART would release the debut full length from Southern California DIY band So Many Wizards – performers at The Smell and pehrspace music venues.
