= Hatch Show Print =

American print shop

- Founded: 1879
- Founder: Charles Hatch; Herbert Hatch
- Headquarters: Nashville, Tennessee
- Services: Letter press printing
- Website: hatchshowprint.com

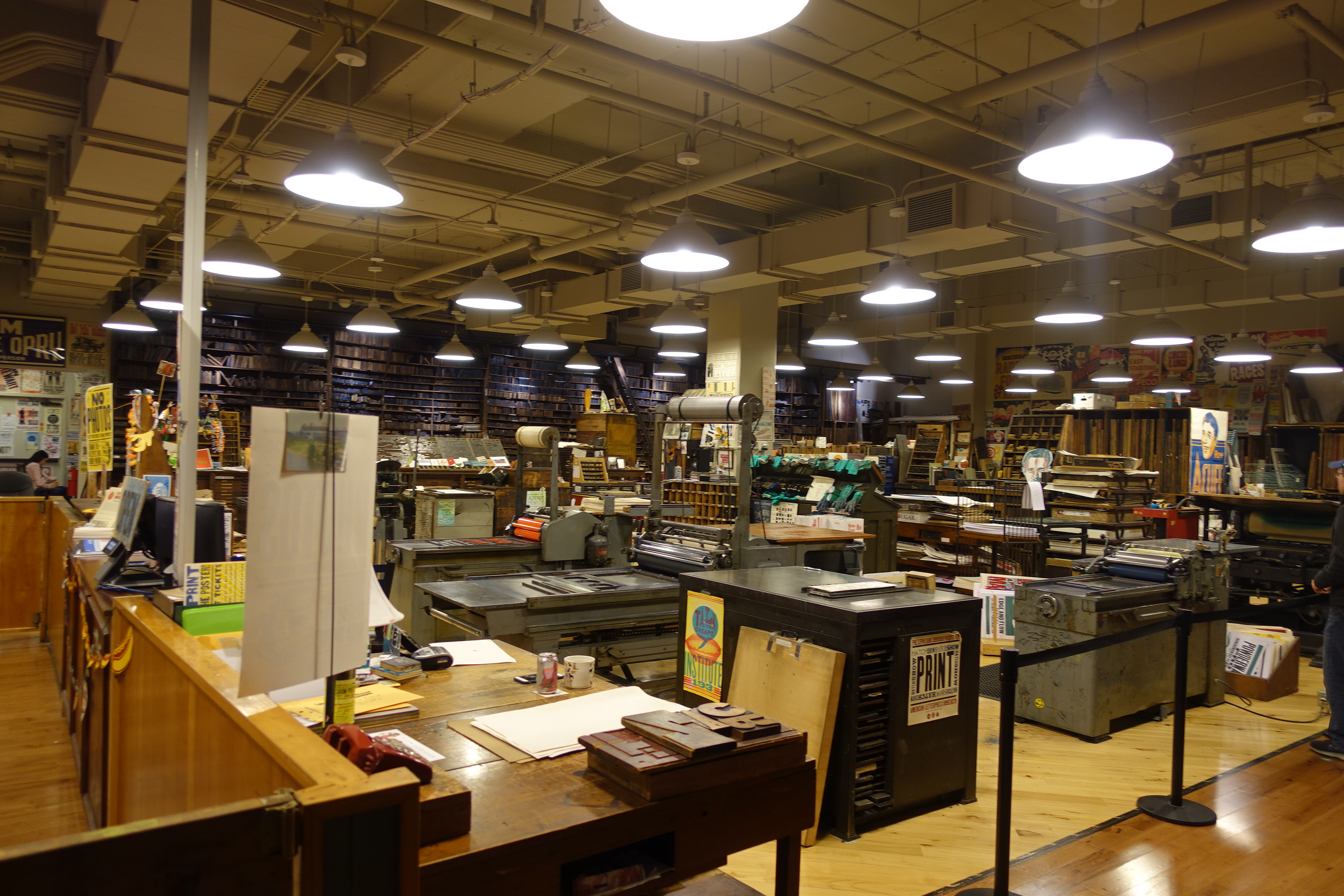
Interior photograph, 2013

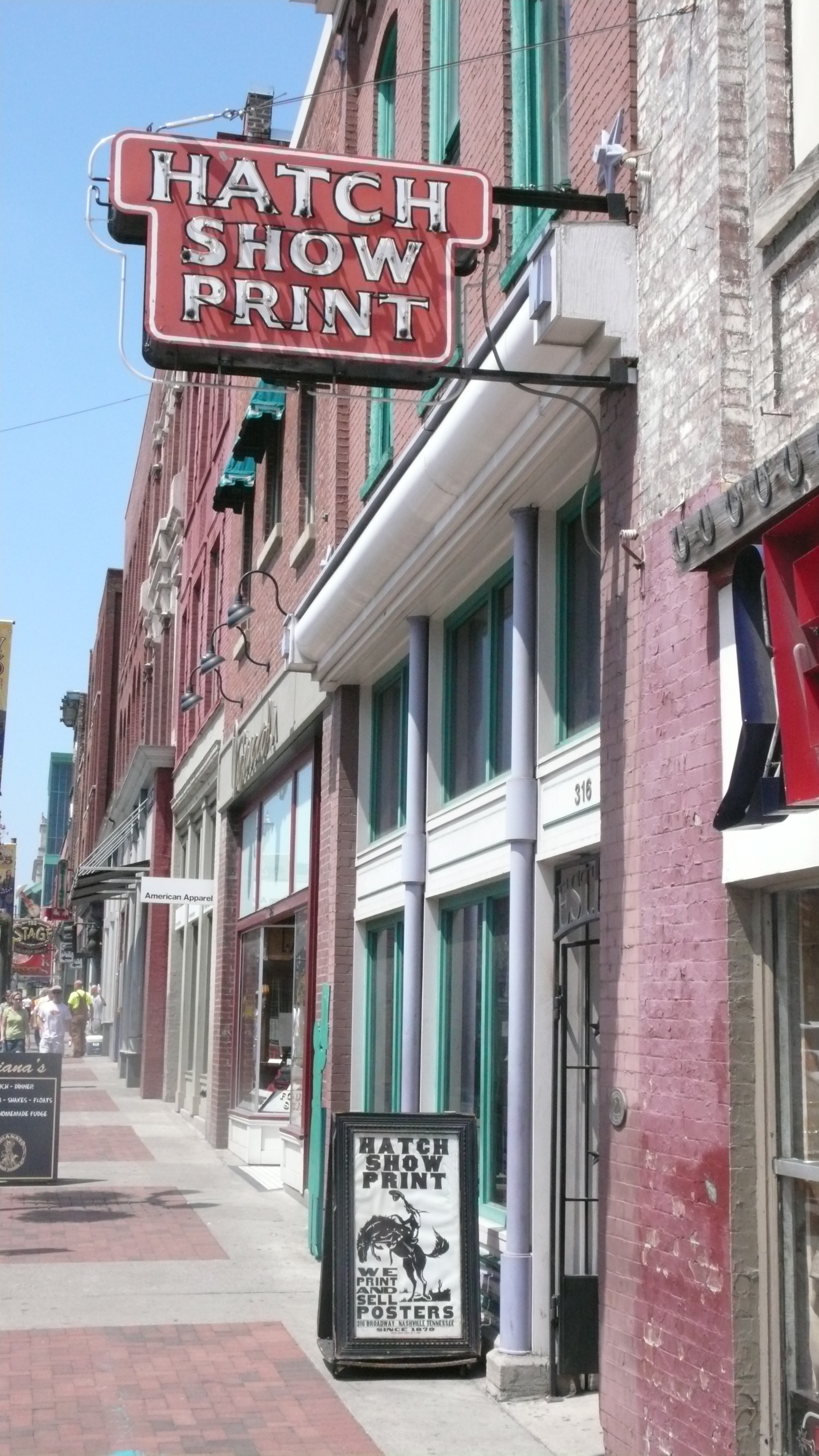
External view, 1992-2010 premises

Hatch Show Print is a print shop in Nashville, United States that specializes in printing concert posters using letter press printing and hand-carved wood pieces.

Founded in 1879 by Charles and Herbert Hatch, it is known for its use of vintage wood type. William Hatch, Charles' son, took over the shop in the 1920s.

Hatch Show Print offers tours to the public and offers educational programs.

== History ==
The Hatch brothers, known as CR and HH, founded Hatch Show Print in 1879. The first handbill they made was for Harriet Beecher Stowe’s brother, Rev. Henry Ward Beecher.

In the mid 1920s, Charles Hatch's son, Will Hatch took over the business. Will hand carve the lettering that was used.

From 1925 until 1992 Hatch was located behind Ryman Auditorium, which allowed for the company to begin making posters for country music singers such as, Patsy Cline, Willie Nelson, Bill Monroe, Minnie Pearl, Loretta Lynn, and more.

In 1984, Jim Sherraden took over as manager.

The brand was donated by Gaylord Entertainment in 1992 to the Country Music Hall of Fame and Museum and in 2013 Hatch Show Print moved inside the museum.

In 2019, Hatch designed 32 posters for NFL teams for the NFL draft and in the same month celebrated their 140th anniversary.

In February 2024, art from Hatch was displayed in an exhibit at The Cape Girardeau Country History Center in Jackson, Missouri.

In April 2024, Hatch celebrated its 145th anniversary.
