= Aqua Teen Hunger Force season 7 =

Aqua Teen Hunger Force
- Season 7
- Volume Seven DVD cover (left), which features episode 1–5 from season seven. Episodes 6–12 were released on the Aqua Unit Patrol Squad 1: Season 1 set (right).
- Starring: Dana Snyder; Carey Means; Dave Willis
- No. of episodes: 12

Release
- Original network: Adult Swim
- Original release: December 13, 2009 – May 2, 2010

Season chronology
- ← Previous; Season 6 Next → Season 8

The seventh season of the animated television series, Aqua Teen Hunger Force originally aired in the United States on Cartoon Network's late night programming block, Adult Swim. Season seven started with special episode "A PE Christmas" on December 13, 2009, officially began with "Rabbot Redux" on February 7, 2010, and ended on May 2, 2010, with "One Hundred", with a total of twelve episodes. Aqua Teen Hunger Force is about the surreal adventures and antics of three anthropomorphic fast food items: Master Shake, Frylock, and Meatwad, who live together as roommates and frequently interact with their human next-door neighbor, Carl in a suburban neighborhood in South New Jersey. In May 2015, this season became available on Hulu Plus.

Season seven is notable for being the final season of the original run of the series to premiere as an Aqua Teen Hunger Force season, as the series started using alternative titles from 2011 to 2015. Episodes in season seven were written and directed by Dave Willis and Matt Maiellaro. Almost every episode in this season features a special guest appearance, which continues a practice used in past seasons. This season has been made available on DVD, and other forms of home media, including on demand streaming.

== Production ==
Every episode in this season was written and directed by series creators Dave Willis and Matt Maiellaro, who have both written and directed every episode of the series. All episodes originally aired in the United States on Cartoon Network's late night programming block, Adult Swim. This is the final season branded under the Aqua Teen Hunger Force title before Willis and Maiellaro started using a different alternative title for each season in 2011. As with most seasons, several episodes originally aired outside of their production order.

Season seven officially began with "Rabbot Redux" on February 7, 2010. "Rabbot Redux" is the conclusion of the season six finale, "Last Last One Forever and Ever", and features multiple references to the series' first episode, "Rabbot" and many other episodes as well. "Rabbot Redux" also featured a new intro and credits song, which was only used for that episode, performed by Schoolly D. "Rabbot Redux" marks Schoolly D's first appearance on Aqua Teen Hunger Force since season one, as well as Rabbot's first appearance since "The Last One".

Season seven also features the series' 100th episode, "One Hundred". The episode marks Dr Weird's first appearance since Aqua Teen Hunger Force Colon Movie Film for Theaters, as well as Handbanana's second appearance.

== Cast ==
=== Main ===
- Dana Snyder as Master Shake
- Carey Means as Frylock
- Dave Willis as Meatwad and Carl

=== Recurring ===
- Matt Maiellaro as Cybernetic Ghost of Christmas Past from the Future
- George Lowe as an attorney, a policeman, a pinball machine repairman

=== Guest appearances ===
- Don Kennedy as Lance in "Rubberman"
- Justin Roiland ("Rustin Joyland" is listed in the credits) as the red cat in the top hat in "Rabbot"
- Todd Barry as the birds in "Eggball".
- Michael Kohler as himself in "A PE Christmas"
- Chuck D as himself in "A PE Christmas"
- Larry Miller as himself in "Larry Miller Hair System
- Gillian Jacobs as Carl's wife in "Larry Miller Hair System
- Bill Hader as the pod in "IAMAPOD"
- Chickenfoot as themselves in "IAMAPOD"
- Craig Hartin as Phil Samson in"Hands On a Hamburger"
- Paul F. Tompkins as the angel of the man "Juggalo"
- Insane Clown Posse as themselves in "Juggalo"
- Brooks Braselman played the main role of the ghost, as well its clones, in "Kangarilla and the Magic Tarantula"
- Robert Smigel as One Hundred in "One Hundred"
- Nick Weidenfeld voiced a television executive in "One Hundred"
- Tom Savini as an unnamed cop in "One Hundred"
- Amber Nash as Master Shake's girlfriend Tabitha during "The Bayou Boo-Ya" segment in "One Hundred"

== Broadcast history ==
Season seven features "A PE Christmas", the first Aqua Teen Hunger Force Christmas episode since the season three episode, "T-Shirt of the Living Dead". "A PE Christmas" originally aired off-season as a Christmas special only twice on December 13, 2009. The episode was never rebroadcast again until it made its official premiere on March 14, 2010, where it aired as the fifth episode of the season in the television order. The official premiere featured the full ending that was not featured on either of the December 13, 2009 airings. The full ending has been featured in reruns of the episode ever since the March 14, 2010 debut.

== Episodes ==
No. overall	No. in season	Title	Directed by	Written by	Original release date	Prod. code
89	1	"A PE Christmas"	Dave Willis & Matt Maiellaro	Dave Willis & Matt Maiellaro	December 13, 2009	701
The day before Christmas, Master Shake nearly embarrasses the Aqua Teens at church with his crude behavior. Back home, Frylock announces that the year has been rough and they won't receive as much presents as expected. Shake says that he had some sort of epiphany during the service, and decides to do things "differently." Having stolen the identities of Flavor Flav and Chuck D, he plans to make and release an album under their names for the holiday season. With Meatwad on his side and Frylock dismissing from the plan, the duo try to record the songs before Christmas, which naturally doesn't work out. Guest appearances: Michael Kohler and Chuck D. Note: Many minor characters from previous episodes, including an animated version of Dave Willis can be seen in the church scene, in the beginning of this episode. This is the third Aqua Teen Hunger Force Christmas episode.
90	2	"Rabbot Redux"	Dave Willis & Matt Maiellaro	Dave Willis & Mattimorph Maiellarodyne	February 7, 2010	702
The episode starts where "Last Last One Forever and Ever" left off, with the Aqua Teens moving into a new house on the other side of Carl's house to start a new life, much to Carl's dismay. The Rabbot makes a brief appearance in the end. In general, this episode is what the title says it to be; a rehashing of the original pilot episode, as some of the original dialogue is used here, with major tweaks. Notes: This is the first episode to have a new theme song; the original theme song was subsequently reinstated after this episode. Schoolly D appears as himself.
91	3	"Rubberman"	Dave Willis & Matt Maiellaro	Dave Willis & Matt Maiellaro	February 14, 2010	703
Carl starts raking used condoms on the Aqua Teens' yard, which gives Frylock the idea to make a duck out of the used condoms to promote safe sex. Meatwad puts Carl's lamp on the duck to bring him to life, despite Frylock's protest against his wish. He names him Lance and the two bond well, only for their friendship to quickly turn dark when Lance has Meatwad help him commit various crimes. Guest appearances: Don Kennedy as Rubberman
92	4	"Eggball"	Dave Willis & Matt Maiellaro	Dave Willis & Matt Maiellaro	February 21, 2010	704
Master Shake builds a pinball machine designed after himself. He runs out of pinballs, and the Aqua Teens travel to Death Island to collect pinball eggs from a flightless bird he met a short while ago. Guest appearance: Todd Barry as the birds
93	5	"Monster"	Dave Willis & Matt Maiellaro	Dave Willis & Matt Maiellaro	February 28, 2010	705
Meatwad believes there's a monster in his closet. Scared, he refuses to sleep in his own room by any means necessary, going as far as stealing Frylock's credit card to stay in a high class hotel and spending enormously in the process. Not willing to put up with the trouble, Frylock does everything he can, including a team-up with Carl, to convince Meatwad that there is no monster in his closet, while Shake tries to shoehorn himself into the situation just to take advantage of whatever he wants..
94	6	"Hands On a Hamburger"	Dave Willis & Matt Maiellaro	Dave Willis & Matt Maiellaro	March 21, 2010	706
The Aqua Teens compete in a contest at a suspiciously-familiar burger chain, unaware that they are pawns in Dr. Wongburger's latest scheme. Guest appearance: Phil Samson as himself.
95	7	"IAMAPOD"	Dave Willis & Matt Maiellaro	Dave Willis & Matt Maiellaro	March 28, 2010	707
A pod attempts to replicate Master Shake and then follow Chickenfoot on the road. Guest appearances: Chickenfoot and Bill Hader as the Pod.
96	8	"Juggalo"	Dave Willis & Matt Maiellaro	Dave Willis & Matt Maiellaro	April 4, 2010	708
Master Shake kills somebody (with the help of Meatwad) in the process of creating a diversion so that he can streak nude through town. He shows up as a vengeful angel who makes Shake change his ways by temporarily sending him to hell as a threat unless he obeys to perform good deeds. Annoyed, Shake turns to an Insane Clown Posse fan, whom he believes holds the powers of darkness to rid him of his angel. Guest appearances: Insane Clown Posse and Paul F. Tompkins as the angel
97	9	"Multiple Meat"	Dave Willis & Matt Maiellaro	Dave Willis & Matt Maiellaro	April 11, 2010	709
Master Shake is in the back yard of his house using a sword to cut Meatwad in half. After Meatwad was cut into two pieces, both pieces get up and both have the same personality as Meatwad, and the two start talking. Later in Frylock's room, Frylock explains to Shake that every time Meatwad is cut up he will multiply, like a worm. The two halves of Meatwad both attempt to enter the house, after realizing they both can't fit in at once, they both get into a long discussion, which lasts several months, on who should go first, until Frylock eventually tricks them both into coming inside. Soon after, Shake cuts Meatwad up seven more times, thus creating a total of eight Meatwads. Carl later attempts to scam the eight different Meatwads in a game of Texas hold 'em, by playing with flashcards. Carl wins the game but storms out of the room threatening revenge from his cousin, when he found out he was only playing for play money, a backscratcher, and two of Meatwad's dolls. Master Shake then continues to cut up Meatwad, till the point were there is enough Meatwads to fill up the entire living room, all of which attempt to form a group. After seeing this Frylock decides to leave home, after telling the Meatwads to sing "3 million bottles of beer on the wall", which they can not sing correctly, which annoys Master Shake. 27 Years Later after leaving Master Shake and the Meatwads alone, Frylock returns to give Master Shake to give him a bug bomb, where he finds the house is in ruins, Master Shake has punctured his eyes and ears out, and the Meatwads still sing the same song incorrectly. Frylock tells Master Shake that after leaving home he wrote a successful book, which turned into a franchise of movies, television shows, and series of self-help discs; and that he also married Cheryl Tiegs, then her grand daughter, then explains he also bought a small island and the New York Giants. The Meatwads finally finish the song, and soon start over, which leads to Master Shake's off screen gunshot suicide. The episode ends with Frylock leaving the house in a white limousine.
98	10	"Kangarilla and the Magic Tarantula"	Dave Willis & Matt Maiellaro	Dave Willis & Matt Maiellaro	April 18, 2010	710
Frylock is with Meatwad, in Carl's back yard, Meatwad is doing the backstroke in Carl's pool, and trying to get Frylock's attention by doing so. Frylock has been playing a game on his cell phone the whole time. Meatwad starts drowning, which Frylock ignores, Meatwad eventually gets out of the pool, and starts yelling at Frylock ignoring him. Meatwad then tries to get Frylock's attention by calling him, which Frylock ignores. After this attempt Master Shake comes over to criticize Frylock for ignoring Meatwad. Master Shake then notices Frylock's game and starts watching him play. Master Shake tries to play the game, but messes up, forcing Frylock to start over, meanwhile Meatwad the notices a series of floating objects, after Meatwad tells Master Shake and Frylock about this, and they continue to ignore him, and play the game. Hours later Master Shake and Frylock are still outside playing the game, until the battery wears, out, and the two go inside, and plug it in. Inside the house, once again, Meatwad is trying to the Master Shake's and Frylock's attention, by wearing shoes, and pointing out a series of floating objects in the house, which they continue to ignore. Soon after, blood writes "Smiley Junction" on the wall, and a series of plates break, doors slam, and objects fly around, which Master Shake and Frylock still ignore. Then blood starts flowing from Frylock's phone, which they do not notice, and then a mouth appears on the phone, and bites Shake's fingers, which he blames on sticky buttons, and soon forgets about it, and continues to play. Soon after a ghost appears, asking Meatwad to get Shake and Frylock's attention, Meatwad tells him that he often threatens suicide, for attention. Meatwad then tells Shake and Frylock that he's going to kill himself, and pulls out a gun, which they ignore, and then goes on to shoot himself three times in the head, which doesn't hurt him, and Frylock and Shake continue to ignore him. Meatwad then tells the ghost to blow up the house, which destroys the phone, and effectively get Shake and Frylock's attention. Outside Frylock finally meets the ghost. The ghost tells Frylock's he's from Smiley Junction, Meatwad then asks what Smiley Junction is. Frylock then explains that Smiley Junction was an old community, which was accidentally bombed, then block off from the rest of the world, which led to the deaths of all the residents. The ghost then explains to Frylock, that he was in their house to get away from cell phone signals, which kill ghosts. The ghost also tells Frylock he just wanted pizza and Chinese take-out, but could not order any. The ghost then tells Frylock to organize a benefit, with Meat Loaf, to put an end to cell phones, Frylock suggests that the ghost open his own pizza place to solve his problem, the ghost decides to go with the idea. Meatwad then asks about his Meat Loaf concert idea, which Carl overhears. Carl then tells Master Shake, Frylock, Meatwad, and the ghost, about the time his second cousin, Denese, gave Meat Loaf a handjob. Carl then pulls out his cell phone to call Denese to tell the story, while the signals from his phone kills the ghost. On the phone Carl starts arguing with Denese, while the ghost of the ghost shows, up and is instantly dies, from the cell phone signals. Shake and Meatwad then demand that Carl gives them the phone, while he's arguing with Denese. Another ghost shows up, and dies, Carl calls Denese back, while another ghost shows up and dies. The episode ends with Meatwad killing ghosts with a cell phone, while Shake and Frylock watch. Guest appearance: Brooks Braselman as the ghosts.
99	11	"Larry Miller Hair System"	Dave Willis & Matt Maiellaro	Dave Willis & Matt Maiellaro	April 25, 2010	711
Larry Miller shows Carl what his life would be like if he had a full head of hair so Carl would buy the Larry Miller Hair System for Men. Later on Larry leaves to gamble, while Carl decides to ruin the Hair Carl's life. It works so well that the Hair Carl kills himself. After that Larry returns to give Carl the system which Frylock thinks is affecting him. The Cybernetic Ghost of Christmas Past from the Future thinks Carl is a robot, but one of his robots points out that only his hair is metal. At the end, the Cybernetic Ghost enters a fake time chamber which ruins his plans. Guest appearances: Larry Miller as himself and Gillian Jacobs as Carl's wife.
100	12	"One Hundred"	Dave Willis & Matt Maiellaro	Dave Willis, Comedian Matt "Craig Hartin Fan Club" Maiellaro, Mike Geier & Chris Ward	May 2, 2010	712
The 100th episode. Frylock becomes obsessed with the number 100, which keeps appearing everywhere, partly because he's written it on the walls, floors, and furniture. Neither Meatwad nor Shake believes his theory. They think he's just being paranoid. Frylock explains that the number 100 was invented by the ancient Mayans. During a flashback to Mayan times, a monster appears to say something about the 100th episode of Aqua Teen Hunger Force. Only Shake understands what this means, however, which is that Aqua Teen Hunger Force has hit "the magic number for syndication cash." Neither Frylock nor Meatwad is aware that this is all just a television show. Hoping to "cash in" on 8 years of TV work, Shake hops a plane to Century City, California, where he meets with some network executives in a boardroom. Actor Dana Snyder pops out of his Master Shake costume, complaining that he's been underpaid for years and that a kitty litter commercial was more lucrative than Aqua Teen Hunger Force. A network executive explains that because Aqua Teen Hunger Force is only eleven minutes long, they technically only have fifty half-hours, so syndication will have to wait. Snyder/Shake storms out of the boardroom, vowing to have another 50 episodes done in 8 more years. The second half is a parody of Scooby-Doo. Guest appearances: Tom Savini as policemen and Robert Smigel as One Hundred.

== Reception ==
Ramsey Isler of IGN gave "Rubberman" an 8 out of 10, which is considered "Great" comparing the episode to a Horror Show, but also saying it was entertaining to watch. "Eggball" was given a 6.3 out of 10 which is considered "Okay", by Isler who thought the pinball themed episode had real potential but gave it a negative review calling it a "dud" and an incoherent mess and followed it up with "ATHF—it's always going to be random, and it's always going to be hit or miss". Isler appreciated "Multiple Meats" for being Meatwad centric and for not using dark humor or shock value comedy during the majority of the episode and ultimately gave the episode a 7.8 out of 10, which is considered "Good". Isler gave "Moster" a generally positive review but gave the ending some criticism for not being "as strong as it could have been" and ultimate gave the episode an 8.6 which is considered "Great". "Rabbot Redux" was given a 7 which is considered "Good" by Isler who found to be random, and gave the episode a neutral review, and claimed it was better than the Super Bowl XLIV half time show, which had aired earlier that night on CBS. Jonah Krakow of IGN, who reviewed the sneak peek version of "A PE Christmas" that aired on December 13, 2009, gave the episode an 8.5 which is considered "Great", he called it a good come back for the series after "Last Last One Forever and Ever" and compared it to several other Adult Swim Christmas specials that aired that month.

== Home release ==
Five episodes from season seven were released on the Aqua Teen Hunger Force Volume Seven DVD set in Region 1 on June 1, 2010, along with six episodes from season six. The remaining episodes were released on the Aqua Unit Patrol Squad 1: Season 1 DVD set on October 11, 2011, along with the entire eighth season. Both sets were released by Adult Swim and distributed by Warner Home Video. Both sets feature completely uncensored audio, with Volume Seven marking the first time episodes were released uncensored. Both sets also feature special features. Both sets were later released in Region 4 by Madman Entertainment on June 16, 2010 and November 30, 2011 respectively.

This season was also released under the label "Season 8" in HD and SD on iTunes, the Xbox Live Marketplace, and Amazon Video under the label "Volume 8".

Aqua Teen Hunger Force Volume Seven
Set details			Special features
11 episodes; 2-disc set; 16:9 aspect ratio; Languages: English			Live Action Behind the Scenes: The Making of 12 Minutes of Television That Changed Television for 12 Minutes; Rubberman Behind the Scenes: Our Mom and Uncle Sing About Condoms; Dumb Down Your Smartphone; Terror Phone II: The Legend of Rakenstein; Live Action Carl: The Dave Long Story: Shave Your Head, Grow a Mustache and Gain 80 lbs for a Shot at Fame
Release dates			Live Action Behind the Scenes: The Making of 12 Minutes of Television That Changed Television for 12 Minutes; Rubberman Behind the Scenes: Our Mom and Uncle Sing About Condoms; Dumb Down Your Smartphone; Terror Phone II: The Legend of Rakenstein; Live Action Carl: The Dave Long Story: Shave Your Head, Grow a Mustache and Gain 80 lbs for a Shot at Fame
Region 1	Region 2	Region 4	Live Action Behind the Scenes: The Making of 12 Minutes of Television That Changed Television for 12 Minutes; Rubberman Behind the Scenes: Our Mom and Uncle Sing About Condoms; Dumb Down Your Smartphone; Terror Phone II: The Legend of Rakenstein; Live Action Carl: The Dave Long Story: Shave Your Head, Grow a Mustache and Gain 80 lbs for a Shot at Fame
June 1, 2010	—N/a	June 16, 2010	Live Action Behind the Scenes: The Making of 12 Minutes of Television That Changed Television for 12 Minutes; Rubberman Behind the Scenes: Our Mom and Uncle Sing About Condoms; Dumb Down Your Smartphone; Terror Phone II: The Legend of Rakenstein; Live Action Carl: The Dave Long Story: Shave Your Head, Grow a Mustache and Gain 80 lbs for a Shot at Fame

Aqua Unit Patrol Squad 1: Season 1
Set details			Special features
17 episodes; 2-disc set; 16:9 aspect ratio; Languages: English			Terror Phone 3
Release dates			Terror Phone 3
Region 1	Region 2	Region 4	Terror Phone 3
October 11, 2011	—N/a	November 30, 2011	Terror Phone 3

== See also ==
- "One Hundred"
- List of Aqua Teen Hunger Force episodes
- Aqua Teen Hunger Force
