= Aqua Teen Hunger Force season 9 =

Aqua Teen Hunger Force
- Season 9
- The Aqua Something You Know Whatever title card used throughout the ninth season.
- Starring: Dana Snyder; Carey Means; Dave Willis
- No. of episodes: 10

Release
- Original network: Adult Swim
- Original release: June 24 – August 26, 2012

Season chronology
- ← Previous; Season 8 Next → Season 10

The ninth season of the animated television series Aqua Teen Hunger Force, alternatively titled Aqua Something You Know Whatever (or ASYKW), originally aired in the United States on Adult Swim. This season had a total of ten episodes, premiering with "Big Bro" on June 24, 2012 and ending with "Totem Pole" on August 26, 2012. The show is about the surreal adventures and antics of three anthropomorphic fast food items: Master Shake, Frylock, and Meatwad, who live together as roommates and frequently interact with their human next-door neighbor, Carl in a suburban neighborhood Seattle, New Jersey, a fictional location which is completely identical to their other previous homes seen in past seasons. In May 2015, this season became available on Hulu Plus, and in May 2020, it became available on HBO Max.

Episodes in this season were written and directed by Dave Willis and Matt Maiellaro. Almost every episode in this season features a special guest appearance, which continues a practice used in past seasons. This season has been released in various forms of home media, including on demand streaming.

== Production ==
Every episode in this season was written and directed by series creators Dave Willis and Matt Maiellaro, who have both written and directed every episode of the series. All episodes originally aired in the United States on Cartoon Network's late night programming block, Adult Swim. The theme music for this season was written and performed by Mariachi El Bronx and Schoolly D.

== Cast ==
=== Main ===
- Dana Snyder as Master Shake
- Carey Means as Frylock
- Dave Willis as Meatwad, Carl and Ignignokt

=== Recurring ===
- Matt Maiellaro as Err
- George Lowe as Jet Chicken
- C. Martin Croker as a bird

=== Guest appearances ===
- Lisa Lampanelli as Darlean (credited as Amanda B Reckondwith) in "Big Bro"
- Brooks Holcomb as Gerald in Big Bro"
- Dale Bunney as Angry Table in "Chicken and Beans"
- Brent Hinds as Boggle in Shirt Herpes"
- Brann Dailor as Uno in Shirt Herpes"
- Troy Sanders as Yahtzee in Shirt Herpes"
- Josh Homme as the giant octopus in Shirt Herpes"
- Andy Sandford as an unnamed man in Shirt Herpes"
- Brett Gelman as Rocket Horse in "Rocket Horse and Jet Chicken"
- Kyle Kinane as an unnamed doctor (uncredited) in Rocket Horse and Jet Chicken"
- Kyle Kinane as Dr. Balthazar in Buddy Nugget"
- Kurt Metzger as a Flavor Flav impersonator in Buddy Nugget"
- Sal Lupo as Owner of "Born 2 Burn" (also named Dominic) in Buddy Nugget"
- Michael Jai White as Zucotti Manicotti in Zucotti Manicotti"
- Zach White as Crimson Tightwad in Zucotti Manicotti"
- Mario Moginger as Totem pole member in "Totem Pole"
- Mario Liebl as Totem pole member in "Totem Pole"
- Dominik Kreilinger as Totem pole member in "Totem Pole"
- Daniel Liebl as Totem pole member in "Totem Pole"

== Episodes ==
No. overall	No. in season	Title	Directed by	Written by	Original release date	Prod. code	US viewers (millions)
111	1	"Big Bro" "The Iron Will"	Dave Willis & Matt Maiellaro	Dave Willis & Matt Maiellaro	June 24, 2012	1102	1.24
Carl and Frylock compete for the affections of Darlean, the mother of Frylock's little brother Gerald. Guest appearance: Lisa Lampanelli as Darlene.
112	2	"Chicken and Beans"	Dave Willis & Matt Maiellaro	Dave Willis & Matt Maiellaro	July 1, 2012	1101	1.06
Meatwad becomes an internet celebrity after vomiting on stage during a performance of his song "Chicken and Beans." However, internet stardom goes to his head and he's driven into the darkness. Shake tries to become just as famous as him to no avail, while Frylock seeks to bring Meatwad back home and away from his aggressive attitude.
113	3	"Shirt Herpes"	Dave Willis & Matt Maiellaro	Dave Willis & Matt Maiellaro	July 8, 2012	1103	1.25
Master Shake is tricked by Carl to take on his cursed T-shirt that will never come off unless another agrees to take it. Guest appearances: Brann Dailor as Uno, Brent Hinds as Yahtzee, Troy Sanders as Boggle, Josh Homme as The Giant Octopus. Note: This is the only episode to be rated TV-MA-S.
114	4	"Rocket Horse & Jet Chicken"	Dave Willis & Matt Maiellaro	Dave Willis & Matt Maiellaro	July 15, 2012	1105	1.21
Meatwad reads a story he had written about a fictional encounter he had with a "hero" named Jet Chicken, and his sidekick Rocket Horse. Guest appearances: George Lowe as Jet Chicken, Brett Gelman as Rocket Horse, Kyle Kinane as a doctor (uncredited), and Walter Newman as himself.
115	5	"The Granite Family"	Dave Willis & Matt Maiellaro	Dave Willis & Matt Maiellaro	July 22, 2012	1106	1.33
Master Shake, Meatwad, Frylock, and Carl barricade themselves in a bomb shelter after Master Shake starts a nuclear war in an attempt to revive an old cartoon series. Note: This episode was created due to the outrage of the now cancelled reboot of The Flintstones by Seth MacFarlane, creator of Family Guy, American Dad!, and The Cleveland Show.
116	6	"Bookie"	Dave Willis & Matt Maiellaro	Dave Willis & Matt Maiellaro	July 29, 2012	1107	1.19
Master Shake starts placing various bets with Carl's friends -- and ends up beaten and threatened with death. Guest appearance: Steve Schirripa as Dante
117	7	"Fightan Titan"	Dave Willis & Matt Maiellaro	Dave Willis & Matt Maiellaro	August 5, 2012	1104	1.28
Frylock constructs a giant female robot to stop Paul, previously seen in "Couples Skate", from destroying the city, but needs Master Shake, Meatwad, and Carl to pilot it with him. Their stupidity and aggressiveness, however, nearly compromises the plans.
118	8	"Buddy Nugget"	Dave Willis & Matt Maiellaro	Dave Willis & Matt Maiellaro	August 12, 2012	1108	1.19
Master Shake takes credit for Frylock's new social media invention the Buddy Nugget. Guest appearances: Kyle Kinane as Dr. Balthazar and Kurt Metzger as a Flavor Flav impersonator (uncredited).
119	9	"Zucotti Manicotti"	Dave Willis & Matt Maiellaro	Dave Willis & Matt Maiellaro	August 19, 2012	1110	1.18
Master Shake poses as Meatwad's new favorite TV character Zucotti Manicotti to taunt him, but things get sticky when the real Zucotti shows up in lieu of the situation and tries to prove his existence. Guest appearances: Carl Jones as The Real Zucotti Manicotti and Kevin Gillespie as Crimson Tightwad
120	10	"Totem Pole"	Dave Willis & Matt Maiellaro	Dave Willis & Matt Maiellaro	August 26, 2012	1109	1.30
Carl attends a concert at the local high school for a relatively unpopular band called Totem Pole. Guest appearances: Wolfchant as Totem Pole

== Home release ==
The entire ninth season was released in HD and SD on iTunes, the Xbox Live Marketplace, and Amazon Video.

== See also ==
- Alternative titles for Aqua Teen Hunger Force
- List of Aqua Teen Hunger Force episodes
- Aqua Teen Hunger Force

Preceded by Aqua Unit Patrol Squad 1	Aqua Teen Hunger Force seasons	Succeeded by Aqua TV Show Show
