= Attorney at law (disambiguation) =

Attorney at law may refer to:

- Attorney at law
- Harvey Birdman, Attorney at Law
- Harvey Birdman: Attorney at Law (video game)
- Lilet Matias: Attorney-at-Law
- She-Hulk: Attorney at Law
