= Aqua Teen Hunger Force season 6 =

Aqua Teen Hunger Force
- Season 6
- Volumes 6 and 7 DVD covers. The Volume Six set features episodes 1–4 and the Volume Seven set features episodes 5–10 from season six.
- Starring: Dana Snyder; Carey Means; Dave Willis
- No. of episodes: 10

Release
- Original network: Adult Swim
- Original release: March 29 – May 31, 2009

Season chronology
- ← Previous; Season 5 Next → Season 7

The sixth season of the animated television series, Aqua Teen Hunger Force originally aired in the United States on Cartoon Network's late night programming block, Adult Swim. Season six started on March 29, 2009, with "Gene E" and ended with "Last Last One Forever and Ever" on May 31, 2009, with a total of ten episodes. Aqua Teen Hunger Force is about the surreal adventures and antics of three anthropomorphic fast food items: Master Shake, Frylock, and Meatwad, who live together as roommates and frequently interact with their human next-door neighbor, Carl, in a suburban neighborhood in South New Jersey. In May 2015, this season became available on Hulu Plus.

The season six finale, "Last Last One Forever and Ever", was made as a special live action episode. The episode features David Long Jr., who had won a contest through Burger King in order to perform the role of a live action Carl. Episodes in season six were written and directed by Dave Willis and Matt Maiellaro. Almost every episode in this season features a special guest appearance, which continues a practice used in past seasons.

This season has been made available on DVD, and other forms of home media, including on demand streaming. In 2020, the episode "Shake Like Me" was pulled from further reruns and home media releases including the 2022 Aqua Teen Hunger Force: The Baffler Meal Complete Collection DVD set, due to "cultural sensitivities".

== Production ==
Every episode in this season was written and directed by series creators Dave Willis and Matt Maiellaro, who have both written and directed every episode of the series. All episodes originally aired in the United States on Cartoon Network's late night programming block, Adult Swim. This season was one of the original seasons branded under the Aqua Teen Hunger Force title before Willis and Maiellaro started using a different alternative title for each season in 2011.

== Cast ==
=== Main ===
- Dana Snyder as Master Shake
- Carey Means as Frylock
- Dave Willis as Meatwad, Carl, Ignignokt and Boxy Brown

=== Recurring ===
- Matt Maiellaro as Err and Gene E.
- C. Martin Croker as Dr. Weird
- George Lowe as policeman

=== Guest appearances ===
- Dana Swanson as She Creature in "She Creature"
- Vincent Pastore as Terry in "She Creature"
- Steve Schirripa voiced Dante in "She Creature"
- Tommy Blacha as Gary the Dairy Fairy and Dr. Wongburger in "Creature from Plague Lagoon"
- Jon Schnepp voiced the real Creature from Plaque Lagoon in "Creature from Plague Lagoon"
- Scott Adsit as Drewbecca in "2-And-a-Half-Star Wars Out of Five"
- Scott Fry as a pawn store Clerk in "2-And-a-Half-Star Wars Out of Five"
- Bill Hader as a balloon version of Adolf Hitler in "Der Inflatable Fuhrer"
- H. Jon Benjamin played a live action version of Master Shake named Don Shake in "Last Last One Forever and Ever"
- T-Pain as a live-action version of Frylock in "Last Last One Forever and Ever"
- David Long Jr. as a live action version of Carl in "Last Last One Forever and Ever"
- Drake E. Stephens as an unnamed child in "Last Last One Forever and Ever"

== Episodes ==
No. overall	No. in season	Title	Directed by	Written by	Original release date	Prod. code
79	1	"Gene E"	Dave Willis & Matt Maiellaro	Dave Willis & Matt Maiellaro	December 16, 2008 (DVD); March 29, 2009 (TV)	601
Master Shake discovers a genie at the dump who promises to grant wishes, but instead turns the Aqua Teens invisible. After inadvertently killing him, they discover a shrunken Carl. Frylock and Meatwad try to restore their visibility, while Carl and Master Shake use their cursed states to spy on women. Guest appearances: Kim Manning and Vanessa Palacios as the women in a bathroom
80	2	"Shake Like Me"	Dave Willis & Matt Maiellaro	Dave Willis & Matt Maiellaro	December 16, 2008 (DVD); April 5, 2009 (TV)	602
Master Shake is bitten by a radioactive black man, which causes him to turn black. Frylock and Meatwad try to reverse this, but after a confrontation with Boxy Brown, Master Shake must choose between restoring his old self and embracing his new black lifestyle that gave him new talents.
81	3	"She Creature"	Dave Willis & Matt Maiellaro	Dave Willis & Matt Maiellaro	December 16, 2008 (DVD); April 12, 2009 (TV)	603
A strange monster is inhabiting Carl's pool, and the Aqua Teens attempt to get to the bottom of the mystery. It turns out to be a mermaid, who has sex with Carl, Frylock, and Meatwad, who all explode as a result of being impregnated by the mermaid. Master Shake, meanwhile, does not explode, despite describing his supposed sexual encounter with the mermaid to no one, as they have exploded. Guest appearances: Vincent Pastore and Steve Schirripa provides the voice of Terry and his associate, Dante (both of whom are uncredited). Dana Swanson also stars as the She Creature.
82	4	"Chick Magnet"	Dave Willis & Matt Maiellaro	Dave Willis & Matt Maiellaro	December 16, 2008 (DVD); April 19, 2009 (TV)	604
Master Shake buys a "Chick Magnet" to attract women, but it merely brings out the feminine side of the Aqua Teens.
83	5	"The Creature from Plaque Lagoon"	Dave Willis & Matt Maiellaro	Dave Willis & Matt Maiellaro	April 26, 2009	605
Master Shake and Meatwad try to kidnap the Tooth Fairy. The Aqua Teens lose their teeth. This is a sequel to the season 4 episode "Dickesode". Dr. Wongburger returns. Guest appearance: Brendon Small as Dr. Wongburger, Jon Schnepp as The real Creature from Plaque Lagoon and Tommy Blacha as Gary the dairy fairy.
84	6	"Time Machine"	Dave Willis & Matt Maiellaro	Dave Willis & Matt Maiellaro	May 3, 2009	606
Frylock builds a time machine, but only goes to Carl's house.
85	7	"2-and-a-Half-Star Wars Out of Five"	Dave Willis & Matt Maiellaro	Dave Willis & Matt Maiellaro	May 10, 2009	607
When a pink man tries to blow up the moon, Frylock realizes that the attacker is a shaved Wookie from a local Star Trek tribute band named "Drewbacca". The Mooninites make a brief appearance at the end of the episode. Guest appearances: Scott Adsit as Drewbecca and Scott Fry as the Pawn Store Clerk.
86	8	"Fry Legs"	Dave Willis & Matt Maiellaro	Dave Willis & Matt Maiellaro	May 17, 2009	608
Frylock begins acting strangely after falling in love with a girl. He then murders her boyfriend and takes his body in an attempt to win her until he finds out she is actually a C.H.U.D.-like alien. Guest appearance: Natasha Leggero as an unnamed computer Technician
87	9	"Der Inflatable Fuhrer"	Dave Willis & Matt Maiellaro	Dave Willis & Matt Maiellaro	May 24, 2009	609
Frylock agrees to synthesize a virus for a shady client just to get paid from a freelance gig, only to start discovering his client to be Hitler in balloon form. Guest appearances: Bill Hader as the Inflatable Hitler.
88	10	"Last Last One Forever and Ever" "Live Action"	Dave Willis & Matt Maiellaro	Dave Willis & Matt Maiellaro	May 31, 2009	610
The Aqua Teens discover that water in the area is flammable. The episode begins and ends in animation, with live-action between. The story line concludes in "Rabbot Redux". Guest appearances: David Long, Jr. as Carl (live action), H. Jon Benjamin as Don Shake (live action), and T-Pain as Frylock (live action)

== Reception ==
Jonah Krakow of IGN gave "The Creature from Plaque Lagoon" a 7 out of 10, which is considered "Good", calling the episode "straight forward" and comparing it to the season four episode "Dickesode". Kraków gave "Time Machine" a negative score of 6.7, as well as a negative review, saying Master Shake's "Safety Fart" song was the only amusing part of the episode. "2-And-a-Half-Star Wars Out of Five" aka ("Pink Man") was given a 7.5 by Kraków, found several jokes throughout the episode amusing, but found the scene with Carl throwing batteries at Drew funny, he also stated "ATHF is all about the journey, not the destination". Kraków found Frylock's actions in "Fry Legs", a little strange and out-of-character for Frylock, who usually seen as the voice of reason. Kraków also found parts of "Fry Legs" humorous saying "yet another enjoyable episode that delivered its share of laughs, awkwardness and bloody chunks of flesh", and giving the episode a 7.9. Kraków found "Der Inflatable Fuhrer", easy to follow and was surprised with the direction the episode went in saying "The jokes were funny, the ideas were fresh and the outcome was predictable, but fulfilling nonetheless", and giving it an 8.2. Kraków gave "Last Last One Forever and Ever" ("Live Action") a score of 6.0, and a negative review, calling it "over-hyped" and saying "the show lost focus and failed to deliver the one thing that has kept it going for six seasons: jokes".

== Home release ==
The first four episodes from season six were released on the Aqua Teen Hunger Force Volume Six DVD on December 16, 2008, months prior to their official television debuts, along with nine episodes from season five. The remaining six episodes were released on the Aqua Teen Hunger Force Volume Seven June 1, 2010, along with five episodes from season seven. Both sets were distributed by Adult Swim and Warner Home Video and feature various special features, including behind the scenes on "Last Last One Forever and Ever" on the Volume Seven set. The Volume Seven DVD marks the first time episodes were released on DVD with completely uncensored dialogue. Both sets were later released in Region 4 by Madman Entertainment on February 10, 2010, and June 16, 2010, respectively.

This season was also released under the label "Season 7" in HD and SD on iTunes, the Xbox Live Marketplace, and Amazon Video under the label "Volume 7".

In 2020, Cartoon Network and Adult Swim pulled the episode "Shake Like Me" from their rerun rotation and streaming services, whose plot was described as an "animated equivalent of blackface", due to cultural sensitivities. However, the episode is still available on the Volume Six DVD.

Aqua Teen Hunger Force Volume Six
Set details			Special features
13 episodes; 2-disc set; 16:9 aspect ratio; Languages: English			Audio commentary: "Reedickyoulus"; "Hoppy Bunny"; "The Marines"; All episodes from Carl from 2007 and 2008; Terror Phone - short film starring Dana Snyder and Carey Means; All cut scenes from Zombie Ninja Pro-Am; Radical Axis Presents Radical Axis - featurette profiling show animators, Radical Axis; More Funny Pete Stuff
Release dates			Audio commentary: "Reedickyoulus"; "Hoppy Bunny"; "The Marines"; All episodes from Carl from 2007 and 2008; Terror Phone - short film starring Dana Snyder and Carey Means; All cut scenes from Zombie Ninja Pro-Am; Radical Axis Presents Radical Axis - featurette profiling show animators, Radical Axis; More Funny Pete Stuff
Region 1	Region 2	Region 4	Audio commentary: "Reedickyoulus"; "Hoppy Bunny"; "The Marines"; All episodes from Carl from 2007 and 2008; Terror Phone - short film starring Dana Snyder and Carey Means; All cut scenes from Zombie Ninja Pro-Am; Radical Axis Presents Radical Axis - featurette profiling show animators, Radical Axis; More Funny Pete Stuff
December 16, 2008	—N/a	February 10, 2010	Audio commentary: "Reedickyoulus"; "Hoppy Bunny"; "The Marines"; All episodes from Carl from 2007 and 2008; Terror Phone - short film starring Dana Snyder and Carey Means; All cut scenes from Zombie Ninja Pro-Am; Radical Axis Presents Radical Axis - featurette profiling show animators, Radical Axis; More Funny Pete Stuff

Aqua Teen Hunger Force Volume Seven
Set details
Special features
- 11 episodes
- 2-disc set
- 16:9 aspect ratio
- Languages:
- English
- Live Action Behind the Scenes: The Making of 12 Minutes of Television That Changed Television for 12 Minutes
- Rubberman Behind the Scenes: Our Mom and Uncle Sing About Condoms
- Dumb Down Your Smartphone
- Terror Phone II: The Legend of Rakenstein
- Live Action Carl: The Dave Long Story: Shave Your Head, Grow a Mustache and Gain 80 lbs for a Shot at Fame
Release dates
Region 1
Region 2
Region 4
June 1, 2010
—N/a
June 16, 2010

== See also ==
- "Last Last One Forever and Ever"
- List of Aqua Teen Hunger Force episodes
- Aqua Teen Hunger Force
