= Chick Magnet =

Chick Magnet may refer to:

- Chick Magnet (album), by Paul Wall, or the title song, 2004
- "Chick Magnet", a song by MxPx from Life in General, 1996
- "Chick Magnet" (Aqua Teen Hunger Force), a 2009 TV episode

== See also ==
- Chick Magnet Punk, now CM Punk, a professional wrestler
