= Bloody Tales of Disgraced Lands =

Studio album by Wolfchant
- Released: November 25, 2005
- Genre: Viking metal Pagan metal
- Length: 1:00:49
- Label: CCP Records

Wolfchant chronology
| The Herjan Trilogy (2004) | Bloody Tales of Disgraced Lands (2005) | A Pagan Storm (2007) |

Professional ratings
Review scores
| Source | Rating |
|---|---|
| Allmusic | 3.5/5 |
| Metal.de | 4/10 |
| Rock Hard | 5/10 |

Bloody Tales of Disgraced Lands is a debut full-length concept album about the war of the Clan of Cross by the German Viking / pagan metal band Wolfchant. It was released on November 25, 2005 through CCP Records. A re-recorded version of the album was included with the fifth studio album Embraced by Fire.

== Critical reception ==
Metal.de said the album is too long and lacks innovation. AllMusic noted "Clan of Cross," "Mourning Red," and "Clankiller" as highlights of the album.

== Track listing ==
| No. | Title | Length |
|---|---|---|
| 1. | "A Tale from the Old Fields" | 02:09 |
| 2. | "Clan of Cross" | 05:22 |
| 3. | "I Am War" | 04:28 |
| 4. | "Mourning Red" | 05:49 |
| 5. | "Of Honour and Pride" | 04:49 |
| 6. | "Ride to Ruhn" | 04:36 |
| 7. | "The Betrayal" | 04:37 |
| 8. | "Sacrifice" | 05:41 |
| 9. | "Blood for Blood" | 06:07 |
| 10. | "Clankiller" | 03:48 |
| 11. | "Revenge" | 07:21 |
| 12. | "Visions of Death" | 01:33 |
| 13. | "Praise to All" | 04:26 |
