= A Pagan Storm =

Studio album by Wolfchant
- Released: April 6, 2007
- Recorded: December 2006
- Genre: Viking metal Pagan metal Black metal
- Length: 50:38
- Label: CCP Records

Wolfchant chronology
Bloody Tales of Disgraced Lands (2005)	A Pagan Storm (2007)	Determined Damnation (2009)

A Pagan Storm is the second full-length album by the German Viking / pagan metal band Wolfchant. It was released on April 6, 2007 through CCP Records. In 2024, the album was re-recorded and released together with the original album by Reaper Entertainment.

== Critical reception ==
Professional ratings
Review scores
Source	Rating
AllMusic	3.5/5
Metal.de	5/10; 7/10 (re-recorded)
Rock Hard	6/10

laut.de stated that the record possesses a more puristic sound compared to the debut album since it doesn't include keyboards; however, the sound retains the same thin quality as on the debut. Metal.de in their original review said the band is clearly maturing but still called the album "cheesy". Reviewing the re-recorded version they said the album has better production values. AllMusic said the album has the appropriate Viking metal qualities.

== Track listing ==
1. "Growing Storms" – 1:55
2. "A Pagan Storm" – 4:55
3. "The Path" – 3:59
4. "Midnight Gathering" – 3:31
5. "A Wolfchant From the Mountain Side" – 5:06
6. "Guardians of the Forest" – 3:28
7. "Winter Hymn" – 6:50
8. "Stärkend Trunk Aus Feindes Schädel" – 5:44
9. "Voran" – 5:27
10. "Feuerbringer (Loki's Zankrede)" – 4:31
11. "The Axe, the Sword, the Wind and a Wolf" – 5:12

== Personnel ==
- Lokhi – vocals
- Gaahnt – bass
- Skaahl – guitar
- Derrmorh – guitar
- Norgahd – drums
