= Embraced by Fire =

Studio album by Wolfchant
- Released: March 1, 2013
- Genre: Viking metal Pagan metal
- Length: 1:43:16
- Language: English
- Label: NoiseArt Records

Wolfchant chronology
Call of the Black Winds (2011)	Embraced by Fire (2013)	Bloodwinter (2017)

Professional ratings
Review scores
Source	Rating
Metal.de	7/10
Powermetal.de	8.5/10
Rock Hard	5/10

Embraced by Fire is the fifth album by the German Viking / pagan metal band Wolfchant. It was released on May 1, 2013, in digipak format through NoiseArt Records and contains both new material and a re-recorded version of their first album Bloody Tales of Disgraced Lands.

== Track listing ==
CD 1
No.	Title	Length
1.	"Devouring Flames"	02:53
2.	"Embraced by Fire"	06:00
3.	"Element"	05:40
4.	"Turning Into Red"	05:34
5.	"Einsame Wacht"	05:38
6.	"Autumns Breath"	05:20
7.	"Freier Geist"	06:28
8.	"Winters Triumph"	06:28

CD 2
No.	Title	Length
1.	"A Tale From The Old Fields"	02:13
2.	"Clan of Cross"	05:11
3.	"I Am War"	04:39
4.	"Mourning Red"	05:34
5.	"Of Honour and Pride"	05:11
6.	"Ride to Ruhn"	05:14
7.	"The Betrayal"	04:22
8.	"Sacrifice"	05:19
9.	"Blood for Blood"	05:41
10.	"Clankiller"	03:34
11.	"Revenge"	07:25
12.	"Visions of Death"	01:39
13.	"Praise to All"	03:56

== Personnel ==
- Lokhi — vocals
- Nortwin - clean vocals
- Ragnar - guitar
- Skaahl - guitar
- Sarolv — bass
- Gvern — keyboard
- Norgahd — drums
- André hofmann — Choir
