= Wolfchant =

German metal band

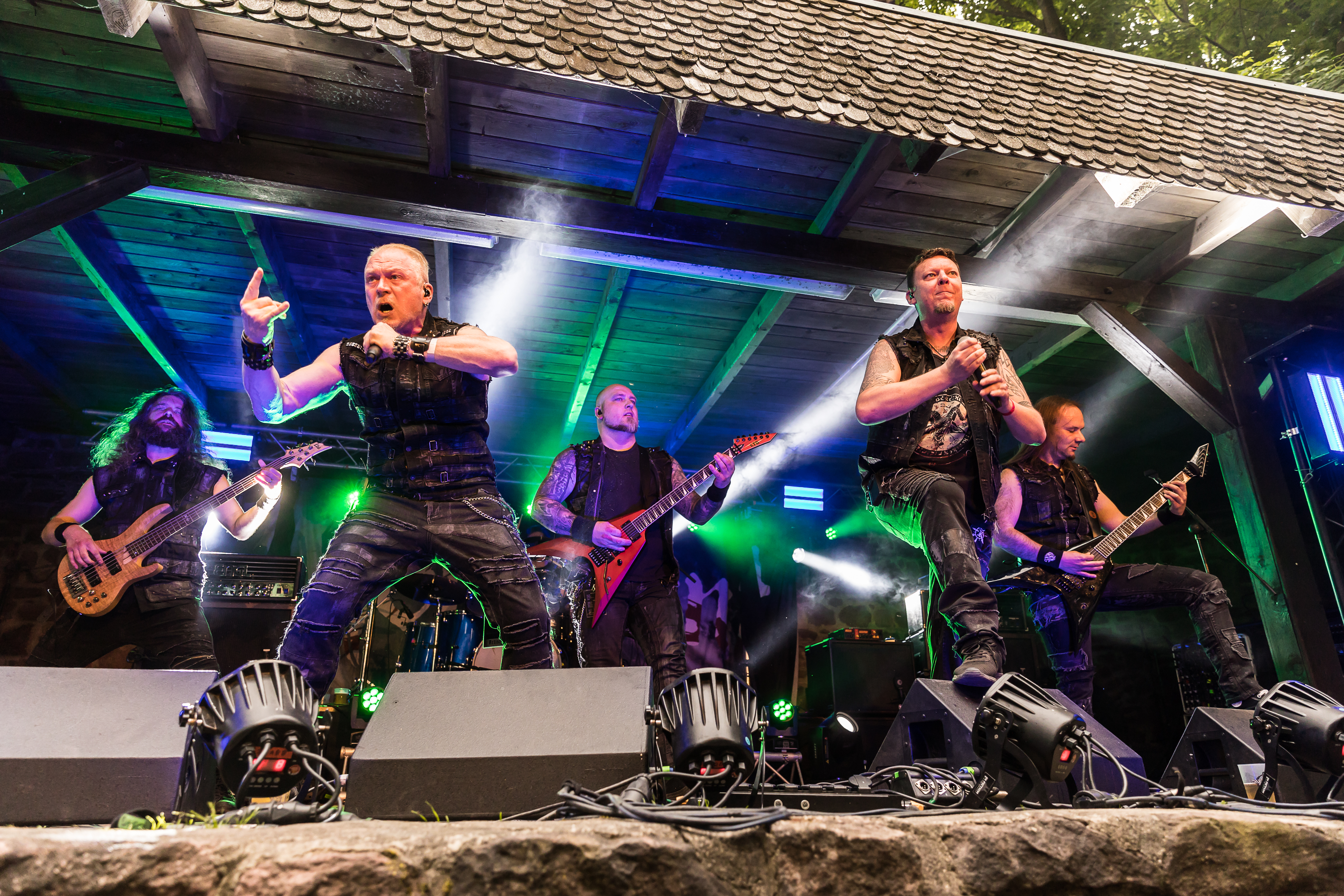
- Wolfchant performing in 2025

Background information
- Origin: Sankt Oswald, Lower Bavaria, Germany
- Genres: Viking metal, pagan metal
- Years active: 2003–present
- Labels: CCP; Massacre; NoiseArt; Reaper
- Members: Lokhi; Skaahl; Nortwin; Sertorius; Lug
- Past members: Norgahd, Gaahnt, Derrmorh, Nattulv, Bahznar, Gvern, Ragnar, Viktor, Gorthrim (Eddy Gross)

Wolfchant is a German metal band formed in Sankt Oswald in August 2003 by Lokhi (Mario Lokhi Möginger), Gaahnt, Skaahl (Mario Liebl), and Norgahad. Wolfchant's lyrics deal with legends and folk tales from Nordic mythology. In August 2005 they signed a contract with CCP Records, managed by Caleb Murrell-Smith. With the first full-length album Bloody Tales of Disgraced Lands (2005) the band gained supra-regional respect.

In February 2007 Nattulv became a member of Wolfchant after former bass guitar Gaahnt quit the band for family reasons. Nattulv was replaced by Bahznar, for their album Determined Damnation, which was released in April 2009.

The band made a guest appearance in the Aqua Teen Hunger Force episode "Totem Pole", which aired in 2012.

== Current line up ==
- Lokhi (Mario Lokhi Möginger) – vocals
- Skaahl (Mario Liebl) – lead guitar
- Nortwin (Michael Seifert) – clean vocals
- Sertorius (Stephan Tannreuther) – bass guitar
- Lug (Thomas Schmidt) – drums

== Discography ==
- The Fangs of the Southern Death (2004, demo)
- The Herjan Trilogy (2004, EP)
- Bloody Tales of Disgraced Lands (2005)
- A Pagan Storm (2007)
- Determined Damnation (2009)
- Call of the Black Winds (2011)
- Embraced by Fire (2013)
- Bloodwinter (2017)
- Omega: Bestia (2021)
