= Harvey Birdman: Attorney at Law (video game) =

2008 video game

- North American Wii version box art
- Developer: High Voltage Software
- Publisher: Capcom
- Producer: Kevin Sheller
- Designer: Micah Skaritka
- Programmer: Ben Scott
- Artist: Joe Whiteaker
- Writer: Merrill Hagan
- Composer: Michael Kohler
- Platforms: PlayStation 2, PlayStation Portable, Wii
- Release: NA: January 8, 2008
- Genres: Adventure, visual novel
- Mode: Single-player

Harvey Birdman: Attorney at Law is a 2008 visual novel adventure game developed by High Voltage Software and published by Capcom. It is based on the animated television series of the same name, and was developed in collaboration with the show's creative team and voice actors. The gameplay heavily borrows from Capcom's Ace Attorney series. It was released on January 8, 2008 for the Wii, PlayStation 2, and PlayStation Portable.

== Gameplay ==
A screenshot of the Harvey Birdman: Attorney at Law game. Here, Harvey Birdman grills Blue Falcone in the court with an opportunity to ask him by either showing him items Harvey has or by making him answer more specifically based on his testimony.

In Harvey Birdman: Attorney at Law, players control the eponymous Harvey Birdman as he investigates crime scenes and performs cross-examinations during trials. Gameplay is based on that of Capcom's Ace Attorney series and is similarly divided investigation and court segments. In investigation segments, players move between different environments to examine objects, locate evidence, and talk to non-player characters. Players learn new information by presenting the correct evidence to different characters, advancing the story. In court segments, players must cross-examine witnesses to find contradictions in their testimony. The player can press a witness's statement for more information or present evidence that proves the contradiction. Presenting the incorrect evidence causes Harvey to lose one of his crests, representing his health; losing all five crests results in a game over.

All of the show's voice cast reprise their roles for the video game, with the exception of Stephen Colbert; actors Stephen Stanton and Crispin Freeman respectively voice Phil Ken Sebben and Myron Reducto in his stead. Each of the game's cases features a hidden Street Fighter character cameo; finding each one unlocks a bonus video.

== Plot ==
The story is split between five self-contained episodes, each depicting a different legal case accepted by Harvey Birdman.

In "The Burning Question", Peter Potamus is accused of burning down half of Harvey's house, and Harvey chooses to defend him due to Peter saving his life. Harvey and Peter eventually prove that Harvey's wife Gigi started the fire due to signing a prenup that entitles her to half of any insurance claims, only to discover that she receives nothing because she put the wrong name instead of Harvey's.

In "The Cleaning Crew", Magilla Gorilla and Secret Squirrel are accused of robbing Harvey's office, and Harvey is forced to defend them. Harvey eventually determines the real culprit to be X the Eliminator, who stole Harvey's belongings to sell back to him in exchange for his crest.

In "From Glamour to Slamour", Yakky Doodle's latest name change to "Nailgun" lands him in jail when the authorities mistake him for a criminal of the same name. Harvey proves Yakky's innocence, but is jailed himself after he is found to not be carrying his attorney's license. While in jail, Harvey prosecutes another case and proves fellow inmate Number Two guilty of using a device to manipulate the facility's electronics, earning his freedom.

In "Personal Piracy", Peanut is suspected of copying music controlled by the RIAA without permission. Though Peanut is shown to be guilty, Harvey wins on a technicality due to the prosecutor, a clone of Harvey created by the Deadly Duplicator, being killed.

In "Two Birds, One Throne", Blue Falcone is put in charge of Sebben & Sebben while Phil is on vacation. Harvey is tricked into hiring prosecutors for his own trial, in which Falcone accuses him of embezzlement. Harvey eventually proves that Falcone was planning to fire everyone, shut down the firm, and use embezzled funds start his own tanning salon business. When Phil returns, he fires everyone anyway and the office is destroyed by a bomb.

== Development ==
On February 15, 2005, Cartoon Network Enterprises entered into a multi-territory agreement with Midway Games to publish video games based on five Adult Swim shows, one of them being Harvey Birdman: Attorney at Law. However, no game based on the series came out of this agreement.

In April 2007, Capcom announced that they would publish a game based on the series for a fall release on the PlayStation 2 and PlayStation Portable. In September, a Wii version was also announced, alongside a release date set for November 13. The game missed this release schedule and eventually launched on January 5, 2008.

== Reception ==
Reception

Aggregate score
Aggregator	Score		
Aggregator	PS2	PSP	Wii
Metacritic	63/100	62/100	60/100

Review scores
Publication	Score		
Publication	PS2	PSP	Wii
1Up.com	N/A	N/A	C
Adventure Gamers	N/A	N/A	2.5/5
The A.V. Club	C−	N/A	N/A
Electronic Gaming Monthly	5.83/10	N/A	5.83/10
Eurogamer	N/A	5/10	N/A
Game Informer	N/A	N/A	6/10
GamePro	N/A	3.75/5	N/A
GameRevolution	D−	D−	D−
GameSpot	6.5/10	6.5/10	6.5/10
GameSpy	3/5	N/A	3/5
GameTrailers	6.5/10	N/A	6.5/10
GameZone	7.1/10	N/A	7.5/10
IGN	7.4/10	7.4/10	7/10
Nintendo Life	N/A	N/A	6/10
Nintendo Power	N/A	N/A	6.5/10
PlayStation: The Official Magazine	4/5	N/A	N/A

The game received "mixed" reviews on all platforms according to the review aggregation website Metacritic.

Maxim gave the game a score of three stars out of five and said that it was "actually funny, and unlike The Simpsons Game, it's actually fun to play. Game play is lifted straight out of Capcom's own Phoenix Wright series. [...] It's short enough that you can finish it in a couple of nights, but all the show's characters are in effect... along with their respective voice actors. Finally, the game's budget price (around $30) means there's no need to shout, 'I object!' when the game store clerk rings you up."

However, The A.V. Club gave the PlayStation 2 version a C−, calling it "A decent rental, but not a wise investment." The New York Times gave the game an unfavorable review, stating that the game design was "just plain bad".

1Up.com gave the Wii version a C and said that "The script, penned by two of the show's creators, feels like slapped-together B material, and the rare laugh-out-loud moments -- such as trench coat-clad spy Secret Squirrel's penchant for flashing -- are recycled from funnier capers on the original series." They also lament that the investigations outside the courtroom lack voice acting, causing certain jokes to fall flat.
