= One Hundred (Aqua Teen Hunger Force) =

- Aqua Teen Hunger Force episode
- Frylock, Meatwad, and Shake depicted in a Scooby-Doo-like style.
- Episode no.: Season 7 Episode 12
- Directed by: Dave Willis; Matt Maiellaro
- Written by: Dave Willis; Matt Maiellaro
- Production code: 712
- Original air date: May 2, 2010
- Running time: 11:16 minutes

Guest appearances
- Robert Smigel as One Hundred; Nick Weidenfeld as a television executive; Tom Savini as a Cop; Amber Nash as Tabitha

Episode chronology
| ← Previous "Larry Miller Hair System" | Next → "Allen Part One" |
- Aqua Teen Hunger Force (season 7)

"One Hundred" is the twelfth and final episode of the seventh season of the animated television series Aqua Teen Hunger Force, and the 100th episode of the series overall. "One Hundred" originally aired in the United States on May 2, 2010, on Adult Swim. In the episode, Frylock obsesses about the number 100 while Master Shake attempts to put Aqua Teen Hunger Force into syndication, and the episode turns into a parody of Scooby-Doo halfway through.

This episode marks the second time an Adult Swim original series made it to 100 episodes, the first being Space Ghost Coast to Coast. "One Hundred" strongly parodies the Hanna-Barbera cartoon, Scooby-Doo. This is the final episode of the series to premiere branded as an Aqua Teen Hunger Force episode before the series started using alternative titles for each season as a running gag. This episode received a positive review by Ramsey Isler of IGN, and was the third highest rated program the night of its debut. This episode has been made available on DVD, and other forms of home media, including on demand streaming.

== Plot ==
Frylock is obsessed with the number 100. Master Shake then flies off to California to meet with television executives, and an animated version of Dana Snyder, the actual voice actor who provides the voice of Master Shake, pops out of him, demanding syndication money, claiming that it is the hundredth episode, so he deserves it. A television executive replies that because Aqua Teen Hunger Force is only eleven minutes long, they only have fifty half-hours of material. Dana Snyder then storms out of the room claiming that he'll be back in another eight years with another fifty half-hours of material ready.

Shortly after Master Shake returns home, One Hundred, a giant yellow monster in the shape of the number 100, appears and sends Master Shake, Frylock, and Meatwad into a different world, called "Aqua Unit Patrol Squad" which features the main characters in a Hanna-Barbera-like style, along with Tabitha, Shake's apparent girlfriend and new member of the group. They investigate a haunted house, where Dr. Weird, a monster (whose costume Carl wore half naked on the Internet), Handbanana, Dr. Wongburger, the Cybernetic Ghost of Christmas Past from the Future, Billy Witchdoctor.com, and Willie Nelson all make brief non-speaking cameo appearances. Carl makes a brief appearance as well. They all run into a monster (who decapitates Carl), soon after Frylock unmasks the monster, who turns out to be One Hundred in disguise. Shake tells him that he failed to put Aqua Teen Hunger Force in syndication, telling him that he even tried to double the episodes to make them fit in a half-hour time slot. One Hundred then kidnaps Tabitha and leaves with intent to kill her.

The closing credits feature Dana Snyder once again talking to a television executive, in an attempt to put Aqua Teen Hunger Force into syndication, but the television executive walks out on him, telling him that nothing he says is funny.

== Production ==
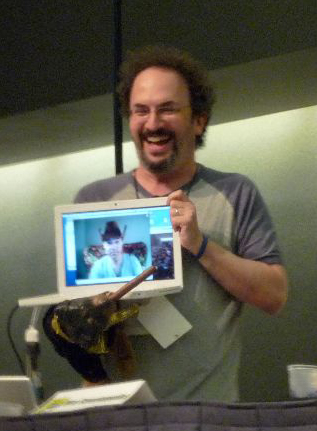
Robert Smigel provided the voice of One Hundred.

"One Hundred" was written and directed by series creators Dave Willis and Matt Maiellaro (credited as Comedian Matt "Crag Hartin Fan Club" Maiellaro) who have written and directed every episode of the series. It originally aired in the United States on Cartoon Network's late night programing block, Adult Swim, on May 2, 2010. This episode features guest appearances from Robert Smigel who voiced One Hundred, Nick Weidenfeld who voiced himself, Tom Savini who voiced an unnamed cop, and Amber Nash who voiced Master Shake's girlfriend Tabitha.

"One Hundred" is the final episode of season seven and is the 100th episode of Aqua Teen Hunger Force, and marking the second time an Adult Swim original made it to 100 episodes. The first original Adult Swim series to reach 100 episodes was Space Ghost Coast to Coast, which made a total of 110 episodes before officially ending in 2008.

This is the final episode of the series to officially premiere under the Aqua Teen Hunger Force name. As the series started using alternative titles as a running gag, starting with the next season. The following episode, "Allen Part One", was the first episode of the series to premiere under an alternative title.

== Cultural references ==
"One Hundred" makes reference to the 2007 psychological thriller film, The Number 23, when Frylock is obsessed with the number 100. "One Hundred" strongly parodies the Hanna-Barbera cartoon Scooby-Doo, Where Are You!: During the parody, called "Aqua Unit Patrol Squad", Meatwad becomes "Meaty Meaty Moo", a parody of the character Scooby-Doo, and Tabitha, a female character resembling Daphne and Velma, then joins the Aqua Unit Patrol Squad. The episode also references fellow Hanna-Barbera cartoon The Flintstones by having Master Shake and Frylock resemble Fred Flintstone and Barney Rubble, respectively, during the Scooby-Doo parody sequence while Carl takes on the appearance of Mr. Peebles from Magilla Gorilla.

== Reception ==
"One Hundred" was the highest-rated episode of season seven. In its original American broadcast on May 2, 2010, "One Hundred" was watched by 989,000 viewers, making it the third most watched Adult Swim program of that night, behind the season 3 premiere of The Boondocks and a repeat of Family Guy.

The episode then jumps to a Scooby-Doo parody, which Ramsey Isler of IGN called the "funniest stuff ATHF has done in a long time". IGN gave the episode a 7.8. out of 10, generally classifying it as "good", while commenting on how oddly dark humoured the events of the episode went, in a character showing up and stating his desire to behead another character, before taking her off into the woods, followed by someone talking to one of the network people from before, who criticized them for it.

== Home media ==
"One Hundred" was released on DVD in Region 1 as part of the Aqua Unit Patrol Squad 1: Season 1 DVD set on October 11, 2011, along with six other episodes from season seven and the entire eighth season. The set was released and distributed by Adult Swim and Warner Home Video, and features "Terror Phone 3" as a special feature, the set also features completely uncensored audio on every episode. The set was later released in Region 4 by Madman Entertainment on November 30, 2011.

This episode is also available in HD and SD on iTunes, the Xbox Live Marketplace, and Amazon Video.

== See also ==
- Lost Mysteries
