= Aqua Teen Hunger Force season 8 =

Aqua Teen Hunger Force
- Season 8
- The Aqua Unit Patrol Squad 1 title card used throughout the eighth season.
- Starring: Dana Snyder; Carey Means; Dave Willis; George Lowe
- No. of episodes: 10

Release
- Original network: Adult Swim
- Original release: May 8 – July 24, 2011

Season chronology
- ← Previous; Season 7 Next → Season 9

The eighth season of the animated television series Aqua Teen Hunger Force, alternatively titled Aqua Unit Patrol Squad 1 (or AUPS1), originally aired in the United States on Cartoon Network's late night programming block, Adult Swim. Season eight premiered with the two-part episode "Allen" on May 8, 2011, and May 15, 2011, respectively; and ended with "Last Dance for Napkin Lad" on July 24, 2011, with a total of ten episodes. The show is about the surreal adventures and antics of three anthropomorphic fast food items: Master Shake, Frylock, and Meatwad, who live together as roommates and frequently interact with their human next-door neighbor, Carl Brutanunanulewski in a suburban neighborhood in Seattle, Washington, which is completely identical to their former New Jersey home seen in past seasons. In May 2015, this season became available on Hulu Plus, and in May 2020, it became available on HBO Max.

Season eight is the first season in which the alternative titles for each season gag was set into place, starting with Aqua Unit Patrol Squad 1. Episodes in season eight were written and directed by Dave Willis and Matt Maiellaro. Almost every episode in this season features a special guest appearance, which continues a practice used in past seasons. Dave Willis and Matt Maiellaro received Annie Award nominations for writing in the season eight episode, "The Creditor". This season has been made available on DVD, and other forms of home media, including on demand streaming.

== Production ==
Series creators Dave Willis and Matt Maiellaro wrote and directed every episode in this season, as they have for every previous season. All episodes originally aired in the United States on Cartoon Network's late night programming block, Adult Swim. As with most seasons, several episodes originally aired outside of their production order.

Despite being the eighth season of Aqua Teen Hunger Force, the show itself was renamed Aqua Unit Patrol Squad 1. Along with the new name, the season featured a new theme song by Josh Homme and Alain Johannes as well as a new opening sequence. Co-creator Matt Maiellaro announced that for the 2012 season, the show's title would be changed again to Aqua Something You Know Whatever and that the producer's intention was to change the title every year.

The song "Big Foot" from the Chickenfoot album Chickenfoot III was featured in the season eight episode "Last Dance For Napkin Lad". The episode aired July 24, 2011 prior the official release of the song on August 2, 2011. Chickenfoot had previously voiced themselves in the season seven episode "IAMAPOD".

== Cast ==
=== Main ===
- Dana Snyder as Master Shake
- Carey Means as Frylock
- Dave Willis as Meatwad, Carl Brutanunanulewski and Ignignokt
- George Lowe as the episode title announcer

=== Recurring ===
- Matt Maiellaro as Err and Markula
- C. Martin Croker as Dr. Weird and Steve

=== Guest appearances ===
- Steven Wright as Danny in "Allen Part One"
- Michael K. Williams as an unnamed in "Allen Part One"
- Donnie Blue as an unnamed in "Allen Part One"
- Matt Berry as Allen in "Allen Part Two"
- Idris Elba as a police officer in "The Intervention"
- Tom Hollander as Chuck in "Vampirus"
- Duncan Trussell as a Wi-tri in "Wi-Tri"
- Gregg Turkington as a Wi-tri in "Wi-Tri".
- Zach Hanks as Lance, the "Sham Wow!" host in "Lasagna"
- Todd Hanson as Napkin Lad in "Last Dance for Napkin Lad".

== Episodes ==
No. overall	No. in season	Title	Directed by	Written by	Original release date	Prod. code
101	1	"Allen Part One"	Dave Willis & Matt Maiellaro	Dave Willis & Matt Maiellaro	May 8, 2011	1001
Master Shake freezes himself nine years into the future in order to wake up in a new time where more crime takes place. Guest appearance: Steven Wright as Danny
102	2	"Allen Part Two"	Dave Willis & Matt Maiellaro	Dave Willis & Matt Maiellaro	May 15, 2011	1002
Master Shake tries to find the rest of the Aqua Unit Patrol Squad, and investigates the lightning striking down evil-doers in the future. Guest appearances: Matt Berry as Allen, Michael K. Williams as Unnamed Man in White Vest, Larry Gilliard Jr. as Donnie Blue as Unnamed Moustached Man with a Knife
103	3	"The Intervention"	Dave Willis & Matt Maiellaro	Dave Willis & Matt Maiellaro	May 22, 2011	1004
Carl likes to drive while inebriated, and he continues to do so by any means necessary even if it means running into the same officer of the law. Guest appearance: Idris Elba as the police officer
104	4	"Freedom Cobra"	Dave Willis & Matt Maiellaro	Dave Willis & Matt Maiellaro	June 5, 2011	1003
Master Shake acquires a tattoo of a snake called "Freedom Cobra" to get laid. Soon enough, the tattoo comes to life and commands Shake to keep itself alive by eating flesh, murdering others in the process. Note: The sounds of people screaming replaces the credits theme. Guest appearance: Gregory Alan Williams as the tattoo artist and Lance Reddick as the Freedom Cobra
105	5	"The Creditor"	Dave Willis & Matt Maiellaro	Dave Willis & Matt Maiellaro	June 12, 2011	1005
Shake tells his psychologist about an unusual experience with an extraterrestrial loan officer known as the Creditor.
106	6	"Vampirus"	Dave Willis & Matt Maiellaro	Dave Willis & Matt Maiellaro	June 19, 2011	1006
The Squad may have stumbled upon the cure for a vampire-inducing virus created by their former Landlord Markula. Guest appearance: Tom Hollander as Chuck
107	7	"Wi-tri"	Dave Willis & Matt Maiellaro	Dave Willis & Matt Maiellaro	June 26, 2011	1008
Frylock's new Wi-tri device causes disastrous levels of apathy and views of the sitcom Entourage. Guest appearance: Duncan Trussell and Gregg Turkington as Wi-tris
108	8	"Jumpy George"	Dave Willis & Matt Maiellaro	Dave Willis & Matt Maiellaro	July 10, 2011	1009
Shake and Carl date the same woman simultaneously who happens to be under intergalactic witness protective services from the Moonnites.
109	9	"Lasagna"	Dave Willis & Matt Maiellaro	Dave Willis & Matt Maiellaro	July 17, 2011	1010
After Carl is placed under house arrest for assaulting a prostitute who bit off his tongue, he befriends an infomercial host who talks him into making wrong decisions when Shake tempts Carl with a homemade lasagna. The host pushes Carl off the roof of his house in another attempt to obtain the lasagna, breaking every bone in Carl's body. He makes up for it by giving him a milkshake that promises to restore his bones, however it ends up merging all of his bones into one. Shake leaves the lasagna near Carl's hospital bed as a gift, only for it to be a trap as Shake has the lasagna tethered to a helicopter he's piloting and the episode ends with Carl falling out the window. Guest appearance: Zach Hanks as Lance, Eddie Pepitone as Nick
110	10	"Last Dance for Napkin Lad"	Dave Willis & Matt Maiellaro	Dave Willis & Matt Maiellaro	July 24, 2011	1007
Skeletons attack the Aqua Unit Patrol Squad. Carl is revealed to be a spy (Lars) who has been observing Master Shake (Flint), Frylock, and Meatwad (Ryan) for the past ten years. Guest appearance: Todd Hanson as Napkin Lad Featured music: "Big Foot" by Chickenfoot Notes: Shake, Carl, and Meatwad's names are revealed: Flint, Lars, and Ryan. Given the one-off parodic nature of this episode, however, it is doubtful this is hard canon.

== Reception ==
In 2011 Dave Willis and Matt Maiellaro received Annie Award nominations for writing in the season eight episode, "The Creditor", in the category of Writing in a Television Production during the 39th Annie Awards, held on February 4, 2012. Willis and Maiellaro lost the award to Carolyn Omine for witting The Simpsons season twenty three episode "Treehouse of Horror XXII".

== Home release ==
Aqua Unit Patrol Squad 1: Season 1 DVD cover art which features the entire eighth season.

The entire eighth season was released on the Aqua Unit Patrol Squad 1: Season 1 DVD set in Region 1 on October 11, 2011, along with seven episodes from the seventh season. The set was released by Adult Swim and distributed by Warner Home Video, and features uncensored dialogue and the special feature "Terror Phone 3". The set was later released in Region 4 by Madman Entertainment on November 30, 2011.

This season was also released under the label Aqua Unit Patrol Squad 1: Season 1 in HD and SD on iTunes, the Xbox Live Marketplace, and Amazon Video.

Aqua Unit Patrol Squad 1: Season 1
Set details			Special features
17 episodes; 2-disc set; 16:9 aspect ratio; Languages: English			Terror Phone 3
Release dates			Terror Phone 3
Region 1	Region 2	Region 4	Terror Phone 3
October 11, 2011	—N/a	November 30, 2011	Terror Phone 3

== See also ==
- Alternative titles for Aqua Teen Hunger Force
- "Allen"
- List of Aqua Teen Hunger Force episodes
- Aqua Teen Hunger Force

Preceded by Season 7	Aqua Teen Hunger Force seasons	Succeeded by Aqua Something You Know Whatever
