= Determined Damnation =

Studio album by Wolfchant
- Released: April 17, 2009
- Genre: Pagan metal
- Length: 51:29
- Label: Massacre Records
- Producer: Uwe Lulis

Wolfchant chronology
A Pagan Storm (2007)	Determined Damnation (2009)	Call of the Black Winds (2011)

Determined Damnation is the third studio album by German metal band Wolfchant, released on April 17, 2009.

== Critical reception ==
Professional ratings
Review scores
Source	Rating
AllMusic	2.5/5
Metal.de	7/10
Rock Hard	5/10

AllMusic wrote: "[...] the group's riffs and melodies simply weren't as memorable this time out [...]". Metal.de called the album the band's best work yet. Metal Hammer liked the English-language tracks much more than the German-language ones.

== Track listing ==
No.	Title	Length
1.	"Determination Begins"	1:14
2.	"World in Ice"	4:28
3.	"Until the End"	5:46
4.	"Determined Damnation"	4:35
5.	"In War"	4:07
6.	"Fate of the Fighting Man"	4:23
7.	"Kein Engel hört dich flehen"	3:41
8.	"A Raven’s Flight"	4:02
9.	"Never Too Drunk"	4:00
10.	"Schwerter der Erde"	4:55
11.	"Auf Blut gebaut"	5:33
12.	"Under the Wolves' Banner"	4:45
13.	"Devour" (Digipak bonus track)
14.	"Warcry" (Digipak bonus track)

== Personnel ==
Wolfchant

- Lokhi – vocals
- Norgahd – drums
- Skaahl – lead guitars
- Derrmorh – rhythm guitars
- Bahznar – bass guitars

Guest musicians

- Michael Seifert (from Rebellion) – choirs
- Uwe Lulis (from Rebellion) – acoustic guitars (on "Until the End" and "Never Too Drunk"), solo guitars (on "Fate of the Fighting Man" and "Schwerter der Erde")
- Dieter Kasberger – keyboards
