= Aqua Teen Hunger Force season 5 =

Aqua Teen Hunger Force
- Season 5
- Volume Six DVD cover, which features the entire fifth season, except "Boston".
- Starring: Dana Snyder; Carey Means; Dave Willis
- No. of episodes: 10 (1 unaired)

Release
- Original network: Adult Swim
- Original release: January 20 – March 23, 2008

Season chronology
- ← Previous; Season 4 Next → Season 6

The fifth season of the animated television series, Aqua Teen Hunger Force originally aired in the United States on Cartoon Network's late night programming block, Adult Swim. Season five started on January 20, 2008, with "Robots Everywhere", and ended with "Bible Fruit" on March 23, 2008. Aqua Teen Hunger Force is about the surreal adventures and antics of three anthropomorphic fast food items: Master Shake, Frylock, and Meatwad, who live together as roommates and frequently interact with their human next-door neighbor, Carl in a suburban neighborhood in South New Jersey. In May 2015, this season became available on Hulu Plus.

Although ten episodes were produced for season five, only nine episodes aired. An episode entitled "Boston" was scheduled to air as part of season five, but Adult Swim pulled it to avoid further controversy surrounding the 2007 Boston bomb scare. Episodes in season five were written and directed by Dave Willis and Matt Maiellaro. Almost every episode in this season features a special guest appearance, which continues a practice used in past seasons.

Jonah Krakow of IGN has given episodes from this season a range of both positive and negative reviews. Krakow criticized the violent killing of kittens by Master Shake in "Reedickyoulus", saying it was "going too far". The season five finale, "Bible Fruit", lead to the creation of a short lived spin-off series called Soul Quest Overdrive, which later premiered on May 25, 2011, on Adult Swim. This season has been made available on DVD, and other forms of home media, including on demand streaming.

== Production ==
Every episode in this season was written and directed by series creators Dave Willis and Matt Maiellaro, who have both written and directed every episode of the series. Episodes originally aired in the United States on Cartoon Network's late night programming block, Adult Swim. This season was one of the original seasons branded under the Aqua Teen Hunger Force title before Willis and Maiellaro started using a different alternative title for each season in 2011. As with most seasons, several episodes originally aired outside of their production order.

Season five is the first season of the series to be produced in 16:9 high definition. This was the first season to air after the debut of Aqua Teen Hunger Force Colon Movie Film for Theaters, and after the series got national attention from the 2007 Boston Bomb Scare.

=== "Boston" ===
"No - it wasn't my fault, and whoever leaked it is a dick. Whatever that was, it was half-done, if that. We had a GREAT script - and we were going to complete it for this run of 10 eps - but then weren't allowed to finish it. And then this leaked. I was hoping we could always have one completed episode that no one was ever going to get to see, and then 40 years from now, Betty White's emaciated titanium exoskeleton could open the Williams Street vaults to view the lost episode on TV Land. It would have been fitting. But the internet won't let you have nice things."

— Dave Willis' Reddit AMA on the leaked episode and reasoning.

An episode satirizing the 2007 Boston Mooninite panic entitled "Boston" was produced to serve as the fifth season premiere. The 2007 Boston bomb scare occurred on January 31, 2007, when various LED displays resembling Aqua Teen Hunger Force characters Ignignokt and Err were placed in various locations in Boston, Massachusetts, and were mistaken for explosive devices. Subsequently, the entire city was shut down for security purposes, Cartoon Network General Manager and Executive Vice President Jim Samples resigned, and the network's parent company Turner Broadcasting paid $2 million in damages. Adult Swim was forced by Turner Broadcasting's legal department to pull the episode completely. The second episode, "Robots Everywhere" served as the season premiere on January 20, 2008.

During the production of "Boston", executives at Adult Swim were very nervous about the episode leading to further controversy, and Willis and Maiellaro were tasked to re-write the episode; three different versions of "Boston" were ultimately produced. When asked about the episode, Maiellaro stated it is relatively tame in comparison to what South Park creators would have done in a similar situation. Maiellaro stated that it was written as if it was something that could happen in reality, unlike most episodes that mainly focus on surreal plot lines. Willis also mentioned a guest appearance by comedian Paul F. Tompkins, who Willis referred to as an "amazing comedian". Maiellaro has claimed "Boston" is his favorite episode.

An unfinished version of "Boston" was illegally leaked online in 2015. The episode has never been aired or formally released to the public in any format by Adult Swim. Willis has indirectly stated that there are no plans for its formal release at any time in the foreseeable future. During a Reddit AMA in June 2015, Willis expressed his disdain for the unfinished episode being leaked. According to cast members, Dana Snyder and Carey Means, the episode was slated for an early 2015 release, months before the show's eleventh season that same year prior from the leak. This marks the first time an episode of the series has been pulled.

On April 12, 2023, over sixteen years after the incident, a screening of the unfinished episode debuted at the Berklee Performance Center on May 20, 2023.

== Cast ==
=== Main ===
- Dana Snyder as Master Shake
- Carey Means as Frylock
- Dave Willis as Meatwad, Carl and Ignignokt

=== Recurring ===
- Matt Maiellaro as Err and Markula
- George Lowe as a gum salesman

=== Guest appearances ===
- Paul F. Tompkins as a policeman in "Boston"
- Fred Armisen as a robot dad in "Robots Everywhere"
- Rachel Dratch as a robot mom in "Robots Everywhere"
- Vishal Roney as a potential house buyer in "Robots Everywhere"
- Diviya Roney as a potential house buyer in "Robots Everywhere"
- Sam Harrigan as various robots in "Robots Everywhere"
- Molly Harrigan as various robots in "Robots Everywhere"
- Sadie Willis as various robots in "Robots Everywhere"
- Max Willis as various robots in "Robots Everywhere"
- John Kruk as himself in "Sirens"
- Neko Case as Chrysanthemum in "Sirens"
- Kelly Hogan as The B.J. Queen in "Sirens"
- Scott Adsit as Hoppy Bunny in "Hoppy Bunny"
- Vincent Pastore as Terry in "Laser Lenses"
- T-Pain as a dummy in "Dummy Love"
- Josh Homme as the Dummies in "Dummy Love"
- Alexander Katz in "The Marines"
- Scott Luallen in "The Marines"
- David Cross (credited as "Sir Willups Brightslymoore") as Bert Banana in "Bible Fruit"
- H. Jon Benjamin (credited as Jon "thenHammer" Benjamin") as Mortimer Mango in "Bible Fruit"
- Kristen Schaal (credited as "Frannie Hood") as Tammy Tangerine in "Bible Fruit"

== Episodes ==
No. overall	No. in season	Title	Directed by	Written by	Original release date	Prod. code
69	1	"Boston"	Dave Willis & Matt Maiellaro	Dave Willis & Matt Maiellaro	Unaired	501
Master Shake and Frylock take Meatwad to Boston to advertise him for an online auction. Guest appearance: Paul F. Tompkins as a police officer
70	2	"Robots Everywhere"	Dave Willis & Matt Maiellaro	Dave Willis & Matt Maiellaro	November 5, 2007 (video game special feature); January 20, 2008 (TV)	502
When the Aqua Teens are abducted by demons and cocooned by military spiders in the Mojave Desert orchestrated by their landlord Markula, Carl tries to sell their house to robots. The robots turn out to be terrible neighbors for Carl, especially when they try to kill him. Guest appearances: Fred Armisen, Rachel Dratch, Vishal Roney, Diviya Roney, Sam Harrigan, Molly Harrigan, Sadie Willis, and Max Willis.
71	3	"Sirens"	Dave Willis & Matt Maiellaro	Dave Willis & Matt Maiellaro	January 27, 2008	503
A trio of Sirens (Chrysanthemum, The BJ Queen, and John Kruk) move into the Aqua Teens' house and catch Carl's interest. Guest appearances: Neko Case, Kelly Hogan, and former professional baseball star John Kruk.
72	4	"Couples Skate"	Dave Willis & Matt Maiellaro	Dave Willis & Matt Maiellaro	February 3, 2008	507
The Aqua Teens must either escape the spider cocoons their landlord Markula has trapped them in, or pay the rent they owe him. Meanwhile Carl gets yet another new neighbor, a huge demon named Paul who is going through a difficult custody battle.
73	5	"Reedickyoulus"	Dave Willis & Matt Maiellaro	Dave Willis & Matt Maiellaro	February 10, 2008	504
Carl's new male enhancement device produces some unsavory side effects, including radioactive human waste. Ground contamination leads to Meatwad's buried deceased pets to rise from the dead for some sexually transmitted zombification laced revenge against Shake for nuking them in the microwave. The zombified ape signs that she has an STD. Shake doesn't seem to care and goes to get some "free sex", he later returns as an STD-infected zombie with an insatiable appetite for brains. Frylock calls the hotline and they tell him to have Shake wait outside and a party bus full of gay zombies will pick him up. After a tearful good bye, Meatwad and Frylock take Shake outside and the party bus picks him up. Meatwad calls "first smoke" and lights up a cigarette, Frylock warns about the gas leak, but too late the house blows up. Notes: This is the first episode to receive a TV-MA-V rating.
74	6	"Hoppy Bunny"	Dave Willis & Matt Maiellaro	Dave Willis & Matt Maiellaro	February 17, 2008	505
Carl buys a recorder that has an ulterior motive. Seemingly unrelated, Carl's home becomes a haven for furries. We learn that Frylock's gem holds the power of 1,000 suns which Master Shake pawns. Special Guest appearances: Scott Adsit as Hoppy Bunny and Scott Fry as the Pawn Store Clerk
75	7	"Laser Lenses"	Dave Willis & Matt Maiellaro	Dave Willis & Matt Maiellaro	March 2, 2008	506
Master Shake's megalomania soars to new heights once he steals Frylock's laser-shooting contact lenses. The Aqua Teens end up getting illegal medical treatment from Carl's cousin Terry. Guest appearance: Vincent Pastore as Terry (uncredited)
76	8	"Dummy Love"	Dave Willis & Matt Maiellaro	Dave Willis & Matt Maiellaro	March 9, 2008	508
Shake torments Meatwad by reading a story written by Rob Zombie. Frylock gets a package with a ventriloquist dummy that wants to "KILL!" The Aqua Teens try multiple ways to kill the dummy but to no avail, he keeps coming back. They resolve to give the killer dummy to Carl. The Killer Dummy makes a discovery and finds love with Carl's dummy who wants people to "DIE!" The dummies start dating and want Frylock's bed to get it on. Master Shake finds a way to profit off their immortality. Meatwad wishes that they were real boys. The next day, Shake's dummies are gone replaced by flesh and blood boy versions of the dummies. Shake proceeds to try to kill them with a battle-axe. Shake ends up in jail and wants Meatwad to wish upon the same star to wish him the f**k out of jail, but Meatwad "don't talk to suckas boy." The dummies talk to Shake on the phone. All they say is "KILL!" and "DIE!" Shake hangs up. "He hung up." "Yeah he hung up." Guest appearances: T-Pain and Joshua Homme.
77	9	"The Marines"	Dave Willis & Matt Maiellaro	Dave Willis & Matt Maiellaro	March 16, 2008	509
Frylock flees to Canada when Meatwad unwittingly enlists the Aqua Teens into the US Marine Corps. While Frylock deals with a masochistic puppet, Master Shake and Meatwad go AWOL and pretend to be gay to escape the service. The episode ends with product placement advertisements for Aqua Teen Hunger Force Colon Movie Film for Theaters, Aqua Teen Hunger Force Zombie Ninja Pro-Am and the Aqua Teen Hunger Force Volume Five DVD. Guest appearances: Alexander Katz, Scott Luallen.
78	10	"Bible Fruit" "Fruits"	Dave Willis & Matt Maiellaro	Dave Willis & Matt Maiellaro	March 23, 2008	510
Frylock decides to invite his MySpace friends over for the evening. To Frylock's surprise, they too are anthropomorphic food; a meth-addicted mango, an abused tangerine, and an alcoholic banana. Though they are all Born-Again Christians, exposure to the Aqua Teens brings back their old habits. Guest appearances: David Cross (credited as "Sir Willups Brightslymoore"), H. Jon Benjamin (credited as Jon "the Hammer" Benjamin"), and Kristen Schaal (credited as "Frannie Hood")

== Reception ==
The season five episode "Bible Fruit" lead to the creation of a short lived spin-off, Soul Quest Overdrive. In 2010, the pilot episode of Soul Quest Overdrive was released online though Adult Swim's "Big Uber, Network Sampling" feature. Six episodes of the series were ordered, four of them aired back-to-back on May 25, 2011, during Adult Swim's "DVR Theater". The series has not been aired since, leaving two episodes unaired. This would be the third Aqua Teen Hunger Force spin-off behind Spacecataz and Carl's Stone Cold Lock of the Century of the Week.

Jonah Krakow of IGN gave "Robots Everywhere" a 5.5 out 10, which considered "Mediocre", saying "We could get deeply psychoanalytical and say that Carl's confusion and annoyance with the robots is a metaphor for the audience's suffering and the robots are the staff of ATHF doing the torturing". Kraków gave the following episode, "Sirens" an 8, which is considered "Great", saying "Thankfully, this episode was much stronger than last week as Carl and his sexual desires were the focus of the comedy instead of annoying robots". Krakow gave "Couples Skate" an 8.3 and praised the return of Master Shake, Frylock, and Meatwad, calling it a "solid episode". Kraków gave "Reedickyoulus" gave this episode an 8.5, and gave this episode a good review, but said Master Shake killing kittens in a microwave was "going too far". "Hoppy Bunny" was given an 8 by Kraków, who praised this episode for originality saying "Not too many shows out there would touch Furries". Kraków gave "Laser Lenses" a 7, who noted that the episode didn't give any new information or insight about any of the characters saying "They simply ran around, pissed each other off and got themselves into disgusting circumstances. Sometimes, that's good enough". Kraków gave "Dummy Love" a 7.0, and said the episode had funny moments but wasn't as funny as it could be, and that the episode has a lot of potential, which it didn't live up to saying. "The Marines" revived Krakow's lowest score of the season with a 5.5. Krakow said the only funny parts of "The Marines" were Saw parody and the CGI gum commercial funny, saying "Unfortunately, the majority of this episode just didn't work at all. The jokes were old or non-existent, the plot made no sense and Carl wasn't there as an additional source of comedy". Krakow gave "Bible Fruit" the greatest score of the season, 9.5, which is considered "amazing; and gave the episode a good review saying it was a great way to end the season.

== Home release ==
Nine episodes from season five were released on the Aqua Teen Hunger Force Volume Six DVD on December 16, 2008, along with the first four episodes from season six, prior to their original television debuts. The set was released by Adult Swim and distributed by Warner Home Video, and features several special features including the 2007 and 2008 episodes of Carl's Stone Cold Lock of the Century of the Week (then known as I'm Pissed) and commentaries on select episode. The set was released in Region 4 by Madman Entertainment on February 10, 2010. "Robots Everywhere" was originally released as a special feature on the Aqua Teen Hunger Force Zombie Ninja Pro-Am video game on November 5, 2007, months prior to its official television debut on January 20, 2008.

This season was also released under the label "Season 6" on iTunes and the Xbox Live Marketplace in HD and SD, and on Amazon Video under the label "Volume 5".

Aqua Teen Hunger Force Volume Six
Set details			Special features
13 episodes; 2-disc set; 16:9 aspect ratio; Languages: English			Audio commentary: "Reedickyoulus"; "Hoppy Bunny"; "The Marines"; All episodes from Carl from 2007 and 2008; Terror Phone - short film starring Dana Snyder and Carey Means; All cut scenes from Zombie Ninja Pro-Am; Radical Axis Presents Radical Axis - featurette profiling show animators, Radical Axis; More Funny Pete Stuff
Release dates			Audio commentary: "Reedickyoulus"; "Hoppy Bunny"; "The Marines"; All episodes from Carl from 2007 and 2008; Terror Phone - short film starring Dana Snyder and Carey Means; All cut scenes from Zombie Ninja Pro-Am; Radical Axis Presents Radical Axis - featurette profiling show animators, Radical Axis; More Funny Pete Stuff
Region 1	Region 2	Region 4	Audio commentary: "Reedickyoulus"; "Hoppy Bunny"; "The Marines"; All episodes from Carl from 2007 and 2008; Terror Phone - short film starring Dana Snyder and Carey Means; All cut scenes from Zombie Ninja Pro-Am; Radical Axis Presents Radical Axis - featurette profiling show animators, Radical Axis; More Funny Pete Stuff
December 16, 2008	—N/a	February 10, 2010	Audio commentary: "Reedickyoulus"; "Hoppy Bunny"; "The Marines"; All episodes from Carl from 2007 and 2008; Terror Phone - short film starring Dana Snyder and Carey Means; All cut scenes from Zombie Ninja Pro-Am; Radical Axis Presents Radical Axis - featurette profiling show animators, Radical Axis; More Funny Pete Stuff

== See also ==
- List of Aqua Teen Hunger Force episodes
- Aqua Teen Hunger Force
