= Call of the Black Winds =

Studio album by Wolfchant
- Released: February 25, 2011
- Recorded: November–December 2010
- Studio: Studio C
- Genre: Pagan metal
- Length: 55:04
- Label: Massacre Records
- Producer: Markus Stock

Wolfchant chronology
Determined Damnation (2009)	Call of the Black Winds (2011)	Embraced by Fire (2013)

Professional ratings
Review scores
Source	Rating
Metal.de	8/10
Powermetal.de	7/10
Rock Hard	7/10

Call of the Black Winds is the fourth studio album by German metal band Wolfchant, released on February 25, 2011.

== Critical reception ==
Metal.de said the album is a significant improvement from previous records. The songs were noted as more varied, direct and mature. Most of the songs were claimed to have hit potential. The clean vocals of Michael "Nortwin" Seifert were said to be perfectly integrated and were compared to the band Grave Digger. Powermetal.de praised Seifert's vocals and Markus Stock's production. The riffs were described as simple yet concise and keyboard arrangements as slightly folky which results in a mix of catchy, broadly appealing music.

== Track listing ==
Call of the Black Winds track listing
No.	Title	Length
1.	"Black Winds Rising (Prelude)"	2:07
2.	"Stormwolves"	5:39
3.	"Eremit"	4:25
4.	"Black Fire"	4:21
5.	"Naturgewalt"	5:35
6.	"Heathen Rise"	6:11
7.	"Never Will Fall"	4:10
8.	"Die Nacht der Wölfe"	4:21
9.	"The Last Farewell"	4:22
10.	"Der Stahl in meinem Feinde"	4:56
11.	"Call of the Black Winds"	8:57

== Live DVD ==
A live DVD was packaged with the limited edition.

Contents

- Making of: Call of the Black Winds
- Live at Wolfszeit Festival 2007
  - "A Pagan Storm"
  - "Praise to All"
- Live at Walpurgis Metal Days 2009
  - "World in Ice"
  - "Fate of the Fighting Men"
  - "Rebellion"
- "World in Ice" video

== Personnel ==
- Lokhi – harsh vocals
- Nortwin – clean vocals
- Skaahl – lead and solo guitars
- Derrmorh – rhythm and solo guitars
- Gvern – keyboards
- Bahznar – bass guitars
- Norgahd – drums
