= Last Last One Forever and Ever =

- Aqua Teen Hunger Force episode
- A promotional set photo
- Episode no.: Season 6 Episode 10
- Directed by: Matt Maiellaro; Dave Willis
- Written by: Matt Maiellaro; Dave Willis
- Production code: 610
- Original air date: May 31, 2009
- Running time: 11:40 minutes

Guest appearances
- David Long, Jr. as Carl (live action); Jon Benjamin as Don Shake (live action); T-Pain as Frylock (live action); Drake E. Stephens as an unnamed kid (live action)

Episode chronology
| ← Previous "Der Inflatable Fuhrer" | Next → "Rubberman" |
- Aqua Teen Hunger Force (season 6)

"Last Last One Forever and Ever" (also known as "Live Action") is the tenth and final episode in the sixth season of the American animated television series Aqua Teen Hunger Force. The 88th episode of the series overall, it originally aired in the United States on Adult Swim on May 31, 2009. In the episode, Don Shake, a live-action version of Master Shake, attempts to write a successful novel in order to afford his rent in a live-action universe. This episode ends on an unofficial cliffhanger, which is continued in the season seven episode "Rabbot Redux".

"Last Last One Forever and Ever" was made as a special "live action" episode with the majority of the episode taking place in a live-action set. This episode features comedian H. Jon Benjamin as a live-action version of Master Shake named Don Shake; recording artist T-Pain portrayed a live-action version of Frylock, and a "brownish" exercise ball was used to portray Meatwad. It also featured David Long, Jr., who portrayed the role of their neighbor, Carl, after winning an open casting call sponsored by Burger King to fill the role.

Then-Adult Swim vice president Mike Lazzo considered not airing it on television. This episode received a mixed review from Jonah Krakow of IGN, and was the third highest rated program on the night of its original debut. This episode has been made available on DVD, and other forms of home media, including on demand.

== Plot ==
Frylock discovers that the water in the area is flammable; he tries to warn Master Shake, who is drinking from a hose, and Meatwad, who is bathing at a car wash, which leads to it exploding. Shake and Frylock go next door to warn Carl, who is standing in his pool with sticks of dynamite, but Carl ignores their warning as he farts into the pool, causing a huge explosion seen from outer space.

The scene transitions to a live-action shot of Frylock reading a script, which describes the events that previously transpired, written by "Don" Shake; it is dismissed by Frylock as "terrible". It is soon revealed that Shake has made several attempts to write stories but has failed to receive any compensation, despite promising ten-percent of his future earnings to his roommate. Frylock, growing frustrated with Shake for his lack of income, warns him he needs to leave the house. Meanwhile, Shake goes to the "exercise room" in Frylock's home and sits down next to an exercise ball, from which comes the voice of Meatwad. Shake shares his feelings about Frylock and his method of writing stories; in turn, Meatwad agrees to help Shake write a story, which contains elements taken verbatim from the children's program SpongeBob SquarePants.

Later, while at work at Dr. Weird's Castle (a shoddy children's pay venue consisting of several bouncy castles inside a run down warehouse), Shake seeks an opinion from Carl on the story, and is advised to add scenes with lesbians and women's breasts. Shake heads back to Meatwad to talk more about the story, who reacts to the changes with adamant disapproval. Following Frylock entering the room to exercise and then leaving, Meatwad advises Shake to kill Frylock with a sword in the closet. Shake is then seen sneaking across to Frylock, who is on Craigslist looking for a new roommate, with Meatwad holding up the sword. When Frylock turns toward Shake, Shake nicely offers the sword to Frylock, saying "Here's your sword, I found it in my room". Afterwards, Shake gets an idea for the ending to his story.

The scene transitions back to animation, in which the trio is seen putting their things into a moving truck, and saying goodbye to Carl. Shake says his final words to Carl, and as the camera slowly focuses on Carl, he solemnly intones, "Truly, they were an Aqua Teen Hunger Force." Shake then drives the moving truck slowly away with the emergency brake on while Carl angrily shouts at him for it. As the credits roll, the live-action Carl is seen standing in Dr. Weird's Castle, and soon pumps his fist while shouting one of his famous catchphrases: "Tonight!" The episode ends on somewhat of a cliffhanger, with the storyline being continued in the season seven episode "Rabbot Redux" and the screening says ''The End''.

== Production ==
H. Jon Benjamin as Don Shake (left) standing next to David Long, Jr., who won a contest sponsored by Burger King to play the live action version of Carl.

"Last Last One Forever and Ever" was written and directed by series creators Dave Willis and Matt Maiellaro, who have written and directed every episode of the series. It originally aired in the United States on Cartoon Network's late night programming block, Adult Swim, on May 31, 2009. It features live-action guest appearances from David Long, Jr. as live-action Carl, H. Jon Benjamin as live-action Master Shake (named Don Shake), T-Pain as live-action Frylock, and Drake E. Stephens.

Auto-Tune was used for T-Pain's dialog on and off throughout the episode as a reference to his music, which frequently features it. Despite the episode being predominantly live action, the beginning and end sequences were made in the same animation used throughout the regular series. Adult Swim vice president Mike Lazzo strongly considered not airing the episode on television and instead making it a DVD extra or posting it on YouTube.

In 2008 Adult Swim launched a nationwide casting call contest, sponsored by Burger King, whose winner would get to appear as a live-action version of Carl. The search began in July 2008 in San Diego, California, during San Diego Comic-Con, where contestants dressed as Carl performed their auditions. Fans also sent in application videos to the Adult Swim website. Willis stated in an interview that several people were turned down for the role, including Kyle Gass of Tenacious D and Samuel L. Jackson; the winner was David Long, Jr. from Ebensburg, Pennsylvania. Adult Swim aired a bump stating that there were legal issues regarding the casting of an "outsider" in the role.

== Reception ==
In its original American broadcast on May 31, 2009, "Last Last One Forever and Ever" was watched by 824,000 viewers, making it the third most watched Adult Swim program of that night, behind a repeat of Family Guy and a repeat of Robot Chicken. Jonah Krakow of IGN gave the episode a six out of ten which is considered "okay", calling it "over-hyped" and saying that "the show lost focus and failed to deliver the one thing that has kept it going for six seasons: jokes".

== Home release ==
"Last Last One Forever and Ever" was released on DVD in Region 1 as part of the Aqua Teen Hunger Force Volume Seven DVD set on June 1, 2010, along with five other episodes from season six and five episodes from season seven. The set was released and distributed by Adult Swim and Warner Home Video, and features behind-the-scenes footage for "Last Last One Forever and Ever". The set features completely uncensored audio on every episode, which marks the first time episodes were released on DVD with completely uncensored dialogue. The set was later released in Region 4 by Madman Entertainment on June 16, 2010.

This episode is also available in HD and SD on iTunes, the Xbox Live Marketplace, and Amazon Video.
