= Dana Swanson =

American actress

Dana Swanson is an American actress, writer, comedian, and the current voice of SARA v3.0 and SARA v4.0 for Toonami as of April 27, 2013. She (Note: Swanson uses they/them and she/her pronouns. This article uses she/her for consistency.) serves as supporting host to TOM v5.0 and TOM v6.0, voiced by Steve Blum.

Swanson attended the University of Georgia, where she graduated with a degree in TeleArts in 2004, joined Williams Street the following year as a production coordinator, and was promoted to a writer/producer role in 2010. Swanson (under the name Insane-o-flex) also co-wrote and performed "I Like Your Booty (But I'm Not Gay)" for the Aqua Teen Hunger Force Colon Movie Film for Theaters's soundtrack.

On April 27, 2013, when Toonami overhauled its look by introducing the TOM 5 era and retiring the TOM 3.5 era look that and from May 26, 2012, to April 20, 2013, on Adult Swim (TOM 3.5 was an HD version of the TOM 3.0 look from 2004 to 2007 on Cartoon Network), SARA made a surprise return to the block after several years' absence with an updated look and voiced by Swanson. The current SARA look is a full-bodied fairy hologram.

Swanson provided the voice of a member of the band "Advantage" in the Homestar Runner DVD-exclusive toon "The Limozeen Advantage".

She is non-binary and genderqueer.
