= Michael Kohler (musician) =

- Origin: United States
- Genres: Electronic, rock, pop, soundtrack
- Occupations: Composer, music producer, sound engineer
- Years active: 1993–present
- Website: http://www.bluetube.com

Michael Kohler is an American composer, music producer and sound designer who has composed music for numerous television shows, commercials and promos since 1993. A large number of his compositions have been created for commercials and promos for Cartoon Network and its spinoff network Boomerang. He has also done compositions for Nickelodeon, Toon Disney, and E!.

Kohler has been lead sound designer and mixer for series such as Adult Swim series Harvey Birdman, Attorney at Law, 12 oz. Mouse, Perfect Hair Forever, Stroker and Hoop, Aqua Teen Hunger Force and its film Aqua Teen Hunger Force Colon Movie Film for Theaters, and the first four seasons of FX series Archer. Kohler also voices himself on the Aqua Teen Hunger Force season seven episode "A PE Christmas".

Kohler composed music for Too Many Cooks, Stroker and Hoop, Aqua Teen Hunger Force, Harvey Birdman, Attorney at Law, The Bremen Avenue Experience, the original theme music for Boomerang used from its launch in 2000 to 2014, the current theme music for Boomerang, and the 2010 Cartoon Network mnemonic. He has also composed music, sound designed and mixed many animated shorts, pilot episodes, promos, and commercials since 1993 for clients like Adult Swim, Cartoon Network, Saatchi & Saatchi, Hulu, FX, Nickelodeon, N@N, Awesome Inc., FXX, Boomerang, TCM, Cartoon Network Latin America, TNT, Fuel TV, Mun2, E!, Toon Disney.

Kohler currently owns Bluetube, a full-service recording studio and audio post facility in Atlanta, Georgia. He attended the University of Akron in Akron, Ohio.
