= Aqua Teen Hunger Force Zombie Ninja Pro-Am =

2007 video game

- North American box art
- Developer: Creat Studios
- Publisher: Midway Games
- Designer: Jack H. Davis
- Composer: Andrew Sega
- Platform: PlayStation 2
- Release: NA: November 5, 2007; AU: November 15, 2007; EU: November 16, 2007
- Genres: Action-adventure, racing, sports, beat 'em up
- Modes: Single player, Multiplayer

Aqua Teen Hunger Force Zombie Ninja Pro-Am is a 2007 golf video game developed by Creat Studios and published by Midway Games for the PlayStation 2. It is based on the Cartoon Network/Adult Swim animated television series Aqua Teen Hunger Force. It is a hybrid kart racing/fighting/golf game that takes place on several New Jersey golf courses. It was released in North America on November 5, 2007, in Australia on November 15, and in Europe on November 16. The game features all of the actors on the show at that time and includes four full episodes of Aqua Teen Hunger Force. ESPN sportscaster Scott Van Pelt provides commentary for the game.

== Plot ==
Frylock has been accepted into an exclusive golf course, and allows Shake and Meatwad to come as guests. In the end, Shake manages to win and acquire a trophy, although he angers the audience at the podium by insulting golf. He is then killed by Mega Ultra Chicken in a Mortal Kombat reference.

== Gameplay ==
The golf segment of the game features nine holes. The first few holes are located on Jersey Pines golf course and are based on locations within the show, such as the tar pits, the Moon, Hell, and a fantasy level that Meatwad creates with Osirus' t-shirt. There are also three levels where the Aqua Teens race against the Frat Aliens giving the segment a total of 12 levels.

After teeing off, Master Shake or Frylock can be controlled as they fight their way to the balls' resting place. They face several foes, such as Carl's giant crabs, the brownie monsters, Turkatron, and the Mooninites. When the Aqua Teens reach the green they must defeat that hole's boss before they can putt.

In the golf segment's racing levels, the trio race their golf cart through the course they just played, shooting Frat Aliens with a bazooka, collecting speed boosts, and passing check points toward the goal of completing three laps to move on to the next level.

There are easter eggs on each level for both the golf and racing sections. The Aqua Teens can collect cameos and pieces of the Broodwich to unlock a special Broodwich battle video.

== Development ==
On February 15, 2005, Cartoon Network Enterprises entered into a multi-territory agreement with Midway Games to publish video games based on six Adult Swim shows, one of them being Aqua Teen Hunger Force. The other programs included in the agreement were The Brak Show, Harvey Birdman, Attorney At Law, Sealab 2021, and Space Ghost Coast to Coast.

== DVD release ==
Several cutscenes of the game were made available as a special feature on the volume 6 DVD.

== Reception ==
Reception

Aggregate scores
Aggregator	Score
GameRankings	42.06%
Metacritic	37/100

Review scores
Publication	Score
1Up.com	C
GameRevolution	F
GameSpot	3.5/10
GamesRadar+	1/5
GameZone	4.9/10
IGN	5/10
PlayStation: The Official Magazine	1/5
The A.V. Club	C

The game received generally unfavorable reviews and reception upon release; GameRankings gave it a score of 42.06%, while Metacritic gave it 37 out of 100.

Sam Bishop of IGN gave the game a score of 5 out of 10, writing: "It can be a hilarious waste of time (Meatwad's caddy pep talk was brilliant), but a waste none the less." Alex Navarro of GameSpot gave it a score of 3.5 out of 10, writing: "Just because a game seemingly aims to be bad on purpose doesn't make it any less of a bad game." However, even among negative reviews, the game's inclusion of ESPN sportscaster Scott Van Pelt was singled out for praise. Nick Suttner of 1Up.com gave the game a C stating: "For $30, there's plenty of ATHF goodness to satiate fans looking for more of a good thing (that makes the most of its M rating, no less), but if you have no interest in the show or haven't seen it, educate yourself before even considering Pro-Am. It's not a good game, but it's still a fun way to expand the ATHF world.

== See also ==
- Ninja Golf
- Zany Golf
