= FishCenter Live =

- The logo from an episode broadcast Thursday, 19 November 2020, featuring cartoon depictions of the five hosts and the 2019 "Galaxy King" Th'Lump
- Genre: Comedy; Talk show Fish Entertainment
- Presented by: Dave Bonawits; Andrew Choe; Matt Harrigan; Max Simonet; Christina Loranger
- Country of origin: United States
- Original language: English
- No. of episodes: 1400+

Production
- Running time: 60 minutes (web, 2014 – 2020); 120 minutes (web, 2020); 11 minutes (television)
- Production company: Williams Street

Original release
- Network: adultswim.com (online); Adult Swim (television)
- Release: September 16, 2014 – November 25, 2020

FishCenter Live (also shortened to FishCenter or FC Live or simply FCL) is an American talk show created by Mike Lazzo and hosted by Dave Bonawits, Andrew Choe, Matt Harrigan, Christina Loranger, and Max Simonet. It premiered on the official website of Adult Swim in September 2014 and started airing on television in February 2015. The series ended on November 25, 2020, following the shutdown of Adult Swim's livestream division.

== Summary and production ==
FishCenter Live was presented as a weekday call-in talk show narrating over footage of tropical fish swimming around in a fish tank. The fish are ranked according to their points, which are awarded when the fish complete a number of challenges. These challenges include "Coin Quest," floating over coins that are superimposed on the video feed.

The show was hosted by Dave Bonawits, Andrew Choe, Matt Harrigan, (Note: Harrigan, a creative director at the network, was first hired at Turner Broadcasting System in 1994. The Wall Street Journal observed this relationship as a rule of management to not "get hung up on hierarchy and protocol" at the studio.) Christina Loranger (since 2019), and Max Simonet, employees from the digital department room of Adult Swim. An original incarnation of the show involved a straight video feed of the fish tank, without narration. Commentary and a phone number for call-in segments were later added. Initially, callers were mostly other Adult Swim employees; when the competition portion was added, the hosts saw an increase of outside callers.

Starting in 2015, both Dave Bonawits and Max Simonet began hosting another show for the streams, a New York Times crossword solving show initially called Crossword. The series was re-titled Bloodfeast in 2016, and later received two television spin-offs: Tender Touches and Gēmusetto Machu Picchu.

Due to the COVID-19 pandemic, the show was done remotely starting in March 2020, with the hosts talking through Zoom. During this time, two hosts left for extended hiatuses: Dave Bonawits left from late April to early June for parental leave, while Andrew Choe left in late July after feeling burnt out, returning for the show's final two weeks in November. The show was reduced to just three days a week in September, running two hours every Tuesday through Thursday, while also being simulcasted to YouTube and Twitch.

On November 10, 2020, parent company WarnerMedia announced a large round of layoffs, with Adult Swim being affected. Among the laid off staff were all of the FishCenter Live hosts, except for Max Simonet, and the layoffs ultimately resulted in the cancellation of the Adult Swim streams. Following two more weeks of programming, FishCenter Live, and the Adult Swim streams as a whole, ended on November 25, 2020, with a two-part finale declaring TZ2 as the last Galaxy King. The live stream then became a silent feed of the fish tank until its eventual removal in January 2021.

== Final animal cast ==
Name	Species	Tank
Bijou	Marine betta grouper	One tank
Green Chicken formerly Midoritori or Gunboat Diplomat	Bird wrasse	One tank
Hamburger or Eel Hamburger	Zebra moray	One tank
Hot Steve formerly Lupin the Third	Foxface rabbitfish	One tank
Mimosa	Queen coris	One tank
Promises	Wolf eel	One tank
Slider	Sailfin tang	One tank
Tabitha Pillows	Short-nosed unicornfish	One tank
Th'Lump	White-spotted puffer	One tank
Wei	Emperor angelfish	One tank
Ed Keshem	Bird wrasse	Quarantine tank
TZ2	Pinktail triggerfish	Quarantine tank
[unnamed]	Crayfish	Crawfish tank

=== Former animal cast ===
Name	Species	Reason for departure
Dottie	Clown triggerfish	Death (February 19, 2016)
Long Donovan	Yellow-brown wrasse	Death (August 26, 2016)
Mammoth	Harlequin tuskfish	Death (September 6, 2016)
Ronside	Majestic angelfish	Death (September 21, 2016)
Sir Squirt	Lagoon triggerfish	Death (October 3, 2016)
"Yo Hal Look At That Tang" Tang	Sohal surgeonfish	Removed from tank due to size and aggression
Ol' Blue	King angelfish	Removed from tank due to size and aggression, sold at fish store
David Anderson	Crayfish	Death (May 15, 2015) Live food fed to Hamburger
Hoagie Kush	Sea urchin	Death (June 28, 2016) eaten by Th'lump
Ale	Squirrelfish	Death (July 16, 2018)
Styletoy	Flame angelfish	Death (October 29, 2018)
Mom	Arothron meleagris (or "Golden Puffer")	Death (February 3, 2019)
Greenbird (or "Greenberg")	Bird wrasse	Death (February 11, 2019)
Tan	Fake plant	Removed due to aggression (August 26, 2019)
Top Xander Cupper	Pinktail triggerfish	Death (September 3, 2019)
Lady	White Cloud Mountain minnow	Death (March 30, 2020)
Lucky	White Cloud Mountain minnow	Death (May 18, 2020)
Jeremy Legg	Cuban hogfish	Declared missing (October 2020)

=== Super and Galaxy Kings ===
Year	Winter	Spring	Summer	Fall	Galaxy King
2015	Tang	Hamburger	Mammoth	Sir Squirt	Mammoth
2016	Sir Squirt^{*}	Hamburger	Greenbird	Mimosa	Greenbird
2017	Th'Lump	TX Cupper	Greenbird	Greenbird	Greenbird
2018	Hot Steve	Ale^{†}	Mimosa	Hamburger	TX Cupper
2019	Th'Lump	Mimosa	Bijou	Hamburger	Th'Lump
2020	Ed Keshem	Th'Lump	TZ2	Tabitha Pillows	TZ2

^* Sir Squirt was represented by Hamburger in the 2016 Galaxy series. Due to Sir Squirt's death the second place fish for the Winter season, being Hamburger, was declared the Super King representative.
^† Ale was represented by TX Cupper in the 2018 Galaxy series due to Ale's untimely death earlier in the year.

== Games ==
The callers, fish, and guests compete for points in various games:

- Coin Quest: fish swim into the coins superimposed over the tank to collect points. A live-version sponsored by Snickers was played at the 2017 San Diego Comic-Con where the fish swim into the Snickers chocolate bars to "eat" them. Rednex's "Cotton Eye Joe", The New Vaudeville Band's "Winchester Cathedral", and the theme song to Family Feud are commonly played during this game.

Games created for guests have included:

- Alvuvuzelays Noise Game: the band Alvvays competed in a vuvuzela impersonation game. They also did a quiz on Canadian Thanksgiving.
- Guess This Gourd: a game with Post Malone.
- More-Bid-Angel: someone had to choose the highest-priced angel figurine.
- Truth or Se-Dare-Is: Truth or dare? with author David Sedaris. The caller dared Sedaris to wear socks on his hands for the rest of the show.
- What's Your Fetus?: made for death metal band Dying Fetus, someone had to guess what was hidden in a person's pelvic region based on an X-ray photograph.

== Guests ==
100 gecs, Alvvays, George Clinton, Carach Angren, Consider the Source, Dinosaur Jr., Injury Reserve, John Maus, Dying Fetus, Billie Eilish, Yung Lean, Daughters, Hard Working Americans (HWA), Colin Hay, Le Butcherettes, Los Lobos, Morbid Angel, Pigeons Playing Ping Pong, Rainbow Kitten Surprise, David Sedaris, Tower of Power, Trampled by Turtles, Black Lips, and Turkuaz played on FishCenter Live. Alvvays' played the song "Not My Baby" from their sophomore album Antisocialites. HWA played the songs "Burn Out Shoes" and "Half Ass Moses". HWA was on tour promoting their live album We're All In This Together. Post Malone was also a guest twice and did Trivia on frequent FishCenter guest Kelvin Taylor (actor), along with being bitten by Mom after drinking 9 beers on his first appearance. Waka Flocka Flame and DJ Whoo Kid played on FCL as well. Fish-themed Joy Division cover band, Koi Division, said their dream is to appear on FishCenter Live. George Clanton and Nick Hexum played the song "Aurora Summer". 100 Gecs later included their performances on the show in the digital version of 1000 Gecs and the Tree of Clues, released on July 10, 2020. The final band to play on the show was Dawes, who appeared on the November 12, 2020 episode.

== Collaboration ==
On 24 October 2019, American rock band Cage the Elephant released a music video for their single "Social Cues". It was shot at FishCenter Live with additional direction from Matt Shultz.

== Homages ==
In the episode broadcast Thursday, 13 December 2018, a parody of the original Star Trek's USS Enterprise was featured called the "USS FishCenterprise NCC-1065." 1065 is a reference to the street number for Williams Street, which produces content for Adult Swim.

== Broadcast and reception ==
What is our version of a sports show? What is our version of a relationship Q&A show? You can test these things out, just as we did with FishCenter, in an office with a couple microphones.

— Mike Lazzo, Adult Swim executive

FishCenter Live was originally released in September 2014 on Adult Swim's official website. The show came about when staff decided to film the tropical fish swimming around their aquarium as an idea for developing content for the website's online streaming channels. New episodes were presented on weekdays. The show was added to the network proper in February 2015, broadcast at 4 a.m. These airings are condensed versions of the live version, consisting of 11-minute highlights from each day. (Note: These broadcast versions have also been uploaded to the network's YouTube channel.)

In the first week of its televised broadcast, the show garnered 2.6 million viewers in total. In a press release, the network ranked the program first place across all targeted demographics in its time slot during the second week of March 2015. The network observed some of these viewers as confused Twitter users, wondering if the show was a prank. After these airings, live viewership rose from 120 to 5,000. The success led to the creation of a separate live stream dedicated to the network's Toonami block.

In August 2017, a premiere of a Rick and Morty episode was delayed due to an episode of FishCenter Live on the same live stream.

Critical reception has been positive. Adweek's Jason Lynch called FishCenter Live "its flagship livestreaming show." The Comedy Bureau received the series favorably with "you'll find, while giggling the whole way through, that you do get sort of invested in the individual fish." Decider's Kayla Cobb said "[i]t's weird, but it works." Ranked sixth in their list of best "unknown" television series of 2015, Newsday's Verne Gay reviewed ""FC Live" is insane — as such, a perfect distillation of all that is Adult Swim." The Outline's Samuel Argyle said "FishCenter border[s] on the avant-garde. JamBase's Andy Kahn called it "wacky." The Guardian's Mark Lawson critiqued "Ambitiously, this is a phone-in show, although disappointingly, the fish don't take the calls, but swim in tanks that surround the presenters." The A.V. Club's Erik Lindvall said FishCenter "the latest weird thing" to come from the network "in a streak of really weird things", describing it as a "wonderful, web-based world of piscine sports".

Live for Live Music's Ming Lee Newcomb described FishCenter Live as "eccentric" and "bizarre." Ranked fourth in their list of "[t]he 26 Weirdest Adult Swim Shows Ever," Deadspin's Sheldon Pearce commented "Adult Swim employees came up with this one, which means it's definitely on-brand if nothing else." In reviewing Tender Touches, Geek's Jose Rodriguez said the pilot had "more in common with Xavier: Renegade Angel or FishCenter." Reviewing their Alvvays performance, Uproxx's Derrick Rossignol declared "every band should be on it, because at the very least, it's one of the most bizarre live internet shows you can possibly watch." Later, while reviewing the Post Malone episode, Rossignol followed-up with "a totally bizarre, daytime, aquatic, call-in web show that doesn't make much sense, and that's what makes it great." In an interview with host Max Simonet, Sonoma Index-Tribune's David Templeton remarked "[it's] a bizarrely simple cult-hit web-and-television show."

== Controversy ==
In 2016, two Dragon Con cosplayers, claiming an association with Adult Swim and Cartoon Network and wore "Make FishCenter Great Again" hats, dressed as the World Trade Center during the September 11 attacks. Images of the cosplay were widely shared on social media sites as Facebook, Reddit, and Twitter. Bleeding Cool's Rich Johnston speculated they were cosplaying as the game Rampage, while Facebook commenters drew a connection with the anime Terror in Resonance.

== Australian adaptation ==
In 2016, Nine's 9Go! channel launched an Australian Adult Swim block and acquired the local format rights to FishCentre, which introduced the block each week. Unlike the American version of FishCenter, FishCentre was not live and consisted of scripted shorts no longer than 2 minutes in length, with voices super-imposed onto the fish. It ran for 12 episodes.
