= Gēmusetto =

American adult animated series

- Also known as: Gēmusetto Machu Picchu (season 1); Gēmusetto: Death Beat(s) (season 2)
- Genre: Adult animation; Surreal comedy; Anime Parody
- Created by: Max Simonet
- Based on: Dave & the Crossword-Guys by Matt Harrigan
- Written by: Max Simonet
- Directed by: Max Simonet
- Voices of: Max Simonet; Tynan Humphrey; Emily Myers; Benjamin Rivera; Angela Payne; Rebecca Shenfeld; Kelvin Taylor
- Country of origin: United States
- Original language: English
- No. of seasons: 2
- No. of episodes: 20

Production
- Executive producers: Keith Crofford; Mike Lazzo; Ashley Kohler (Note: Executive Producer for Awesome, Inc.)
- Producer: Melissa Warrenburg
- Editor: Maxime Simonet
- Running time: 44–46 minutes (episodes 1–5); 33 minutes (episode 6); 11 minutes (season 2)
- Production companies: Awesome Inc. Williams Street

Original release
- Network: Adult Swim (season 1); Toonami (season 2)
- Release: April 1, 2019 – December 21, 2020

Related
- FishCenter Live; Tender Touches

Gēmusetto (stylized as ゲームセット) is an American adult animated series created by Max Simonet, that premiered on April 1, 2019 on Adult Swim. The first season, titled Gēmusetto Machu Picchu (stylized as ゲ–ムセット Machu Picchu), follows the exploits of Makasu, a sportsman and relic thief, who constantly challenges the gods of several different religions for their relics, and his companion Back Pocket Dimension Flying Bear, on their quest to gain the treasures of the Inca-gods all the while he is chased by Bendy Rivers, a member of Interpol tasked with stopping Makasu.

The first season parodies anime-style shows, intentionally using rather strange and amateurish animation, constantly shifting quality in drawing-style, as well as rather off-beat and crass humor. The program also features several other segments in between "episodes" and parts such as alternate openings for each part, educational material regarding the different Inca-gods, flashback-segments of past challenges Makasu has faced, and fake toy-commercials promoting the program.

The series was renewed for a 14-episode second season, titled Gēmusetto: Death Beat(s) (stylized as ゲームセッ2 death beat(s)), which premiered on November 8, 2020 on Adult Swim's Toonami programming block. The second season was first revealed on April 1, 2020, as a brief clip of the season premiere was shown before leading into the night's April Fools prank. This season has a more conventional 11-minute runtime per episode as part of the Toonami block.

== Broadcast and release ==
All six episodes of the first season were aired over the course of six hours on the early morning of April 1, 2019 as part of Adult Swim's annual April Fools prank. The series' existence had only been discussed on Adult Swim's live streaming programs (mainly Bloodfeast, where the original shorts had debuted) and had not received any kind of official announcement prior to the debut. Adult Swim added each episode to their website the following day, and soon after to their YouTube channel in the form of a four-hour-and-fourteen-minute movie. The network has reran the first season since, albeit split up into 11 half-hour episodes.

The series' debut was also simulcast on the Canadian cable network Action, which was already scheduled to become an Adult Swim-branded channel later that morning at 6:00 a.m.

The second season was initially announced on April 1, 2020, with the cold open and intro to episode 1 airing as the start of Adult Swim's April Fools prank. The intro, however, would be interrupted by Post Malone, leading into the actual prank for the night, three-and-a-half hours of sneak peeks. A press release confirmed the second season's existence, with a release date set for the fall. Creator Max Simonet originally confirmed a September 25, 2020 release date on the Adult Swim Podcast. However, the series was delayed to November 7, 2020 at 2 a.m. ET/PT (effectively November 8), airing as part of Adult Swim's Toonami programming block. Following a sudden schedule change on December 19, 2020 (effectively December 20) to air Wonder Woman: Bloodlines and Justice League: The New Frontier, the final four episodes of the season were pushed off the Toonami block and aired the next day, though these four episodes would later rerun on Toonami in January 2021.

== Episodes ==
=== Series overview ===
Season	Episodes	Originally released		Season title
Season	Episodes	First released	Last released	Season title
1	6	April 1, 2019		Machu Picchu
2	14	November 8, 2020	December 21, 2020	Death Beat(s)

=== Season 1: Gēmusetto Machu Picchu (2019) ===
No. overall	No. in season	Title	Original release date	US viewers (millions)
1	1	"Chapter 1: Your Serve"	April 1, 2019	0.56
The story starts with a flashforward, showing a heavily-wounded Makasu floating in space, close to the Sun, with the sun declaring that it is Makasu's serve. The story then jumps back to Makasu, traveling up Machu Picchu, as he uses a rod to transform the ruins and summon the God of Tennis. God of Tennis expected the mortal's arrival and knew of his reputation as a deity-defeating treasure thief who gets away with his crimes. Instead of stopping him, however, God of Tennis offers his services to Makasu – since he must defeat the Inca Gods in tennis – claiming the gods are shadows of their former selves. Makasu has strong reservations towards tennis due to an accident involving his grandfather, but God of Tennis snaps Makasu out of it after telling his own story of how the Inca Gods took him in after the French Pantheon of Gods fell. Makasu feels ready to take on the gods after training, and escapes agent Bendy Rivers, who has been trying to arrest him. Makasu and God of Tennis reach the land of Ekeko, Makasu's first opponent, meeting the match overseer Chair Umpire before the match commences. Ekeko initially gains the upper hand due to his ability to summon any gift – including tennis rackets and tennis balls – and pompously hints he will give Makasu a shirt that says "Big Tennis Loser". However, Makasu uses Reverse psychology to create a Fractal gift of Ekeko wearing the shirt, leading to Ekeko's desires to grant the gift, sapping him of his power. Makasu easily defeats Ekeko, who strangely is then absorbed into Makasu following his defeat. Chair Umpire then advises Makasu that this isn't normal, and that things will only get harder.
2	2	"Chapter 2: Second Set"	April 1, 2019	0.39
Reaching the beach, God of Tennis tells Makasu that their next challenger is in the Sea. However, as they relax on the beach for a moment's respite, Bendy Rivers manages to use a trap laid for Makasu to contain him within a bubble. However, before Bendy Rivers can arrest him once more, Makasu has Back Pocket Dimension Flying Bear use Skíðblaðnir to break them out, crashing Bendy Rivers' flying machine in the process. After being attacked by a strange creature known as "the Tricky Colon", Makasu consumes it, causing the anger of Mama Qucha; Makasu and God of Tennis are brought to a dry bit of sea floor via whirlpool after Makasu is forced to vomit it back up. Chair Umpire then summons a tennis court for them to play on before Mama Qucha is summoned. Furious with Makasu's actions, she shows heavy hostility before their game starts, gaining an early lead by using balls of water for her tennis balls rather than normal ones. However, after a small break, he returns and manages to hit her balls back, having frozen vomit fill the holes in his racket, ultimately helping him defeat her and absorb her power. Being led to the "Under Andes" next by God of Tennis, they soon encounter Urcuchillay, who is furious about the group's treatment of llamas up to this point. Though initially mocked by the group due to his eccentric way of communication, he proves to be a challenging match for Makasu, though Makasu manages to defeat the god.
3	3	"Chapter 3: Back Spin"	April 1, 2019	0.33
Back at Interpol, they have lost track of Makasu after the tracker that they put on him ceases to function after his fight with Urcuchillay. However, detecting energy from the "Colored Stones of Nüwa", they plan for Bendy Rivers to intercept him. God of Tennis and Makasu manage to reach Ukhu Pacha. After a delay from Chair Umpire taking a call, Makasu faces off against Supay. Though Makasu manages to get the upper hand early, Supay uses his large eyes to flood Makasu's mind with the knowledge of many people's deaths he unintentionally caused when he was in school, including the father of an infatuated girl, a tennis coach, a janitor capable of bending time to his will, a bully whom he stole the powers of, and the wife of a bocce ball teacher he was having an affair with. With Makasu now flooded with guilt, Supay starts scoring easy points on Makasu, who is too overcome with guilt to bother even hitting the ball back. However, God of Tennis intervenes by breaking Supay's glasses and revealing his eyes are actually quite small after breaking his glasses. This kills Supay, and his power is absorbed into Makasu.
4	4	"Chapter 4: Break Point"	April 1, 2019	N/A
Still quite shaken and upset from his encounter with Supay, Makasu finds it hard to put the knowledge of all the deaths he unintentionally caused behind him. To try and help him forget, God of Tennis brings Makasu to a bar. With the help of alcohol, he manages to suppress his feelings of guilt and defeat a regret demon trying to feed off him. During his hangover, Makasu is encountered by Chair Umpire, who informs them their next opponent is Kon. Kon taunts Makasu, and the two to glare constantly at each other; this allows for Kon to summon Catequil as backup. God of Tennis is angered, as he considers this unfair, but Chair Umpire allows it, meaning Makasu has to fight the two gods alone. Makasu, however, suggests that he and God of Tennis merge to increase their power. With the blessing of Chair Umpire, the two fuse together and become a powerful being. However, Kon is unfazed and also merges with Catequil to become a super being. Makasu and God of Tennis win after a hard-fought battle, but afterwards the two un-merge, battered and bruised from the stress the fusion put on their bodies. It is at this point that Bendy Rivers, now under orders to shoot Makasu on sight, manages to catch up with Makasu. He demands Makasu give him one reason to spare his life, and Makasu begs for forgiveness. This causes Bendy to go through an internal breakdown of his own motives and reflect on his past. This allows Makasu and God of Tennis to escape, as Bendy finally remembers Makasu is someone without remorse. At the same time, Bendy's wife divorces him, leaving him emotionally destroyed.
5	5	"Chapter 5: Foot Fault"	April 1, 2019	N/A
Makasu discusses recent concerns about how his challenges have been going this time around, specifically how he has been absorbing the power of all the gods they've fought up to this point. However, these concerns fall on deaf ears; God of Tennis is too busy and tells him to just repress everything and keep focused. They reach Hanan Pacha, finding a strange hotel there that God of Tennis does not recall. However, they put this feeling aside for now and enjoy the hot springs to relax and revitalize their muscles. Females of many different types (and one disguised Bendy Rivers), alongside a ventriloquist, start trying to woo Makasu and convince him to give up his quest. Makasu is gradually surrounded by attractive ladies, causing him to flee and run into the ventriloquist. The ventriloquist reveals he has little to actually do with this – he was hired to sing for him and says that the hotel seemingly appeared only a day prior. As he continues to flee, Makasu discovers that all the women were artificially made by normal meats. Here, Bendy reveals himself and how he managed to sneak in with the plan of catching him. However, they are interrupted by Mama Killa, the mastermind behind the fake women and the hotel. Mama Killa shows great hostility toward Makasu for the killing of Kon, though Makasu seems to care little. Mama Killa's "star child" within her gives Makasu trouble at first; however, using some quick thinking, he switches the ball with the Sessho-seki, killing the Star Child when it tries to return the volley. Makasu then uses this opportunity to steal Mama Killa's fertility, transforming himself into a woman and killing Mama Killa. Bendy finally confronts Makasu once more, frustrated that he can never catch Makasu and finally admits defeat, asking God of Tennis to be sent back to Earth as he finally reconciles with his wife to prevent the divorce.
6	6	"Chapter 6: Match Point"	April 1, 2019	N/A
Reaching "The Place", Makasu and God of Tennis prepare for their fight against Viracocha. When they reach Viracocha, they see he seems to have trouble hearing, seeing, and even moving, seeming quite senile from age. Starting with his serve, Viracocha starts the match. However, Viracocha's movements are so slow that Makasu falls asleep, initiating the "Nap Clause". Makasu, now allowed to use weaponry against Viracocha, chooses to use the Mmaagha Kamalu, a weapon that glows red when evil is nearby. Using its power, Makasu manages to kill Viracocha. However, Makasu notices the sword is still glowing red despite Viracocha being dead, concluding he was the evil one. This, combined with the paranoia Makasu has developed, leads to Makasu leaving God of Tennis and Back Pocket Dimension Flying Bear behind. Makasu finally reaches Inti; however, he finds himself in an empty white room, only accompanied by the Chair Umpire. Chair Umpire explains that while they're at Inti, Inti "isn't there". Makasu questions Chair Umpire about God of Tennis, only for Chair Umpire to reveal that there is no French Pantheon of Gods or a "God of Tennis". God of Tennis appears behind him and finally reveals that he is actually a living puppet controlled by Inti, God of the Sun. Here, Inti finally reveals his motives. Just like the others, Inti was slowly dying; however, to prevent that, he injected Makasu with a spell that would have him absorb the other gods. This would ensure that when he eventually reached Inti, he'd have enough power to rekindle Inti, ensuring Inti's prolonged existence. Taking Makasu into space, Inti starts to burn Makasu up. Makasu attempts many tricks to avoid death, but Inti incinerates each one, including Back Pocket Dimension Flying Bear. In a final act of defiance, Makasu challenges Inti to tennis, diving toward Inti, which leads back toward the beginning. Makasu questions Inti; then, Inti declares that it's Makasu's serve and burns him alive.

=== Season 2: Gēmusetto: Death Beat(s) (2020) ===
No. overall	No. in season	Title	Original release date	US viewers (millions)
7	1	"Episode One: Asus4"	November 8, 2020	0.23
All-sinner and sportsman Makasu has recently died, but his death is causing the afterlives to converge and the universe is collapsing! Can the finger being Dr. Legs convince Makasu to be friend, his Piano Frog, and save existence?
8	2	"Episode Two: A# Minor"	November 8, 2020	0.20
The jazz battle between Makasu and the Egyptian goddess Maat is deadlocked until the River Styx shoves Charon down her throat. Will the afterlife convergence cause two different religions to merge their Musical Battle Robots?
9	3	"Episode Three: B7+5"	November 15, 2020	0.26
Making their way through the Mesopotamian underworld of Kur, Dr. Legs and Makasu run into a formidable foe. Can a vengeful spirit who has a bone to pick with Makasu be more dangerous than a god?
10	4	"Episode Four: C Major"	November 15, 2020	0.26
Josie has been seething with rage towards Makasu ever since his own death - but is holding on to anger just a waste of time? Will their musical battle rip the afterlife of Kur apart?
11	5	"Episode Five: Db6"	November 22, 2020	0.24
To reach the Center of All Death, our heroes board a ferry that's attempting to navigate multiple mythological rivers. Who is more dangerous - some of the dead passengers, or the enigmatic Finnish psychopomp boat captain, Tytti?
12	6	"Episode Six: D7#9"	November 22, 2020	0.24
The ferry has crashed into the Inuit frozen underworld of Adlivun - but the Hindu death god Yama is waiting for them! Can Makasu escape the religious entities trying to judge his soul?
13	7	"Episode Seven: EbMaj7"	December 6, 2020	0.20
Tytti's boat docks in Diyu, the Chinese mythological Hell. It appears abandoned and godless, populated only by roaming bicycle-riding spirits who committed suicide. How dangerous is a hell with no management?
14	8	"Episode Eight: E9"	December 6, 2020	0.18
Makasu totally misconstrues all the friendship advice Dr. Legs has been giving him during his redemption arc. With our hero out of commission, do drastic measures have to be taken to save the universe?
15	9	"Episode Nine: Fdim"	December 13, 2020	0.27
Religions begin colliding and merging in the ground zero that is the ruins of Suicide Town. How does Makasu deal with jealousy when someone perfect comes to save them?
16	10	"Episode Ten: F#Min7"	December 13, 2020	0.25
Locked in their own illusionary nightmares, our heroes must find a way out of The Perfect Human's torment. But how do you taunt a man who already hates himself half the time?
17	11	"Episode Eleven: G"	December 21, 2020	0.23
18	12	"Episode Twelve: Ab7"	December 21, 2020	0.22
19	13	"Episode Thirteen: Play to D.C. Al Coda"	December 21, 2020	0.20
20	14	"Episode Fourteen: Al Fine"	December 21, 2020	0.19

== See also ==
- List of adult animated television series
- List of animated television series of 2019
- List of programs broadcast by Adult Swim
- Perfect Hair Forever, another anime parody series produced by Williams Street
