= Dave Bonawits =

American actor

- Known for: FishCenter Live
- Opponent: Boris

Dave Bonawits (or David Bonawits) is an American actor, filmmaker, and editor. He was one of the hosts of FishCenter Live, from the show's start on Adult Swim's website in 2014 to its cancellation in 2020.

== Career ==
Bonawits directed Pleasant People (2011). In 2011, Pleasant People had its world premiere at the 2011 Slamdance Film Festival. He also edited the 2015 film Female Pervert. He is also Jiyoung Lee's creative partner.

While working at Adult Swim, he hosted the American web television series FishCenter Live alongside Andrew Choe, Matt Harrigan, Christina Loranger, and Max Simonet. The show ran from 2014 to 2020, ending following layoffs, which included Dave. During that time, Dave Bonawits also hosted a crossword solving show with Max Simonet for Adult Swim from 2015 to 2020, which later became known as Bloodfeast. Bloodfeast later received two animated television spin-offs, Tender Touches and Gēmusetto, with Dave co-creating the former and voice acting in both.

Bonawits is also the bassist for the band Antbrain.

== Filmography ==
Year	Title	Role	Notes
2008	Pleasant People	Camera operator, cinematographer, digital effects, director, editor, producer, sound editor, writer	
2010	Everything Is in Everything	Camera operator, cinematographer, sound editor/sound mixer	
2010	I Remember Dying on Halloween	Actor	
2010	Please Please Pick Up	Cinematographer, editor, sound editor	
2011	Egg in Pig's Ear	Cinematographer	
2011	Pleasant People	Director, Executive Producer, Writer	
2011	Satanic Panic: Band Out of Hell	Actor (Conflicted Male)	
2013	The Allergic Reaction	Director, writer	
2013	Moral Sleeze	Assistant Editor, Cinematographer	
2014-2020	FishCenter Live	Host	
2014	Satanic Panic 2: Battle of the Bands	Actor (Connie TV Show Cameraman), Cinematographer	
2014	Westbound	Cinematographer, editor	
2014	Yoga Bro	Cinematographer	
2015	Female Pervert	Editor	
2017-2020	Tender Touches	Actor (Curtis), Co-creator	
2019–2020	Gēmusetto	Actor, composer	

== See also ==
- List of talk show hosts
