= Tender Touches =

American adult animated series

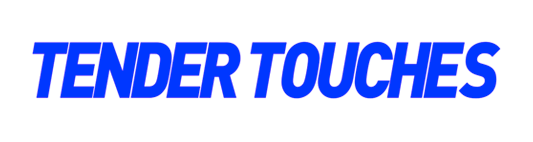
- Created by: David Bonawits; Lauren Payne; Maxime Simonet
- Based on: Dave & The Crossword Guys by Matt Harrigan
- Voices of: David Bonawits; Bradley Millner; Maxime Simonet
- Country of origin: United States
- Original language: English
- No. of seasons: 3
- No. of episodes: 15

Production
- Executive producers: Matt Harrigan; Mike Lazzo; Keith Crofford
- Production company: Williams Street

Original release
- Network: Adult Swim
- Release: December 18, 2017 – June 19, 2020

Related
- FishCenter Live

Tender Touches is an American adult animated series created by David Bonawits, Lauren Payne and Maxime Simonet for Cartoon Network's nighttime programming block Adult Swim. It aired from December 18, 2017 to June 19, 2020.

== Background ==
The series is a parody of soap operas and was based on a segment from Bloodfeast created by hosts Dave Bonawits and Maxime Simonet of FishCenter Live fame. It was introduced in 2017 at a showcase of Adult Swim pilots as part of their "On The Green" tour across the United States.

For the first two seasons, the series included two versions of each episode. One was the regular episode, and the other was a musical. Starting with the third season, the musical version of the episode was discontinued. The series is characterized by improvisation, inconsistent audio and voice-acting quality, and numerous fourth wall breaks.

== Episodes ==
=== Series overview ===
Season	Episodes	Originally aired	
Season	Episodes	First aired	Last aired
1	7.5	December 18, 2017	December 22, 2017
2	7.5	November 26, 2018	November 30, 2018
3	5	June 15, 2020	June 19, 2020

=== Season 1 (2017) ===
No. overall	No. in season	Title	Original release date	Prod. code	US viewers (millions)
1	1	"Heated Floors"	December 18, 2017	1.0	0.729
Steve (Maxime Simonet) and Charlene (Bradley "Bwadley" Millner) are holding hands when Steve asks why Charlene's hand is shaking. Charlene explains that she is nervous by the thought of Curtis (David Bonawits) returning home early. However, Curtis does so and is taken aback by the sight of his brother Steve cheating with his girlfriend Charlene. While Steve defends why he is undressed by relating how he needed help applying a massage oil, Curtis interrogates the two. Steve remains defensive, while Charlene reveals the truth. Upon this epiphany, Curtis goes to his car to cry and contemplates his next plan: murdering Steve by a long knife stabbed through his heart. Returning to the living room, Curtis wields the long knife and exacts his revenge against his brother's betrayal, but decides to save his brother
1.5	1.5	"Heated Floors: Operetta"	December 18, 2017	1.5	0.630
A musical version of the previous episode "Heated Floors".
2	2	"Bamboo Floors"	December 19, 2017	2	0.783
Curtis is stuck in the middle of traffic en route to the hospital while Charlene tends to Steve whose organs remain loose. Frustrated at both the traffic and Steve's bleeding, Curtis vents about the Dodge Shadow ahead of them. Despite the trying situation, Curtis tries to console Steve with a rendition of a Gwen Stefani song. Brought to the hospital, Steve lies on a "luxury gurney" and talks with Curtis about their predicament. Meanwhile, Charlene goes by the vending machine for a churro and a coffee. Dr. Bysmol (Lauren Payne) shows up and assesses Steve's medical dilemma. Curtis explains how the dilemma arose, while Steve is placed in a hospital bed. Steve is given a milk transfusion and gets poisoned and dies, Dr. Bysmol asks Charlene to kill her brother as she killed steve and Charlene accepts. meanwhile, Curtis has to leave given a housing prospect for a prospective young couple.
2.5	2.5	"Bamboo Floors: Operetta"	December 19, 2017	2.5	0.676
The musical version of "Bamboo Floors"
3	3	"Train Floors"	December 20, 2017	3	0.826
Curtis stands trial for the death of Steve as a blind Steve enters and makes the Judge send Curtis to prison for injuring, in the prison cell, the Blind Steve confronts Curtis, but Curtis discovers that this Steve is actually two goats. Meanwhile, Charlene is on a train with Dr. Bysmol's brother, where the birds kill him and she is framed and sent to prison the cell opposite to Curtis.
3.5	3.5	"Train Floors: Operetta"	December 20, 2017	3.5	0.685
The musical version of "Train Floors"
4	4	"Dormitory Floors"	December 21, 2017	4	0.911
A flashback episode relating how Curtis and Charlene met and their mutual friend, Ratman and his wife Charlene. In the present, Curtis attends prison therapy. Meanwhile, Charlene kills Dr. Bismol. It's revealed that Ratman and Judge are brothers and planned to replace Steve with two goats to also they have the real Steve who is alive and well.
4.5	4.5	"Dormitory Floors: Operetta"	December 21, 2017	4.5	0.737
The musical encore of "Dormitory Floors"
5	5	"Monodecathedron Floors"	December 22, 2017	5	0.759
Conspiracies and revelations help a blind Steve escape the goat farm and see the truth.
5.5	5.5	"Monodecathedron Floors: Operetta"	December 22, 2017	5.5	0.647
The musical encore of "Monodecathedron Floors"

=== Season 2 (2018) ===
No. overall	No. in season	Title	Original release date	Prod. code	US viewers (millions)
6	1	"She's All We Had"	November 26, 2018	6.0	0.685
Mother dies and Steve inherits the family's colonial villa
6.5	1.5	"She's All We Had: Operetta"	November 26, 2018	6.5	0.598
A musical version of the previous episode "She's All We Had".
7	2	"Nude Bidet Ha-Ha Spray"	November 27, 2018	7	0.730
A forgotten sibling appears with legally binding skin and Charlene needs skin cream.
7.5	2.5	"Nude Bidet Ha-Ha Spray: Operetta"	November 27, 2018	7.5	0.622
The musical version of "Nude Bidet Ha-Ha Spray"
8	3	"Everything Is Ugly"	November 28, 2018	8	0.711
In this sexy strip club episode, Curtis nearly drowns in his depression, but this time in song!
8.5	3.5	"Everything Is Ugly: Operetta"	November 28, 2018	8.5	0.606
The musical version of "Everything Is Ugly"
9	4	"Breakup Cake"	November 29, 2018	9	0.579
Charlene needs to solve the pig mermaid puzzle to save the family
9.5	4.5	"Breakup Cake: Operetta"	November 29, 2018	9.5	0.525
The musical encore of "Breakup Cake"
10	5	"Holding Hands Until We Die"	November 30, 2018	10	0.530
Verna leads the family underground to accomplish her deadly schemes
10.5	5.5	"Holding Hands Until We Die: Operetta"	November 30, 2018	10.5	0.503
The musical encore of "Holding Hands Until We Die"

=== Season 3 (2020) ===
No. overall	No. in season	Title	Original release date	Prod. code	US viewers (millions)
11	1	"That's A Wrap"	June 15, 2020 (Note: This episode had an advanced stealth premiere on April 1, 2020 as part of Adult Swim’s annual April Fools' stunt.)	TBA	0.522
12	2	"Foods of the World"	June 16, 2020	TBA	0.442
13	3	"Microecosystems"	June 17, 2020	TBA	0.490
14	4	"Rock and Roll Guys"	June 18, 2020	TBA	0.452
15	5	"The End of the World Concert"	June 19, 2020	TBA	0.433

== Broadcast and release ==
Season	Time slot (ET)
2017–18	Weekdays at 12:30 am (episodes 1, 2, 3, 4, 5); Weekdays at 12:45 am (episodes 1.5, 2.5, 3.5, 4.5, 5.5)
2020	Weekdays at 12:00 am

=== Nielsen ratings ===
Season	Episodes	Originally released		Viewers (millions)	Rank
Season	Episodes	First released	Last released	Viewers (millions)	Rank
1	5	December 18, 2017	December 22, 2017	0.729	18
2	5	November 26, 2018	November 30, 2018	TBA	TBA
3	5	March 31, 2020	June 19, 2020	TBA	TBA

The first episode "Heated Floors" was watched by 0.729 million viewers on its first broadcast on Adult Swim and "Heated Floors: Operetta" was watched by 0.63 million viewers. On Thursday, 21 December 2017, Tender Touches ranked third in the Top 3 after NBA basketball with 911,000 viewers.

== Reception ==
Geek's Jose Rodriguez praised the show with "holy crap this show is hilarious [...] [I]t's exactly the kind of offbeat, disturbing, and hilarious show that Adult Swim used to make. Bubbleblabber's John Schwarz reviewed Tender Touches favorably, saying "you're in for a real surprise."

== See also ==
- List of adult animated television series
- List of animated television series of 2017
- List of programs broadcast by Adult Swim
