= Adult Swim =

American cable network

- Logo used since May 25, 2003
- Type: Programming block
- Country: United States
- Broadcast area: Nationwide
- Network: Cartoon Network (Note: Daily: 5 p.m. – 6 a.m. ET/PT)
- Headquarters: 1065 Williams Street NW, Atlanta, Georgia, U.S.

Programming
- Language: English; Spanish (Note: via SAP, a Spanish language simulcast of the channel is also available)
- Picture format: 1080i (HDTV) (Downscaled to letterboxed 480i for the SDTV feed)

Ownership
- Owner: Skydance
- Parent: The Cartoon Network, Inc.
- Key people: Mike Lazzo; Keith Crofford; Khaki Jones; Betty Cohen; Jason DeMarco; Michael Ouweleen
- Sister channels: List: Boomerang; Cartoon Network; Cartoonito; Discovery Familia; Discovery Family

History
- Launched: September 2, 2001; 25 years ago
- Founder: Mike Lazzo

Links
- Webcast: Live Simulcast (Note: Available nightly during block's duration as listed above; U.S. pay-TV subscribers only)
- Website: www.adultswim.com

Availability (Nighttime programming block of Cartoon Network)

Streaming media
- Affiliated streaming service: HBO Max
- Livestream services: DirecTV Stream, Hulu + Live TV, Sling TV, Spectrum TV Stream, YouTube TV

Adult Swim (AS; stylized as [adult swim] and [as]) is an American adult-oriented television programming block on Cartoon Network which broadcasts during the evening, prime time, and late-night dayparts. The channel features stylistically varied animated and live-action series targeting an adult audience. The block's content includes original programming, particularly comedies and action series, syndicated series, and short films with generally minimal or no editing for content. Adult Swim is programmed by Williams Street, a subsidiary of The Cartoon Network, Inc. that also produces much of the block's original programming.

Launched on September 2, 2001, Adult Swim has frequently aired animated sitcoms, adult animation features, parody, satires, mockumentaries, sketch comedy, and pilots, with many of its programs being aesthetically experimental, transgressive, improvised, and surrealist in nature. Adult Swim has contracted with various studios known for their productions in absurd and shock comedy. In addition to comedy, Adult Swim also broadcasts Japanese anime and American action animation, and since May 2012 this type of programming has generally been aired on its Saturday night Toonami block, which itself is a relaunch of the original block of the same name that ran on Cartoon Network from March 1997 to September 2008. Adult Swim operated a video game division known as Adult Swim Games through 2026, which also published indie games not based on the block's original programming from 2011 to 2024.

When Adult Swim launched, it initially ran in the late night hours. It began to expand into prime time in 2008, and moved its start time to 8:00 p.m. ET/PT in 2014. To take advantage of adult viewership of Cartoon Network in the daypart, Adult Swim expanded further to 7:00 p.m. on weekdays and Saturdays beginning in May 2023. After experiencing success with the changes, Adult Swim further expanded to 5:00 p.m. beginning on August 28, 2023, eclipsing Cartoon Network in daily runtime; the extension has primarily been used for a sub-block known as Checkered Past, which features classic Cartoon Network original series.

Due to its differing demographics, Adult Swim is usually promoted by The Cartoon Network, Inc. as being a separate network time-sharing with Cartoon Network on its channel allotments, with its viewership being measured separately by Nielsen from the youth-oriented daytime and afternoon programming carried under the Cartoon Network branding.

== History ==
=== Creation and development (1994–2001) ===
Cartoon Network's original head programmer, Mike Lazzo, conceived Adult Swim. The block grew out of Cartoon Network's previous attempts at airing content appropriate for adults who might be watching the channel after 11 pm (ET/PT). The network began experimenting with its late-night programming by airing anthology shows that presented uncensored classic cartoon shorts, such as ToonHeads, The Bob Clampett Show, The Tex Avery Show, Late Night Black and White, and O Canada. Another block, Toonami's "Midnight Run", aired the network's action programming uncut with minimal edits. At that time, one third of Cartoon Network's audience were adults.

During the 1990s, prime time animation geared toward adults started growing popular due to the success of Fox's hit show The Simpsons. This was followed by a trend of other adult-oriented animated shows throughout the decade, as well as more general-oriented animated series which received strong adult followings. Space Ghost Coast to Coast, Cartoon Network's first foray into original programming, was created in 1994 specifically for late-night adult audiences. The series was created by Mike Lazzo's Ghost Planet Industries, which eventually became Williams Street, the producers and programmers of Adult Swim.

Between 4:00 and 5:00 a.m. on December 21, and December 30, 2000 (while Space Ghost Coast to Coast was on hiatus), several new Williams Street series made unannounced "stealth" premieres. Sealab 2021; Harvey Birdman, Attorney at Law; Aqua Teen Hunger Force; and The Brak Show all premiered unannounced; the official schedules listed the shows as "Special Programming". Prior to that, in Entertainment Weekly, it was stated that Michael Ouweleen's next project was working on the Harvey Birdman, Attorney at Law Pilot with J. J. Sedelmaier. In a 1999 interview, the indie pop rock band Calamine stated they had recorded the theme song for Sealab 2021. While entertaining pitches for a variety of adult cartoons, Lazzo realized the potential for packaging them as a complete adult-focused block. Different names were considered, "Parental Warning" and "Parental Block", but he eventually settled on "Adult Swim" (a reference to the common policy at public swimming pools to have time intervals during the day when only adults are allowed in the pool).

Cartoon Network originally intended to launch the adult animation block on April 1, 2001, but it was delayed five months. In June 2001, TV Guide had recorded an interview with Cartoon Network's former president, Betty Cohen. She stated there was a new programming block coming out in September that was aimed for an adult audience. During the Toyota Comedy Festival in New York, Cartoon Network held a free "Cartoon Network Confidential" screening. The event featured "Kentucky Nightmare" (Space Ghost Coast to Coast), several "stealth" pilots, Captain Linger, and an episode of Home Movies. On Saturday, July 21, 2001, the Space Ghost Coast to Coast panel at San Diego Comic-Con had a trivia game in which the winners won a promotional CD that had the theme songs to the upcoming Adult Swim Shows. Everybody who attended got a free Adult Swim t-shirt that was packaged to look like a roll of bandages that a lifeguard might carry.

At San Diego Comic-Con, audiences got to see clips of the upcoming shows and vote for what show they wanted to see as a sneak peek. Harvey Birdman, Attorney at Law was the winner and the pilot was screened. The Leave It to Brak episode "Mr. Bawk Ba Gawk" and Space Ghost Coast to Coast episode "The Justice Hole" were also screened, as well as clips to the episode "Sweet for Brak". On August 12, the first commercial advertising the new block aired on Cartoon Network. Around this time a press kit came out that featured towels and a promotional CD. Another press kit that was designed as a first aid kit came with a promo VHS with info on all the shows. Access Hollywood also highlighted the upcoming premieres. Print ads were shown in an August issue of Entertainment Weekly. On August 31, adultswim.com officially launched.

=== 2001–2003 ===
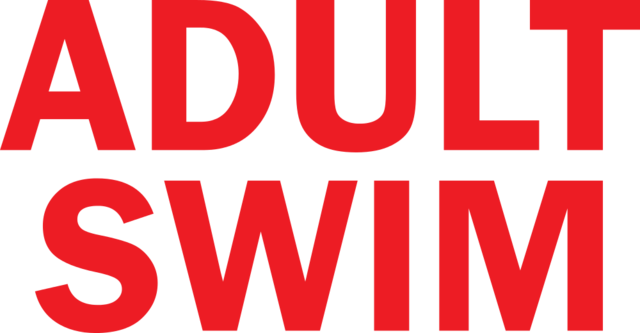
The first Adult Swim logo, used from September 2, 2001, to February 23, 2002

"Warning swimmers! We've got some potential violence, some strong language, coming up, and uh...some adult situations. No kids in the pool, all kids under 17 out...for Adult Swim."

— One of Adult Swim's initial parental advisory warnings.

Adult Swim officially launched on September 2, 2001, at 10 p.m. ET, with the original debut airing of the Home Movies episode "Director's Cut", which had been shelved before airing on its original network, UPN. According to Linda Simensky, "We had a bunch of episodes to screen for Mike Lazzo and by only the second episode, he yelled, "Buy it!"" Cartoon Network bought the original five UPN episodes and ordered eight more to complete the season. The series' first season was animated in Squigglevision; later seasons were done in Flash animation. The first anime broadcast on the block also aired on the night of its launch, Cowboy Bebop. Aqua Teen Hunger Force debuted on the block on September 9, with the episode "Escape from Leprechaupolis". The block initially aired on Sunday nights from 10:00 pm to 1:00 am ET, with a repeat of the same block on Thursday nights.

Adult Swim's original bumpers shown in-between the shows featured footage of public pools and elderly people visiting them, swimming, eating, exercising, and doing other pool-related activities. Some of these bumpers were narrated by a lifeguard who spoke through a megaphone, most notably shouting "all kids out of the pool". The logo was the words "Adult Swim" in all capital letters, often appearing during a freeze frame of the footage; an alternate variant featured the block's name in all-lowercase red letters inside a black circle with a yellow penumbra. The block's original theme music, titled "D-Code," was a remix of "Mambo Gallego" done by the Melbourne musician Dust Devil, originally played by Latin jazz musician Tito Puente.

Some of the bumps on the block included Aquaman Dance Party that featured Super Friends character Aquaman dancing in front of live action landfill footage, Captain Linger, a series of shorts created by J. J. Sedelmaier, Watering Hole, a series of shorts about animals talking in a bar created by Soup2Nuts, 1960s Hanna-Barbera action cartoons dubbed with the voices of children, a series of shorts called Not for Air that had the speech of Hanna-Barbera characters bleeped to make it seem like the characters were swearing, The New Adventures of The Wonder Twins, What They're Really Thinking, which had a voice narrate a character's thoughts in a comedic way, and Brak Puppet Party, a puppet show featuring classic Hanna-Barbera characters.

Commercials starring characters from Aqua Teen Hunger Force, The Brak Show, Space Ghost Coast to Coast, Harvey Birdman, Attorney At Law, and Sealab 2021 started to appear as well, such as 1-800-CALL-ATT, Nestea, Dr Pepper, Coca-Cola, Dodge Ram, Quizno's Sub, Maximum Hair Dye, Verizon Wireless, and movie promos for Austin Powers in Goldmember, Kung Pow! Enter the Fist, Jackass: The Movie, Eight Legged Freaks, and The Powerpuff Girls Movie. Brak would also host a segment called Adult Swim News. Due to the September 11 attacks days after the launch, episodes of Harvey Birdman, Attorney at Law, Cowboy Bebop, and Aqua Teen Hunger Force were delayed. In the winter of 2001 another Adult Swim CD was made available for free to anyone who purchased issue 28 of Hitch Magazine and the same CD came with issue 29.

When the Saturday night block debuted on February 23, 2002, it was known as Adult Swim Action, with various anime programs displayed on the block from 11:00 pm to 2:00 am ET. Thus, programming on the block was divided between Adult Swim Action and Adult Swim Comedy. Adult Swim Comedy was Sunday nights and ran from 10:00 pm to 1:00 am ET. Two days prior, on February 21, Adult Swim stopped airing on Thursday nights. The Rocky and Bullwinkle Show and The Popeye Show took Cowboy Bebop's place for 12:00 am and 12:30 am ET. On June 15, 2002, Adult Swim had their first contest called "Adult Swim Happiness Sweepstakes" where winners could win a Master Shake air freshener.

Second logo of Adult Swim, used from February 23, 2002, to May 25, 2003

It became increasingly common for Adult Swim to act as a home for reruns of animated series that had been canceled prematurely including Home Movies, Baby Blues, Mission Hill, The Oblongs, The Ripping Friends, Futurama, Family Guy, and God, the Devil and Bob, as well as burn off remaining episodes of said shows that never aired on their original networks, as a result of their premature cancellation. The block obtained Futurama's exclusive pay-TV syndication rights in September 2002 for a reported $10 million, and the series first aired on the network on January 12, 2003. Family Guy made its debut on April 20 of that year with the episode "Brian in Love", and immediately became the block's top-rated program, dominating late night viewing in its time period vs. pay-television and free-to-air competition and boosting viewership of both the block, and Cartoon Network itself, by 239 percent. Seth MacFarlane had previously created Larry & Steve, a cartoon predecessor to Family Guy, that was aired on Cartoon Network's What a Cartoon! Show in 1997. MacFarlane had also worked on several Cartoon Network shows, such as Johnny Bravo and Dexter's Laboratory.

On New Year's Eve 2002, Brak from The Brak Show and Carl Brutananadilewski from Aqua Teen Hunger Force hosted a New Year's Eve special from 11:00 pm to 3:00 am. This was the first time Adult Swim aired on a Tuesday night.

Beginning on January 12, 2003, Adult Swim was airing five nights a week, Sundays through Thursdays from 11:00 p.m. to 2:00 a.m. Saturday nights were dropped. On February 9, 2003, sister network TNT aired an "Adult Swim All Star Extravaganza" event following its coverage of the 2003 NBA All-Star Game, featuring airings of programs from the block. The event was considered a "sampler" to promote the block to a wider audience, with Jim Samples, then-general manager and executive vice president of Cartoon Network, remarking that "we think that if you like Shaq, you'll love Brak."

=== 2003–2012 ===
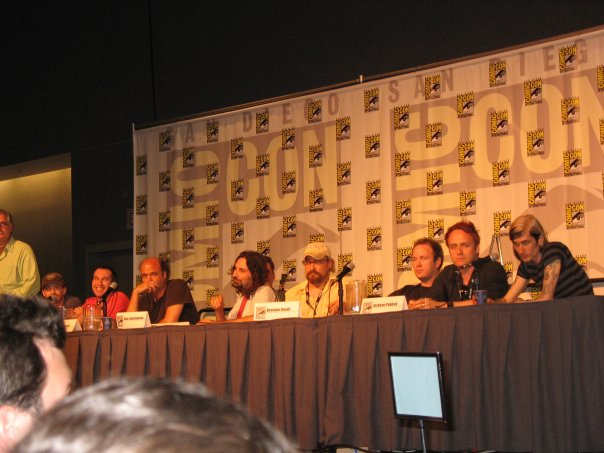
Several creators and writers of Adult Swim shows are shown on the 2006 San Diego Comic-Con Adult Swim panel; from left to right: Keith Crofford, Seth Green, Matthew Senreich, Scott Adsit, Dino Stamatopoulos, Tommy Blacha, Brendon Small, Jackson Publick, and Doc Hammer

Starting October 5, 2003, Adult Swim expanded three hours, ending at 5:00 a.m. ET. Adult Swim began airing on Saturday nights again beginning April 17, 2004. On July 19, 2004, Adult Swim had a publicity stunt telling viewers that they needed 1,000,000 people to go to their website so they could "Free Hockey Chicken". An employee was dressed as a chicken in front of a webcam being watched by viewers, and he could not leave the studio until they reached their goal. That same year Adult Swim hyped viewers by asking them to vote which would win in a fight: a "Flying Shark or a Flying Crocodile".

In late 2004, Adult Swim started a course at Kent State University with lessons by film professor Ron Russo, author of the book "Adult Swim and Comedy". On March 28, 2005, Atlanta-based Turner Broadcasting System began recording Adult Swim Nielsen ratings separately from Cartoon Network for demographic purposes. Promotions for Adult Swim are targeted towards the college age and those in their 20s and 30s, constituting the majority of their viewers. According to a September 1, 2004, article in Promo magazine, representatives travel to 30 universities across the U.S. to promote the Adult Swim lineup, including handing out posters for students' dorm rooms. On March 28, 2005, Adult Swim gained an extra hour, now ending at 6 a.m. ET. On October 2, 2005, Adult Swim regained the 10 p.m. hour on Sundays, continuing to start at 11 p.m. Mondays to Thursdays, and Saturdays.

Adult Swim had a direct and important role in the revival of Family Guy. Due to the series' popularity in reruns, the block burned off "When You Wish Upon a Weinstein", an episode of the series that had been banned from airing on Fox, in 2003. On March 29, 2004, less than one year after beginning reruns on Adult Swim, Fox announced it would be renewing Family Guy for a fourth season and reviving it from cancellation. Shortly after the announcement, Samples commented, "Bringing Family Guy to the Adult Swim lineup last April really helped turn the block into a cultural phenomenon with young adults."

Futurama was revived in 2007 by Comedy Central for similar reasons: impressive viewership in syndication as well as high DVD sales. In 2006, 20th Century Fox struck a deal to produce four direct-to-video animated features based on Futurama, and, in 2009, the series was revived in normal half-hour installments beginning in 2010 on Comedy Central. In a 2006 interview, Futurama creator Matt Groening explained "There's a long, regal history of misunderstood TV shows, and to Fox's credit, the studio looked at the ratings on the Cartoon Network and how the show does overseas, and saw that there was more money to be made." Before Adult Swim lost the rights to Futurama reruns, they aired an all-night marathon from December 26–30, 2007, with the final reruns airing on December 31, thus, marking Futurama's last airing on the block until 2021. On New Year's Eve 2005, Adult Swim had a countdown for the new year featuring characters from their shows. Beginning on March 27, 2006, Adult Swim's time began at 10:30 pm ET weekdays.

In 2007, Adult Swim announced it would expand to seven nights a week and begin airing on Fridays, starting July 6. On December 29, 2008, Adult Swim moved its start time to 10 p.m. ET every night, with reruns of King of the Hill being broadcast in the hour starting January 1, 2009. On December 27, 2010, Adult Swim moved its start time from 10 p.m. to 9 p.m. ET, extending the network's daily schedule to nine hours.

==== 2007 Boston Mooninite panic ====
On January 31, 2007, Adult Swim attracted national media attention as part of the 2007 Boston Mooninite panic. Both the Boston Police Department and the Boston Fire Department mistakenly identified battery-powered LED placards resembling The Mooninites, characters from Aqua Teen Hunger Force, as improvised explosive devices. The devices were in fact part of a guerrilla marketing campaign for the Aqua Teen Hunger Force Colon Movie Film for Theaters. The next day, Boston authorities arrested two men involved with the incident. Peter Berdovsky (a freelance video artist from Arlington, Massachusetts) and Sean Stevens were facing charges of placing a hoax device to incite panic, as well as one count of disorderly conduct, according to CNN.

On February 5, Turner Broadcasting and marketer Interference, Inc. announced that they would pay $2 million in amends: one million to the city of Boston, and one million in goodwill funds. Four days later, on February 9, Jim Samples, general manager and Executive Vice President of Cartoon Network since 2001, resigned. Turner Broadcasting later issued an apology for the ad campaign that caused the bomb scares. A statement emailed to The Boston Globe from Turner Broadcasting said:

"The 'packages' in question are magnetic lights that pose no danger. They are part of an outdoor marketing campaign in 10 cities in support of Adult Swim's animated television show Aqua Teen Hunger Force. They had been in place for two to three weeks in Boston, New York City, Los Angeles, Chicago, Houston, Atlanta, Seattle; Portland, Oregon; Austin, Texas; and San Francisco, and Philadelphia. Parent company Turner Broadcasting is in contact with local and federal law enforcement on the exact locations of the billboards. We regret that they were mistakenly thought to pose any danger."

=== 2012–2019 ===
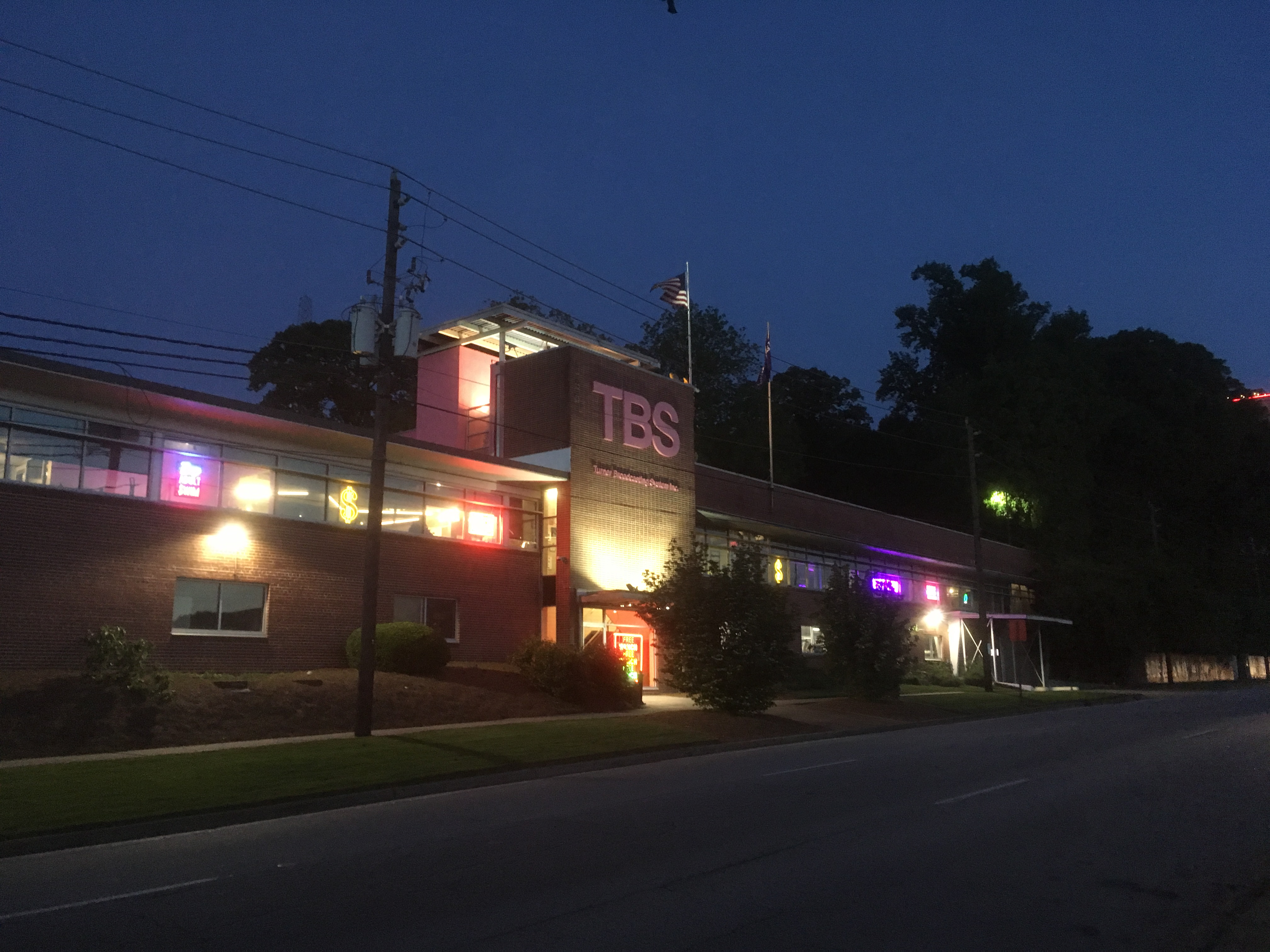
Adult Swim headquarters in Atlanta

On April 1, 2012, as part of their annual April Fools' Day stunt, Adult Swim revived Toonami, the defunct Cartoon Network programming block which primarily aired anime and action cartoons. Following positive reception, Toonami would return full-time as a rebrand of Adult Swim's Saturday night action block on May 26, 2012. From November 11 to December 29, 2013, Cartoon Network briefly regained the 9 p.m. ET hour, promoting it as a bonus "gift time" hour, shortening Adult Swim back to eight hours.

On March 31, 2014, Adult Swim's start time moved up to 8:00 p.m. ET, further extending its nightly schedule to ten hours. From 2015 to 2022, excluding 2017, Cartoon Network would take back the 8:00 p.m. hour anytime between late September and late December, making Adult Swim start at 9:00 p.m. again. In 2015, Adult Swim launched The Virtual Brainload, the first animated VR experience from a TV network.

On May 7, 2015, it was announced that Adult Swim had ordered an untitled pilot by Million Dollar Extreme described as a "sketch show in an almost present day post apocalyptic nightmare world". Based on that pilot, it was announced on March 3, 2016, that it would go to series with the group presenting it under the additional subtitle World Peace, with the first season consisting of six episodes in Adult Swim's traditional eleven-minute episode format. While the show did not predominantly deal with political themes, Sam Hyde's Twitter feed contained political references that have been characterized as alt-right. BuzzFeed News writer Joseph Bernstein wrote that a source told him Adult Swim's standards department repeatedly discovered and removed coded racist messages, including hidden swastikas. Additional sources at Adult Swim claimed to have filed internal complaints about dog-whistling in the show and harassment from Hyde and his fans. Adult Swim series creator Brett Gelman condemned the show as "an instrument of hate". Adult Swim announced on December 5, 2016, that it would not be renewed for a second season. When asked about the cancellation, Hyde stated that Adult Swim executives had expressed interest in picking up the show for a second season, but Turner Broadcasting ultimately decided to cancel the show.

On September 28, 2017, Pete Smith, a long-time producer at the studio and co-creator of The Brak Show, retired from the company. On that night, Adult Swim celebrated his career with an all-night marathon of Bob's Burgers (consisting of episodes that his daughter, Nora Smith, wrote) and The Brak Show, with promos and bumpers made by Pete Smith airing during breaks. This became an annual event through 2024, running anywhere from 1 hour to 10 hours. The following events also added newly produced shorts, interstitials from Cartoon Planet which Pete wrote for, and episodes of Squidbillies where Smith played the character Boyd.

Adult Swim began losing the syndication rights to various 20th Television animated series in 2018; Comedy Central acquired the syndication rights to King of the Hill and The Cleveland Show that year. On April 8, 2019, it was announced that FXX would acquire the rights to season 16 and beyond of Family Guy (sharing those rights with sister networks Freeform and FX) and season 9 and beyond of Bob's Burgers, with rights to the seasons airing on Adult Swim and sister network TBS at the time initially planned to transfer over to the Disney-owned networks in the coming years. American Dad!, which was a TBS original series from 2014 to 2025, remained.

On March 4, 2019, AT&T held a reorganization of WarnerMedia (Adult Swim's parent company at the time), dissolving the Turner Broadcasting System. Cartoon Network, Adult Swim, Boomerang, and Turner Classic Movies were transferred to Warner Bros. Entertainment under a new Kids, Young Adults, and Classics division. Although AT&T did not specify any timetable for the changes to take effect, WarnerMedia had begun to remove all Turner references in corporate communications and press releases, referring to Turner's networks as "divisions of WarnerMedia".

=== 2019–present ===
In December 2019, Mike Lazzo retired from the company, which was announced by a bumper that aired on Adult Swim that month. On April 29, 2020, Michael Ouweleen, previously the chief marketing officer of Cartoon Network, Adult Swim and Boomerang, and the co-creator of Harvey Birdman: Attorney at Law, was named the President of Adult Swim, a new position that gives Ouweleen responsibility for all aspects of Adult Swim and its properties. Adult Swim faced layoffs in November 2020, resulting in the closing of Pocket Mortys developer Big Pixel Studios and the cancellation of all of Adult Swim's online live-stream series. Keith Crofford retired from the company in December 2020, which was celebrated with two bumpers featuring Meatwad from Aqua Teen Hunger Force and Seth Green and Matthew Senreich from Robot Chicken. On April 23, 2021, WarnerMedia announced that HBO Max's adult animation development team would merge with Adult Swim, under the leadership of Suzanna Makkos.

Family Guy left Adult Swim on September 18, 2021, after an 18-year-long run. The block noted the occasion with a special bumper featuring various Adult Swim characters waving goodbye to the Griffin family. From October 18, 2021, onward, Adult Swim began airing certain programs in a compressed format, speeding up programs to accommodate additional time slots for advertising sales and airing credits in a split-screen format, similar to TBS; the split-screen credits tactic ceased in 2024. The network reacquired the rights to King of the Hill and Futurama on November 22, 2021, and December 27, 2021, respectively, with both shows continuing to air on FXX and, in Futurama's case, Comedy Central.

In May 2022, following WarnerMedia's divestment by AT&T and merger with Discovery Inc. to form Warner Bros. Discovery, the Warner Bros. Global Kids, Young Adults, and Classics division was dissolved. Several Adult Swim shows, including Tigtone, and Lazor Wulf, were removed from Adult Swim's website and HBO Max that year as a part of massive cost-cutting moves at WBD. Some other series, like Final Space, were written off as a loss for tax purposes and removed from digital stores. On January 24, 2023, Adult Swim announced that it had ended its connection with Rick and Morty co-creator Justin Roiland after he was charged with felony domestic abuse. Show production continued, with Ian Cardoni and Harry Belden cast as Rick and Morty, respectively.

On May 1, 2023, Adult Swim's start time moved up to 7:00 p.m. ET/PT on weekdays and Saturdays, extending the block to eleven hours. Ratings data found that 68% of Cartoon Network's overall viewership between the 6 and 8 p.m. hours had been over the age of 18, thus justifying a further expansion of the block. The first two weeks of the new schedule—which was anchored by the premiere of Unicorn: Warriors Eternal—brought the hour a 24% increase in overall viewership, and a 38% increase among viewers 18–34.

On May 17, 2023, Kathleen Finch, CCO of Warner Bros. Discovery U.S. Networks Group, announced that a further expansion to the 6:00 p.m. ET hour would occur later in the year. The change was officially announced on June 7, 2023, and took effect on August 28, 2023: on weekdays, the hour would feature the new block Checkered Past—which features reruns of classic Cartoon Network original series. It was later announced on August 8, 2023, that Adult Swim would instead begin at 5:00 p.m., expanding the block to 13 hours. ACME Night, a Sunday night movie block, moved from Cartoon Network to Adult Swim following the expansion, starting an hour earlier at 5:00 p.m. Adult Swim's rights to the first eight seasons of Bob's Burgers were set to expire in late 2023, though this did not come to pass. Instead, a deal was made for Adult Swim and FXX to share the show, with later seasons previously exclusive to FXX first appearing on October 2, 2023.

On May 31, 2024, Checkered Past was replaced on Friday evenings by Toonami Rewind, a similar block featuring Sailor Moon, Dragon Ball Z Kai, and Naruto, and similarly using classic Toonami branding from the 2000s. No further series were added, and Toonami Rewind ultimately ended on December 27, 2024, with Checkered Past, shrunken down to an hour, regaining Fridays.

On December 3, 2024, Adult Swim announced that they had reacquired the rights to air Family Guy, which returned to the network on January 1, 2025, with a three-day marathon. The network has non-exclusive rights, sharing the series with FXX and Comedy Central, who itself had acquired the rights in September 2024. Sister station TBS ended its run of American Dad! on March 24, 2025, with the series moving back to Fox for later seasons; Adult Swim, TBS, and TruTV retain syndication rights through 2030. Checkered Past was first discontinued on June 27, 2025, with the 5:00 p.m. hour going to further reruns of 20th Television Animation programming. King of the Hill and Futurama left Adult Swim's lineup for the second time on November 22, 2025 and December 27, 2025, respectively, remaining on FXX. Following the loss of both shows, Checkered Past returned unannounced on December 29, 2025, airing weekdays at 5:00 p.m. for an hour once more.

== Special events ==
=== Death tributes ===
Adult Swim occasionally airs bumpers paying tribute to a recent celebrity death. The bumpers have no music or sound effects, but only a fade-in with the person's name, year of birth, and year of death, followed by a fade-out. That has been done for many people over the years, including celebrities such as Steve Jobs, Kobe Bryant, Chadwick Boseman, MF Doom, and Dolly Parton, and Adult Swim cast and crew such as Harry Goz. Some tribute bumpers have been made jokingly, such as one mocking the declining quality of Game of Thrones in 2017, one marking the lifespan of NFTs as 2021–2021, and one for Sherman Hemsley done in 2014, a full 2 years after his death (adding "Sorry, we just found out. That shit sucks").

After the death of Space Ghost Coast to Coast animator and voice actor C. Martin Croker on September 17, 2016, Adult Swim paid tribute to him the following night, playing the first produced episode of the show ("Elevator") with tribute bumpers bookending the rerun. Toonami also paid tribute to Croker the following Saturday, with T.O.M. and S.A.R.A. saying farewell to former host Moltar (voiced by Croker) in a special intro. Norm Macdonald died on September 14, 2021, and Adult Swim aired an hour of Mike Tyson Mysteries (on which he voiced Pigeon) on the 14th and the 15th. Similar tributes where the network played special reruns have also occurred for celebrities including Gilbert Gottfried, Akira Toriyama, and Paul Reubens.

When Space Ghost voice actor George Lowe died on March 2, 2025, Adult Swim scheduled various reruns of Space Ghost Coast to Coast for the following two weeks, including a marathon on March 6. Adult Swim also aired a tribute bumper and uploaded outtakes with him on YouTube, while Checkered Past aired more Cartoon Planet than previously scheduled.

=== April Fools' Day stunts ===
Since 2004, Adult Swim has had an annual tradition of celebrating April Fools' Day by tricking and fooling their audience by altering programs or airing different and obscure programs. The pranks generally start at 12 a.m. ET on April 1, technically considered part of the March 31 schedule, with an additional prank on the April 1 schedule rarely. Since its launch in 2019, the annual pranks have been simulcast on the Adult Swim network in Canada. Since 2021, the pranks have also been streamed to Adult Swim's YouTube.

- Starting in 2004, all of the regularly scheduled episodes were aired with random mustaches drawn on the characters; however, the next night the episodes were aired again this time without the random mustaches.
- In 2005, Adult Swim aired an early, unfinished version of the Squidbillies pilot, instead of Robot Chicken. Right after the rough cut, it was announced that the animated series would premiere later in October 2005.
- In 2006, Adult Swim aired old re-runs of Mr. T, Karate Kommandos, and Boo Boo Runs Wild in lieu of scheduled anime programming, while also airing episodes of Fullmetal Alchemist and Ghost in the Shell: Stand Alone Complex with fart noises added to the dialog.
- On March 31, 2007, Adult Swim aired all 6 episodes of Perfect Hair Forever that existed at the time, alongside a new episode in reverse order, and edited to look like they were being played from degraded videotapes with poorly-done fansubs (either containing grammatically incorrect English, or dialogue from completely different shows such as Aqua Teen Hunger Force).
- On April 1, 2007, Adult Swim promoted a television premiere of Aqua Teen Hunger Force Colon Movie Film for Theaters ahead of its theatrical release that occurred 9 to 12 days later, but only showed the first two minutes (which had long been available on the film's official website) before minimizing it into a comically small picture-in-picture display over regularly scheduled programming.
- In 2008, instead of airing a scheduled rerun of the ATHF movie, Adult Swim aired a night of unfinished sneak peeks, pilots and stealth premieres of future upcoming shows in place of its regularly scheduled programming, featuring Fat Guy Stuck in Internet, The Venture Bros., Delocated, Superjail!, Young Person's Guide to History, Metalocalypse, Robot Chicken, and Moral Orel. The repeat block aired the scheduled movie, with bumps teasing the viewer about missing the prank.
- In 2009, Adult Swim aired The Room, a critically panned 2003 independent film that was considered a cult classic, with sex scenes obscured with black boxes and with a TV-14 rating. It was followed by the Tim and Eric Awesome Show, Great Job! episode "Tommy", which featured the star and director of the film Tommy Wiseau.
- In 2010, Adult Swim re-aired The Room for a second year in a row, with bumps featuring Tommy Wiseau being interviewed on Space Ghost Coast to Coast. Sex scenes remained censored, but the parental rating was raised to TV-MA.
- In 2011, The Room was aired once again with the TV-MA rating and was followed by a 15-minute special titled Earth Ghost, a CGI version of the Lowe Country pilot shown on Adult Swim's website in 2007.
- In 2012, Adult Swim replaced its lineup with Toonami, a former programming block from Cartoon Network. After first playing the opening sequence of The Room, the scene switched to the Toonami host T.O.M. noting that it was April Fools' Day before introducing that week's scheduled episode of Bleach. The Toonami bumps and programming would continue throughout the night, featuring Dragon Ball Z, Mobile Suit Gundam Wing, Tenchi Muyo!, Outlaw Star, The Big O season 1, Yu Yu Hakusho, Blue Submarine No. 6, Trigun, the original version of Astro Boy, and Gigantor. T.O.M. also presented a review of Mass Effect 3 and promoted the recent DVD releases of the series featured. Subsequently, on May 16, 2012, Adult Swim announced via Twitter and later by a press release that Toonami would return to Adult Swim on May 26, 2012, as a regular weekly Saturday night programming block.
- In 2013, Adult Swim featured images of cats throughout much of its programming. All of the bumps contained videos and images of cats, while the episodes of the live-action shows aired that night had cat faces covering up the faces of the actors. The [adult swim] logo was replaced with "[meow meow]".
- In 2014, Adult Swim premiered an eighth and ninth two-part episode of Perfect Hair Forever, exactly seven years following the second series finale during the 2007 April Fools stunt and about 9 years after the first series finale in 2005. This was followed by an unannounced Space Ghost Coast to Coast marathon featuring creator-chosen episodes (including the full version of "Fire Ant", which has rarely been aired on TV). During the marathon, bumps were included between episodes showing outtakes and commentary from the writers and staff. The prank streamed on a loop on Adult Swim's website the next day.
- In 2015, Adult Swim aired a 6-hour marathon of Aqua Teen Hunger Force, with superimposed coins on the screen, replicating the "Coin Hunt" game from Adult Swim's online live stream show FishCenter. The main characters of the show collected points by hovering over the coins during the episodes, with the points counted and tabulated throughout the night. Master Shake was ultimately declared the winner. FishCenter streamed live during the whole event, featuring special guest Trixie Mattel, Zach White, a guitar music performance from Jared Hill, and several confused call-ins.
- In 2016, advertisements were shown for the April Fools' broadcast, recapping their 12-year history of pranks and hyping up that year's prank. When midnight struck, regular programming played, with the implication being that the prank for 2016 was that there was no prank. The promo kept playing until midnight the next day, repeatedly claiming that the prank was coming up next.
  - The programs on the Adult Swim Streams, however, did participate in a prank by swapping the hosts for every show. As an example, FishCenter was hosted by the Williams Street Swap Shop hosts while Swap Shop was hosted by hosts from FishCenter and Stupid Morning Bullshit.
- On the broadcast night of March 31, 2017, all the regularly scheduled episodes after midnight had a weird audio mix, including added laugh tracks, Seinfeld stings, robotic and pitch-shifted filters added to particular voices, various sound effects and alternate musical pieces.
- On April 1, 2017, the evening portion of Adult Swim was replaced with the unannounced Rick and Morty Season 3 premiere, "The Rickshank Rickdemption". It aired repeatedly from 8:00 p.m. until midnight on TV, shortening Toonami in the process, and streamed on a loop on Adult Swim's website. Newly commissioned Rick and Morty IDs and announcement promos for upcoming shows and seasons aired during the prank. The episode then repeated every night at 10:00 p.m. until April 7.
- On the broadcast night of March 31, 2018, Toonami aired its anime after midnight in Japanese with English subtitles, breaking the block's then policy of only playing dubbed anime. The subbed anime included the stealth premiere of FLCL Alternative, the 2004 film Mind Game, and most of Toonami's scheduled programming for that night. The short Scavengers finished off the block at 5:45 a.m. The block aired special bumpers with T.O.M. and S.A.R.A. and a game review of Nier: Automata, all dubbed to Japanese with English subtitles. The Adult Swim logo was also changed to Japanese (stylized as [アダルトスイム]). The originally scheduled programming affected by the prank aired normally the following week.
- On April 1, 2018, Adult Swim aired an animated parody of Rick and Morty titled "Bushworld Adventures", created by Michael Cusack, at 11:00 p.m., instead of Rick and Morty and Mike Tyson Mysteries. It follows Rick and Morty in Australia going on wild adventures in search to find the green cube that was left at Bendigo. All of Adult Swim's nature-themed bumpers that aired throughout the hour were Australian-themed, and a promo for Ballmastrz: 9009 featured an Australian announcer. The short also streamed on a loop on Adult Swim's website.
- In 2019, Adult Swim aired Gēmusetto Machu Picchu, an anime parody that ran continuously from midnight to 5:45 a.m. It was simulcast both on TV and on Adult Swim's online live stream, with a live Q&A with creator Maxime Simonet airing after the program on the live stream. The special was simulcast on Action in Canada as its second-to-last program ever before its relaunch as a new 24/7 Adult Swim network at 6:00 a.m.
- In 2020, Adult Swim aired "Post's Game", a night of sneak peek programming hosted by Post Malone and friends, playing casual games during the broadcast. The prank started with a tease to a new season of Gēmusetto (which debuted later in the year), only to be interrupted by Malone. New episodes of Primal, Dream Corp LLC, Tigtone, The Shivering Truth, Robot Chicken, Lazor Wulf, 12 oz. Mouse, and Tender Touches aired. The series premieres to YOLO: Crystal Fantasy and JJ Villard's Fairy Tales were also shown, along with the pilot for Smiling Friends, a Rick and Morty short by Studio Deen, and a new trailer for the second half of Rick and Morty season 4. Malone made silent cameos on each show (aside from Primal and Smiling Friends) via green screen. Smiling Friends was quickly uploaded to the website due to popular demand, and got picked up for a full series a year later. FishCenter streamed live during the event on the website, taking calls from viewers.
- In 2021, Adult Swim became "Adult Swim Junior", airing versions of the Rick and Morty episode "Total Rickall" (retitled Rick and Morty Babies) and the Aqua Teen Hunger Force episode "Revenge of the Mooninites" (retitled Aqua Child Hunger Force) that had been overdubbed by children with edited scripts to make them age-appropriate; promos aired during the event featured other Adult Swim programs being made "family-friendly".
- In 2022, Pibby and Bun Bun, the main characters from the Come and Learn with Pibby! proof-of-concept short, appeared in Adult Swim's programming and bumpers from midnight to 2:00 a.m., occasionally having characters and the environment be visually corrupted. The prank repeated from 3:00 a.m. to 5:00 a.m., and Adult Swim later posted a compilation of all the corruptions done in the night's prank. A Pibby-related song played over the network sign-off at 5:59 a.m. HBO Max added the short, and themed the Adult Swim hub around the prank for the following week. Pibby was later not greenlit into a full TV series.
- In 2023, Adult Swim announced that the block would be taken over by AI, followed by a short clip of a Smiling Friends episode reanimated through generative AI. It was quickly cut off due to its uncanniness, only for the channel to lose its "remote" and start "fast forwarding", showing previews of the new series Royal Crackers and the upcoming seasons of The Eric Andre Show and Teenage Euthanasia. The network then "rewound" to an airing of the Space Ghost Coast to Coast episode "Fire Ant". At 1:00 a.m. ET, Adult Swim then aired the Infomercials shorts Unedited Footage of a Bear and Broomshakalaka! as "[as-]" ("Adult Swim Minus"; "all the commercials you love minus all the annoying shows"). Afterward, to provide "something meditative" as an apology for the previous 90 minutes, a half hour of footage of a train traveling through Norway was aired under the title Ambient Swim.
- For 2024, after promoting that season 2 of Smiling Friends would premiere at midnight on March 31, Adult Swim instead aired a series of three season 1 episodes that had been reshot in live-action with puppets ("Mr. Frog" with Muppet-style puppets, "Shrimp's Odyssey" with sock puppets and live-action humans, and "Charlie Dies and Doesn't Come Back" was redone with papier-mâché puppets). This was then followed by the season 2 premiere as originally promised, along with an announcement that the remainder of season 2 would begin airing on May 12.
- For 2025, Adult Swim aired Portal People, a half-hour special featuring notable Rick and Morty scenes reinterpreted as live-action stage plays. The special concluded with a trailer for Rick and Morty season 8, with the announcement that it would premiere on May 25.
- For 2026, Adult Swim aired an extended cut of the Smiling Friends episode "Curse of the Green Halloween Witch" with an extended version of Ghosts & Chainsaws, a Lee Hardcastle-animated claymation show-within-a-show that was briefly seen at the start of the episode. This was followed by a trailer for the final two episodes of season 3, which would premiere on April 12.

=== Alternate reality games ===
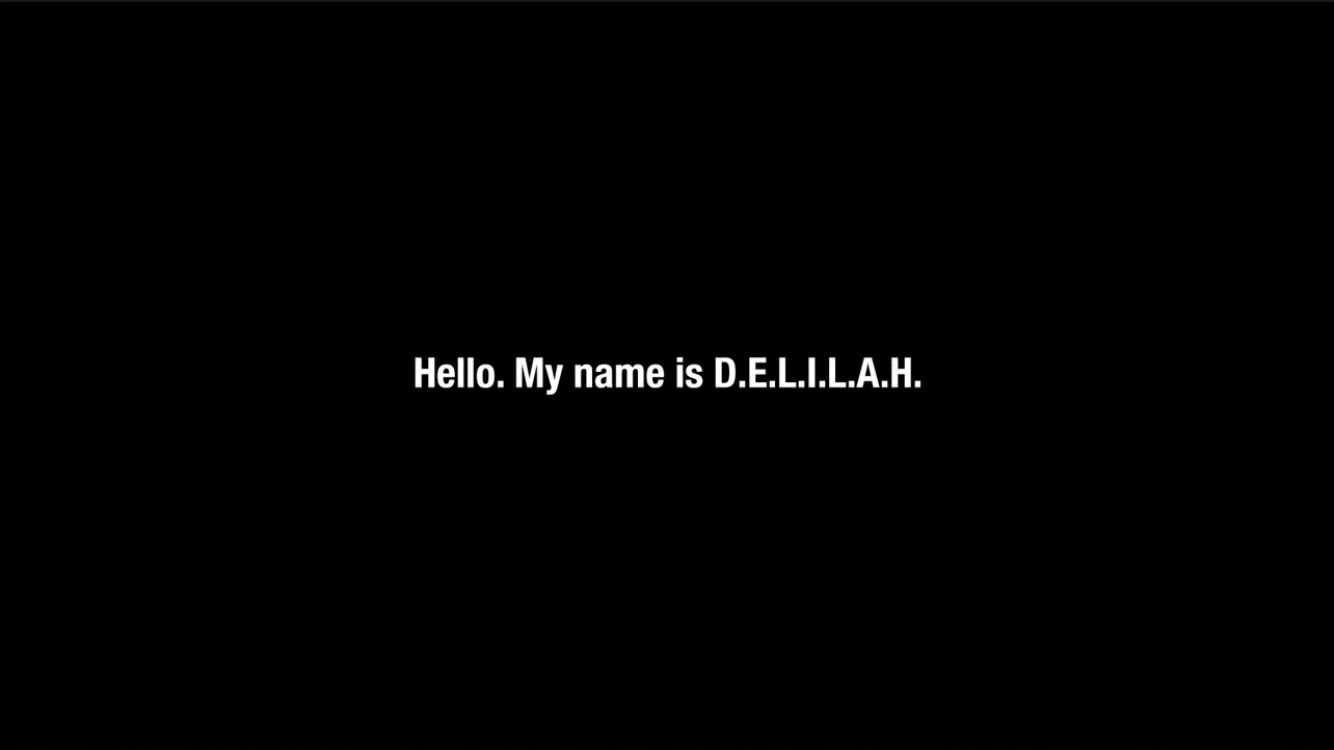
Image from part of the ARG transmission that aired on August 27, 2017. All subsequent transmissions have followed the same basic format.

Adult Swim began an ARG campaign on August 27, 2017, by airing a cryptic bump "transmission" during a new episode of Rick and Morty. The bump referred viewers to a Twitter account. Players were told that they were trying to rescue a stolen AI named Delilah. Weekly bumps provided puzzles to be solved by viewers with solutions submitted via Twitter. The solutions were then confirmed by both the Twitter account and subsequent bumps. Later in the game, Delilah was forced to self-destruct to prevent a security breach. The Twitter account then rebranded itself as a marketing company and claimed that the entire game was an experiment. Soon after this, a new Twitter account followed all the previous account's existing followers. This new account informed everyone that they were searching for their missing sister named Amelia. The bump transmissions then started referring viewers to this new Twitter account as well as several new Instagram accounts, continuing to provide puzzles that required solving. The ARG has been consistently broadcasting new messages and puzzles every Sunday since the initial August 2017 broadcast, with only a short hiatus during the 2017 holiday break. On March 25, 2018, it was revealed that Amelia was safe and had been for quite some time. Players learned that Amelia's messages asking for help were actually sent 3 years prior and that their delay in being received was caused by time dilation. This revelation effectively completed the second chapter of the ARG, and alluded to the next phase, which started in June 2018. The following narratives explored the intricate connections between Delilah, Amelia, and the newly introduced character, Tristan, revealing layers of corporate and personal intrigue involving Proto-X and the shadowy organization known as Sinistra MGMT.

== Programming ==
Original shows currently in-production and seen on Adult Swim include Off the Air, Rick and Morty, Smiling Friends, Primal, Robot Chicken, Common Side Effects, and My Adventures with Superman. Adult Swim is well known for its inaugural slate of programming, which were mainly parodies and remakes based on Hanna-Barbera properties (including Space Ghost Coast to Coast, Harvey Birdman, Attorney at Law, Aqua Teen Hunger Force, The Brak Show, and Sealab 2021), as well as for later hits including Rick and Morty, Robot Chicken, and The Boondocks.

Adult Swim also airs syndicated programs from 20th Television Animation (American Dad!, Bob's Burgers, Family Guy) and have acquired and co-produced various anime series. Via Adult Swim, Cartoon Network is one of the few U.S. networks to carry anime, with Disney XD.

=== Toonami ===
Logo for Toonami since July 2025

Most anime and action-genre programming airs on Saturday nights as part of Toonami, Cartoon Network's former anime programming block that was relaunched by Adult Swim on May 26, 2012, as a "block-within-a-block". Like in the Cartoon Network incarnation, the block is hosted by robot TOM (voiced by Steve Blum) and AI matrix SARA (voiced by Dana Swanson), with several "Total Immersion Events" having featured changes to the setting of the block and appearances of the hosts. Cartoon Network shows that have gained a following among older viewers have also aired on Toonami; in particular, Samurai Jack proved popular enough in reruns to warrant a revival in 2017.

Prior to Toonami's revival, Adult Swim carried anime programming under the name Adult Swim Action (also known as AcTN), and aired anime on weekdays and Saturdays before relegating anime programming exclusively to Saturdays by 2009. Older anime programming briefly aired as a part of Toonami Rewind, a Friday afternoon block that launched on May 31, 2024, and ended later in the year on December 27. The block's only three featured programs were reabsorbed into the regular Toonami block in January 2025.

=== ACME Night ===
ACME Night, themed after the Wile E. Coyote and the Road Runner Looney Tunes cartoons, was a Sunday afternoon movie block that originally debuted as a Cartoon Network block on September 19, 2021, before moving to Adult Swim on September 3, 2023, and ending on December 29, 2024. While a Cartoon Network block, ACME Night was intended to produce original programming and films for a family audience. Ultimately, only the game show Harry Potter: Hogwarts Tournament of Houses premiered on the block (while simulcast on TBS).

After the Warner Bros. Discovery merger, several planned programs and films were either scrapped or moved to other networks and services, including Unicorn: Warriors Eternal, which moved to Adult Swim, Batman: Caped Crusader and Merry Little Batman, which moved to Prime Video, and The Day the Earth Blew Up: A Looney Tunes Movie, which was released theatrically by Ketchup Entertainment. The Sunday evening block mostly aired acquired films, including films rated PG-13, which was unusual for Cartoon Network. Programming from TBS, TruTV, and Adult Swim was often used as time-filler following the movie. While on Cartoon Network, the block ran from 6:00 p.m. to 9:00 p.m. ET; following the move to Adult Swim, it ran from 5:00 p.m. until the film's conclusion.

=== Checkered Past ===
Checkered Past
- Logo used since August 28, 2023
- Launched: August 28, 2023; 3 years ago
- Country of origin: United States
- Format: Throwback animation
- Running time: 2 hours (2023–24); 1 hour (2024–present)

A nostalgia-focused block, Checkered Past, launched on August 28, 2023. It currently airs older Cartoon Network original series from the 1990s and 2000s, including those belonging to the Cartoon Cartoons brand. The block's name is a reference to Cartoon Network's iconic checkerboard motif used since its 1992 launch. The two-hour block marks Adult Swim's expansion into evening hours, and originally ran Monday through Friday from 5 p.m. to 7 p.m. ET/PT. The block was shortened to 5 p.m. to 6 p.m. on December 30, 2024, before being initially discontinued on June 27, 2025. The block returned unannounced on December 29, 2025, remaining an hour. The block also runs on the Latin American feed of Adult Swim.

In July 2024, Andy Merrill returned to Adult Swim to portray a puppet version of Space Ghost character Brak, which appeared during Checkered Past in late 2024 during reruns of Cartoon Planet.

==== Current programming ====
Title	Premiere date
Samurai Jack	May 10, 2024

==== Former programming ====
Title	Premiere date	End date
Courage the Cowardly Dog (Note: Also part of What a Cartoon!)	August 28, 2023	April 3, 2026
Dexter's Laboratory	August 28, 2023	October 2, 2026
Ed, Edd n Eddy	August 28, 2023	May 22, 2026
The Grim Adventures of Billy & Mandy (Note: Part of Grim & Evil)	August 28, 2023	July 17, 2026
Grim & Evil	October 2, 2023	
Cow and Chicken	December 1, 2023	August 28, 2026
I Am Weasel (Note: Part of Cow and Chicken)	December 1, 2023	February 9, 2024
Evil Con Carne	December 1, 2023	February 12, 2026
What a Cartoon!	July 29, 2024	February 21, 2025
Johnny Bravo	July 29, 2024	February 20, 2025
Cartoon Planet	September 16, 2024	May 9, 2025
The Cartoon Cartoon Show	February 17, 2025	February 21, 2025

== Merchandise and media offerings ==
=== Official website ===
Adult Swim's official website features full episodes of shows, online streams and podcasts, music streaming, comics, a programming schedule, and a section dedicated to its Toonami programming block. User accounts could once be made on the site, initially for the site's messaging boards, which launched in May 2003 and shut down in October 2016. By 2018, the only main functionality for user accounts left was for creating profiles and participating in the live stream chatrooms. User accounts were permanently disabled in January 2021, following the removal of the chat function.

A store was available on the site, although initially only through the main Cartoon Network store from 2001 to 2004. The store later spun-off into its own website, the Adult Swim Shop, in 2004, and ran until 2012. Another store, As Seen on Adult Swim, launched in 2013 and only sold a single item at a time until 2017, when a QVC-like show was launched with the same name on the Adult Swim streams. The site later shut down in January 2021, following the end of the series in November.

=== Video on demand and online streaming ===
In mid-2004, Adult Swim launched a video on demand service on subscription television providers. The service includes several episodes from various Adult Swim original series, syndicated series, and anime licensed for Toonami. The anime series s-CRY-ed initially premiered on demand before debuting on the regular block in May 2005. The video on demand service was added to DirecTV in October 2007, on channel 1886. Adult Swim introduced online video streaming in 2006, providing a free online video on demand service for recent and older episodes of select programming. Initially, some episodes premiered on the website early, although eventually episodes began appearing 1–3 days after broadcast. This became a week after broadcast in June 2010.

In August 2011, Adult Swim began requiring TV Everywhere authentication for most episodes on the site, greatly reducing the amount of free content. This service was combined with the Adult Swim mobile app in 2014. Around this time, Adult Swim began posting every episode of select series online for free viewing, although some of these were removed in 2015 when Hulu acquired the rights to multiple shows, and once again in 2020 when sibling service HBO Max, known as Max from May 2023 to July 2025, launched.

As of 2025, many Adult Swim shows are available on HBO Max, though several series have expired since initially being added, with most of them returning to the Adult Swim website. Hulu, which previously had several series, now only has Rick and Morty and The Eric Andre Show, the latter being exclusive to the service. Adult Swim's current programming, excluding Rick and Morty (which is released on HBO Max and Hulu a month after each season ends), The Eric Andre Show, and Off the Air (which is available on YouTube), is put on HBO Max the day after new episodes air. Several Adult Swim shows are available for purchase on iTunes, Google TV, Amazon, Microsoft Movies & TV, and Vudu.

=== Video games ===
Adult Swim once had many Flash-based online games available on their website, including Robot Unicorn Attack and Five Minutes to Kill (Yourself), but all of the games were removed in 2020 following the discontinuation of Adobe Flash Player. Starting in 2005, Adult Swim began publishing mobile games, including those based on Adult Swim franchises and original content. In 2011, the division Adult Swim Games was created to publish original indie game content, largely focusing on the hardcore gamer market. The publisher has not released a game since Samurai Jack: Battle Through Time in 2020, and, in 2024, relinquished the rights to most of their games back to the original developers, save for games they were unable to contact the developer for (which were delisted) or games based on the network's IPs (Samurai Jack, Rick and Morty: Virtual Rick-ality, and the still-updated Pocket Mortys). Samurai Jack and Rick and Morty: Virtual Rick-ality were later delisted from most stores, while Pocket Mortys is slated to shut down on April 13, 2026. The Adult Swim Games website shut down in February 2026.

=== Music ===
Adult Swim has partnerships with several independent music labels, and has co-produced and released compilation albums with Stones Throw Records, Ghostly International, Definitive Jux, and Chocolate Industries through their own label, Williams Street Records. Many of Adult Swim's bumps and packaging make use of instrumental and electronic music. Various music is also often borrowed from artists signed onto a wide array of different labels, including Warp Records and Ninja Tune Records.

=== Live events ===
Adult Swim has held various live events throughout the years through its Adult Swim Presents division. Adult Swim frequently appears at San Diego Comic-Con, often holding sneak previews, games, musical performances, among other things. Since 2018, it has held an annual Adult Swim Festival, with a mix of music, comedy, panels, and other festivities. 2018 and 2019's festivals took place in Los Angeles, and had select performances streamed live on the Adult Swim Streams. Due to the COVID-19 pandemic, 2020 and 2021's festivals were held online, through prerecorded videos and live streams on YouTube. The 2022 festival, known as the Adult Swim Festival Block Party was held in Philadelphia, with highlight reels and select full performances being streamed to YouTube. The 2023 festival, known as the Adult Swim Festival On the Green, occurred at San Diego Comic-Con and had no online live stream.

=== Podcast ===
Adult Swim offered a video podcast on iTunes from March 21 to September 19, 2006. The podcasts featured behind-the-scenes segments of shows and exclusive content; such as an interview with Saved by the Bell's Dennis Haskins and a look at Brendon Small and Tommy Blacha's Metalocalypse. The podcast reached number two in iTunes' ranking of most downloaded podcasts.

A new audio-only podcast, called the Adult Swim Podcast, was launched on July 11, 2019, hosted by Matt Harrigan. In regular episodes, Harrigan interviews different Adult Swim contributors, show creators, and actors. Max Simonet was later added as a co-host, with interviews still done solo by Harrigan. No new episodes of the Adult Swim Podcast have released since November 2020, and links to the podcast on the website were eventually removed. Adult Swim also teamed up with Abso Lutely Productions to produce season 2 of the This is Branchburg comedy podcast.

=== Live streams and web series ===
On September 25, 2013, Adult Swim began simulcasting their channel through the Adult Swim mobile app and website, although TV Everywhere authentication is required. Both the East and West Coast feeds are available. In late 2014, Adult Swim added several free 24/7 live streams to their website, most of them airing marathons of different shows on a loop. One of the live streams, a feed of the Williams Street office's fish tank, became its own series: FishCenter Live, and led to the creation of the Adult Swim Streams.

The Adult Swim Streams consisted of several online-exclusive originals, usually broadcast live, and featured a chatroom, similar to that of Twitch. Many of the shows also accepted calls from viewers to interact with the hosts or change the course of a program.

Select shows aired daily on the service, these included:

- FishCenter Live: A parody of SportsCenter and the flagship series, consisting of Matt Harrigan, Max Simonet, Dave Bonawits, Andrew Choe, and Christina Loranger narrating over footage of the Williams Street fish tank. Fish scored points through games started by the hosts and games played by callers. Special guests, like musicians and comedians, often performed.
- Stupid Morning Bullshit: A morning (later, evenings) talk show hosted by Sally Skinner, discussing strange news stories and current events.
- Williams Street Swap Shop: A phone-in trading show in the vein of tradio programs hosted by Zachary White and Matt Hutchinson. A spin-off, Traveling Tuesdays, had Zach visit places around Atlanta.
- Bloodfeast: A crossword puzzle solving show hosted by Max Simonet and Dave Bonawits that frequently used surreal content intended to disturb viewers, including animations, poetry, and short films. The show received two animated TV spinoffs, Tender Touches in 2017, followed by Gēmusetto in 2019. A stream spin-off known as Bloodfeast Presents featured musical performances using the same special effects to create unique visuals.
- Desperate Losers: A show hosted by various Adult Swim employees that had them play with scratch-off tickets in an attempt to supplement their incomes. The show alternated recording between Atlanta, New York City, and Connecticut.

Some shows aired weekly or on special occasions, these included:

- Assembly Line Yeah!: An arts-and-crafts show hosted by Jiyoung Lee and Anca Vlasan.
- Last Stream on the Left: A podcast-style show hosted by Ben Kissel, Henry Zebrowski, and Marcus Parks. The hosts discuss dark or disturbing stories, conspiracy theories, and paranormal happenings.
- Digikiss: A live one-on-one video dating show where viewers could ask questions and watch the date unfold.
- Truthpoint: Darkweb Rising: A show hosted by dril and Derek Estevez-Olsen, a parody of InfoWars.
- As Seen on Adult Swim: A show hosted by Nick Gibbons, in the style of a home shopping program, selling Adult Swim merchandise and giving away a rare item as the last item every night to a winner of a contest.
- Development Meeting: A show hosted by development coordinators Walter Newman and Cameron Tang where viewers could pitch programs to Adult Swim. Unfinished sneak peeks to upcoming productions were also shown until 2019. One pitch, Skeleton Landlord, eventually made it on air as a part of Infomercials.
- Toonami Pre-Flight: A show hosted by Jason DeMarco and Gill Austin, where they discussed programming, took fan questions, and showed sneak peeks to upcoming promos and game reviews.
- Block or Charge: A comedy clip show hosted by Rex Chapman and David Helmers, based on Chapman's tweets.
- The Cry of Mann, The Call of Warr, and The Weather: Three series from Wham City, where viewers could call in and either play characters or change the story.

Some of the live stream shows aired edited down versions of their shows on Fridays at 4:00 am, under the collective name Williams Stream. Several previously recorded web series are available on demand on the website, including On Cinema at the Cinema and its spin-off Decker, which later became a TV series for Adult Swim. Almost all of Adult Swim's then ongoing web series, including the Adult Swim Streams as a whole, were canceled by November 2020. Adult Swim Smalls, a shorts program produced by Off the Air's Dave Hughes, was the only web series to remain. Some series, like On Cinema, have continued on independently. New web series, including spin-offs of Aqua Teen Hunger Force and Rick and Morty, started releasing in 2022.

The website features several free live streams consisting of marathons of specific Adult Swim programming. Additionally, there is Channel 5, a live stream consisting of various Tim & Eric productions made for the network, along with original series made for the stream, TimAndEric.com sketches, content made for Jash, and the Super Deluxe series Tim and Eric Nite Live!. Some of the marathon streams had chatrooms similar to the live stream, though these were removed along with the live stream chatroom in January 2021.

=== Mobile and OTT applications ===
Since its premiere in 2001, Adult Swim executives have worked extensively to extend the brand's reach to viewers in venues outside of the normal pay-television services. This includes the launch of the adultswim.com website and the release of apps for various mobile and over-the-top platforms providing access to current and past Adult Swim programming, live marathons, live and pre-recorded original programs and the nightly online simulcast of the Adult Swim broadcast. Currently apps are available in the U.S. only for Amazon Fire TV, Android (including Google Cast on Android TV), Apple TV, iOS, Chromecast, Roku, and Xbox One. Due to licensing agreements certain parts of the apps including access to its live simulcast and most episodes of their shows require the viewer to use their subscription-television provider or OTT-platform username and password to authenticate their right to access such content.

== International ==
Adult Swim has been actively expanding its reach across the world since 2005. Localized versions have aired in Australia, Russia, Brazil and the rest of Latin America. Adult Swim is usually not paired with Cartoon Network due to local market conditions or government content restrictions and regulations – such as Ofcom in the United Kingdom. In such markets, Adult Swim programming is licensed to other broadcasters instead. As of 2026, Adult Swim shows are available to stream on HBO Max worldwide.

=== Africa ===
In November 2018, Adult Swim made its African debut in South Africa's MultiChoice's streaming service Showmax featuring shows such as Rick and Morty, Samurai Jack, Robot Chicken, and Eagleheart at launch. In June 2019, the brand was temporarily made available on TNT as a programming block.

=== Australia and New Zealand ===
The Australian and New Zealand version of Adult Swim was broadcast on Cartoon Network until December 31, 2007. Shows aired at that time were Aqua Teen Hunger Force, Sealab 2021, Space Ghost Coast to Coast, Harvey Birdman: Attorney at Law (which also aired on SBS), Tom Goes to the Mayor, Home Movies, The Venture Bros., and before its closure, Squidbillies. The comedy block aired every Friday and Saturday and an action block aired during the week, including mature anime like Cowboy Bebop, Inuyasha, Bleach, Air Gear, Black Cat, and Ghost in the Shell: Stand Alone Complex.

Presently, original comedies have premiered on The Comedy Channel in Australia. The block would return on The Comedy Channel in March 2008, with Aqua Teen Hunger Force joining the lineup on July 1. The channel has aired The Boondocks, but not under the Adult Swim banner. To date, Adult Swim has grown considerably with the block now airing every Saturday from 12 to 2 am AEST and 6:30 to 7:30 pm AEST to keep with the late night tradition of the former block.

Adult Swim's programming has been released to Region 4 DVD by Madman Entertainment, including shows that have never been shown in Australia. Madman Entertainment has also released R4 exclusive DVDs not available in the United States, including Volume 2 and 3 of Moral Orel and complete collections of Minoriteam and Assy McGee. The Aqua Teen Hunger Force Colon Movie Film for Theaters has also been quietly released to DVD. After moving to The Comedy Channel in January 2008, Adult Swim stopped airing in New Zealand until 2021. In October 2013, Turner Broadcasting in partnership with MCM Media and Movideo launched an Adult Swim video on demand service.

In June 2016, Channel 9 signed a two-year deal with Turner Broadcasting to air a block of Adult Swim shows on 9Go!. After the deal expired, 9Go! did not renew with Turner Broadcasting, and thus the block was shut down. In February 2021, TVNZ began airing Adult Swim programming on TVNZ Duke in New Zealand. Shows that are currently airing on the channel, such as Aqua Teen Hunger Force, Birdgirl, Eagleheart, Mr. Pickles, Primal, Robot Chicken, The Eric Andre Show, The Shivering Truth, The Venture Bros., and YOLO: Crystal Fantasy, are available to stream for free on TVNZ+.

As of December 2022, the streaming service Stan has Adult Swim shows such as Aqua Teen Hunger Force, Robot Chicken and Ballmastrz 9009 available for streaming in Australia. In March 2025, the streaming service HBO Max launched in Australia and as of September 2025 has the Adult Swim shows: Rick and Morty, Rick and Morty: The Anime, and Samurai Jack in its catalog.

=== Canada ===
The version of Corus Entertainment's Teletoon (now Cartoon Network) in English and French previously offered adult-oriented blocks that carried Adult Swim programming and aired similar shows: Teletoon at Night and Télétoon la nuit. On February 2, 2012, then-parent company TELETOON Canada Inc. announced that it would be launching a Canadian version of Adult Swim, sharing channel space with the Canadian version of Cartoon Network as a specialty channel just as its American counterpart does. The block launched on July 4, 2012. From September 2015 – September 2017, all of Adult Swim's original series was aired exclusively on the block.

Meanwhile, YTV has aired anime series that premiered on Adult Swim in its Bionix block. G4's Anime Current block, Razer's (now MTV2) Kamikaze block, the defunct Scream (later Dusk), and Super Channel have also aired various anime titles that were broadcast on Adult Swim. In June 2009, G4 Canada launched Adult Digital Distraction, programming that featured many Adult Swim shows. In late 2011, the block was discontinued due to pressure from the CRTC on account of the channel deviating from its original format (which was to air technology-related programming). The block would be briefly relaunched before being dropped again in 2012.

Tim and Eric Awesome Show, Great Job! aired on Bell Media's CTV Comedy Channel (formerly The Comedy Network). In December 2013, sibling network Much began airing Childrens Hospital and, later, its spinoff, Newsreaders. They also aired the short-lived series The Jack and Triumph Show. In October 2014, Netflix began streaming Mike Tyson Mysteries the day after its television premiere in the United States.

On February 25, 2016, Williams Street launched a Canada-specific subscription video-on-demand service for iOS and Android devices. The app contains the majority of Adult Swim produced content, including programming not seen on Canadian television. New premieres are added soon after their U.S. broadcast, with the exception of new episodes of Robot Chicken and, initially, Rick and Morty, which are added the day after its premiere on the Canadian block. The app was discontinued in November 2018.

On March 4, 2019, Teletoon and YTV's current parent company, Corus Entertainment, announced the launch of a full-time 24/7 Adult Swim network on April 1, 2019, as a rebrand of Action, which was formerly under the Showcase brand. This marks the first time an international version of Adult Swim was launched as its own television channel. With the channel's launch, the Canadian block, as well as Teletoon at Night, were both discontinued as both channels would now focus exclusively on age-appropriate programming. The Canadian Adult Swim block was dropped on March 3, 2019, and Teletoon at Night closed on March 31, 2019.

As very few Adult Swim programs are dubbed in French, Télétoon la nuit's acquisitions from the block were very limited. Among some of the shows, the earlier seasons of The Boondocks and Rick and Morty manage to be dubbed locally in Canadian French with Quebec accents. The latter would be brought back on Télétoon la nuit on September 29, 2025, using the European French dub. My Adventures with Superman and Invincible Fight Girl, two shows intended to be shown on Cartoon Network in the United States but moved to Adult Swim, were shown in French Canada on Télétoon's daytime schedule, which is usually aimed at children and families.

=== France ===
The block was launched on March 4, 2011, and airs nightly from 11 p.m. to 6 a.m. on Cartoon Network France. It has aired Aqua Teen Hunger Force, Harvey Birdman: Attorney at Law, Metalocalypse, Moral Orel, Robot Chicken, and Squidbillies. Like most international Adult Swim blocks, it does not air Fox and action shows. Most of the block's programming is not dubbed and airs with English audio and French subtitles.

In the early 2000s, there was a late-night block called "DZAQC" (pronounced "Désaxé"), which carried the 2001 Adult Swim look but did not have any adult shows, except for Home Movies and Captain Linger. Case Closed was aired on Cartoon Network and Toonami. DZAQC aired random Cartoon Network shows and old promos in English with French subtitles. A new Adult Swim block launched in March 2015 on L'Enôrme TV. The block stopped broadcasting in June 2016.

On May 15, 2019, WarnerMedia France announced that an Adult Swim block would launch in July that year, with season 4 of Rick and Morty exclusively airing on it in November. The block launched on July 24, 2019, airing on Warner TV Next (formerly Toonami) between 11 p.m. and 2 a.m. CET. On-demand services are available on French online TV and on-demand provider Molotov TV.

=== Germany ===
The Adult Swim block was launched on January 28, 2009, on TNT Serie (now known as WarnerTV Serie). In 2016, TNT Glitz became TNT Comedy (now known as WarnerTV Comedy) and took over Adult Swim. Programs on the block include American Dad!, Assy McGee, Lucy, The Daughter of the Devil, Metalocalypse, Moral Orel, Robot Chicken, Rick and Morty, Stroker & Hoop, The Brak Show, The Venture Bros., Aqua Teen Hunger Force, and The Eric Andre Show.

=== Italy ===
In Italy, several Adult Swim series such as Aqua Teen Hunger Force, The Venture Bros., Robot Chicken, China, IL, NTSF:SD:SUV:: and Mr. Pickles are available on-demand via TIMvision. Rick and Morty was also dubbed in Italian for release on Netflix, The Boondocks aired on Comedy Central and MTV, while The Oblongs aired on Italia Teen Television and All Music. On Facebook, Adult Swim Italy confirmed the possibility of airing on Cartoon Network and Boing. In 2018, Robot Chicken and Rick and Morty were released on DVD and Blu-ray from Eagle Pictures in Italy.

=== Latin America ===
In Latin America, an Adult Swim block aired during the overnight hours on Cartoon Network beginning on October 7, 2005. The premiere of Adult Swim was received by a major backlash from at least one pay TV operator in Latin America. VTR, a cable TV company, unilaterally censored the block from its premiere until early 2007, due to editorial policies inherited from Ricardo Claro Valdés, one of the company's shareholders, infamously known for censoring programming on cable channels while he owned Metropolis Intercom, a company that was absorbed by VTR in 2005.

VTR's position was that Cartoon Network should be a children's channel and should not carry adult content whatsoever. According to a company study, the audience during Adult Swim's time slot was mostly children, which went against the company's policies. VTR and Turner Broadcasting System agreed to broadcast Adult Swim on VTR's PPV movie service, available only in digital and in some parts of Chile, due to the fact that VTR had not updated its cable TV networks at the time. In early 2007, Adult Swim returned to the Cartoon Network grid until its first shutdown. It was originally carried on the regional version of the channel, when it was pulled off and picked up by I.Sat on November 19, 2007, another Turner Broadcasting System Latin America-owned-and-operated network. On December 1, 2010, I.Sat revealed that it was cutting Adult Swim programming due to low ratings, adding: "No matter if we add new shows, it would not work".

In 2014, it was announced that Adult Swim would return to Latin America later in the year. It premiered on the Brazilian feed of TBS on November 3, 2014. Adult Swim relaunched in Latin America on April 3, 2015, on I.Sat, in English with Spanish subtitles, premiering Rick and Morty and many other shows for the first time on the region. On January 6, 2018, the block began broadcasting throughout Latin America on TBS. Unlike I.Sat, this block was being broadcast in Spanish.

After ceasing broadcasts on I.Sat and TBS, Warner Channel began airing the block on May 2, 2020, for Latin America and Brazil, with new content like Final Space and the rest of Aqua Teen Hunger Force and Robot Chicken series. The block lost the schedule from Monday to Thursday and Saturdays on September 14, airing only on Mondays at midnight, and the following month, it stopped releasing new bumpers. On November 15, Adult Swim dropped out of Warner Channel's programming, being its last broadcast on November 8, 2021.

On June 24, 2021, HBO Max announced a list of some original Adult Swim content that became available since the platform's launch, including: Rick and Morty, Aqua Teen Hunger Force, Robot Chicken, Primal, Squidbillies, The Shivering Truth, and Your Pretty Face is Going to Hell. Its launch took place on June 29, 2021. On August 22, 2023, it was announced that a 24-hour Adult Swim channel would launch in Latin America in October 2023. On September 3, it was announced that Adult Swim would replace TruTV on October 31.

=== Russia ===
From its relaunch in March 2007 to April 2023, 2x2, a Russian channel specializing in animation, aired Adult Swim's original series. There was a separate Adult Swim block and an English-language block, where shows were broadcast in English without dubbing, both are now defunct. Adult Swim–produced shows that have aired include Aqua Teen Hunger Force, Robot Chicken, Moral Orel, Sealab 2021, 12 oz. Mouse, The Venture Bros., The Brak Show, Stroker & Hoop, Tom Goes to the Mayor, Squidbillies, Harvey Birdman, Attorney at Law, Space Ghost Coast to Coast, Frisky Dingo, Perfect Hair Forever, Metalocalypse, Lucy, the Daughter of the Devil, and others. 2x2 also broadcast many of the anime that premiered in the U.S. on Adult Swim, although not on 2x2's Adult Swim's schedule. Some shows including The Boondocks and Rick and Morty also premiered outside Adult Swim's block.

On November 1, 2019, 2x2 announced an addition of the Adult Swim section on its site with a library containing selected Adult Swim series broadcast earlier on the channel and new series including The Heart, She Holler, Off the Air, The Eric Andre Show, Dream Corp LLC, and Neon Joe, Werewolf Hunter, premiering on the site uncut. In March 2021, the shows were removed from the site. As of 2024, the broadcast rights to all Adult Swim shows expired and according to 2x2, could no longer be extended.

=== Spain ===
In Spain, Adult Swim was a programming block which aired on Fridays from midnight on TNT, between 2007 and 2012. Despite the fact that the block no longer exists in Spain, several of its original series have their own section on HBO. In December 2020, Adult Swim returned alongside Toonami as a premium pack of the Orange TV service. In it, there are more than 600 episodes of 19 different series like Rick and Morty, Metalocalypse, and Robot Chicken, among others.

=== United Kingdom and Ireland ===
In 2002, CNX was launched in the United Kingdom as a spin-off of Cartoon Network featuring much of the content found on Adult Swim and Toonami, anime shows and adult action films, but closed operations after a year in 2003. A nightly Adult Swim channel was launched on July 8, 2006, on the now defunct Bravo owned by Virgin Media Television, generally beginning at midnight. Shows such as Robot Chicken, Aqua Teen Hunger Force, Sealab 2021, The Brak Show, Tom Goes to the Mayor, Squidbillies, Space Ghost Coast to Coast, 12 oz. Mouse, The Venture Bros., Moral Orel, and Metalocalypse, were part of the UK's Adult Swim block. The first "action" series was Afro Samurai, an anime show which aired on May 4, 2007, alongside a new UK animated show Modern Toss. On July 7, 2008, Adult Swim ceased to broadcast on Bravo.

Former Sony Pictures Television channel TruTV started airing Adult Swim shows every night from 11 pm to around 3 am in November and December 2016. It broadcast episodes of Rick and Morty, Robot Chicken, Mr. Pickles, and Squidbillies. The UK Adult Swim website offers free access to full episodes of shows including Squidbillies, Harvey Birdman, Attorney at Law, Tom Goes to the Mayor, Minoriteam, Stroker & Hoop, Moral Orel, 12 oz. Mouse, Perfect Hair Forever, Metalocalypse, and Frisky Dingo. Revolver Entertainment began distributing original Adult Swim series on DVD in the UK and Ireland.

FX aired Robot Chicken, Titan Maximum, Venture Brothers, and Metalocalypse. The shows were advertised with [adult swim] branding. They started to air on June 5, 2010, in conjunction with the channel's regular schedule and ended on November 27, 2010. On December 14, 2011, the Robot Chicken: Star Wars trilogy appeared on Syfy at 10 pm. The block began airing on TCM 2 starting on January 4, 2012. Adult Swim returned to UK and Irish television beginning with a new block of programming on FOX channel on September 4, 2015. It was discontinued in September 2017, and Adult Swim was then not broadcast on television, although Rick and Morty since moved to Comedy Central and is available to stream on Netflix in the UK and Ireland.

Adult Swim again returned to the UK with a new block on E4 in February 2019. The block shows Adult Swim shows as well as other programs able to stream on Channel 4 including Tim and Eric Awesome Show, Great Job!, Rick and Morty, and other shows. Rick and Morty reruns air on E4 Extra with additional broadcasts of Adult Swim which are not always shown on Fridays.

=== Scandinavia ===
Adult Swim's debut to Scandinavia began in 2011 through Showtime Scandinavia. On June 21, 2018, Nordic Entertainment Group (now known as Viaplay Group) and Turner International announced the launch of Adult Swim on a free and ad-supported streaming service, Viafree in Norway, Sweden, Denmark, and Finland.

The Adult Swim section was launched on August 1, 2018, offering a robust catalog of Adult Swim’s animated and live-action series tailored for young adult audiences. That expanded accessibility, allowing viewers to stream content on-demand without the constraints of cable television schedules. The Viafree launch included hundreds of episodes at launch, with new content added monthly to keep the platform dynamic. All programming was subtitled in local languages to cater to the local audiences.

== High definition channels and service ==
A high-definition feed of Adult Swim is available on many subscription-television providers, and is shared with its daytime counterpart Cartoon Network. The high-definition feed broadcasts in 1080i high-definition on nearly all providers. It was launched on October 15, 2007, along with Cartoon Network HD. Until 2023, standard-definition 4:3 content was stretched to 16:9 on the high definition feed to fill the 16:9 aspect ratio, although certain 4:3 content, usually high-definition restorations, were aired in their original aspect ratio with pillarboxing. Starting September 25, 2023, that changed to airing 4:3 content zoomed and cropped to 14:9, before settling on airing all 4:3 content in its original aspect ratio as of October 18, 2023. Network bumpers and promos were still made in the 4:3 aspect ratio until 2010 in addition to appearing stretched on the high-definition feed. Since May 2013, the high-definition feed is the primary feed, with the standard-definition feed only airing a letterboxed version of the high-definition feed.
