= Max Simonet =

American television host

Maxime Simonet
- Occupation: Former producer at Adult Swim
- Notable work: FishCenter Live; Bloodfeast; Tender Touches; Gēmusetto

Maxime Simonet is a Franco-American writer, producer, editor, and voice actor for various shows who is best known for co-creating and hosting the internet talk show FishCenter Live, co-creating and starring in Tender Touches, and for creating and starring in Gēmusetto, all for Adult Swim. He is also the creator of Gilbert Garfield, an alternate reality game and web series hosted on YouTube.

== Background ==
In 2007, Simonet graduated from Sonoma Valley High School. Simonet attended Hampshire College in Massachusetts. He later moved to New York, attempted stand-up comedy, and became a graphic artist for satirical news agency The Onion.

== Career ==
Simonet co-created and hosted the American internet series FishCenter Live alongside Dave Bonawits, Andrew Choe, Matt Harrigan, and Christina 'Tina' Loranger, which streamed live weekdays on Adult Swim's website from 2014 to 2020. Simonet also developed Daytime Fighting League and co-hosted Bloodfeast with Bonawits for the website. Simonet co-created the 2017 television series Tender Touches, an animated spin-off of Bloodfeast, with Dave Bonawits and Lauren Payne, also voicing the main character Steve. Simonet also created Gēmusetto for Adult Swim, which premiered as the network's 2019 April Fools prank. In the series, Simonet voices the main character Makasu. In 2020, Simonet co-hosted the Adult Swim Podcast with Matt Harrigan. In May 2022, Max began posting Gilbert Garfield videos on YouTube. He left Adult Swim in October 2022. In 2024 he began streaming on Twitch.tv under the username Rat Cousin.

== Filmography ==
| Year | Title | Role | Notes |
|---|---|---|---|
| 2014–2020 | FishCenter Live | Himself (co-host) | Also co-creator |
| 2015–2020 | Bloodfeast | Himself (co-host) | Previously titled Dave and the Crossword Guys, later Crossword |
| 2016–2017 | Daytime Fighting League | Himself (co-host) | Also producer |
| 2017–2020 | Tender Touches | Steve Mendolsonn (voice) | Also co-creator, director, writer |
| 2019–2020 | Gēmusetto | Makasu, Old Rat (voices) | Also creator, director, writer, editor |
| 2020 | Truthpoint: Darkweb Rising | Himself (field correspondent) | 2 episodes |
| 2020 | 12 oz. Mouse | Pineapples (voice) | Appears in Season 3 |
| 2022–2025 | Gilbert Garfield | Max | Creator, actor |

== See also ==
- List of talk show hosts
