= Assy McGee =

American adult animated sitcom

- Created by: Matt Harrigan; Carl W. Adams
- Voices of: Larry Murphy; H. Jon Benjamin; Carl W. Adams; Jen Cohn
- Country of origin: United States
- No. of seasons: 2
- No. of episodes: 20

Production
- Running time: 11 minutes
- Production companies: Soup2Nuts (season 1); Clambake Animation (season 2); Williams Street

Original release
- Network: Adult Swim
- Release: November 26, 2006 – July 6, 2008

Assy McGee is an American adult animated sitcom created by Carl W. Adams and Matt Harrigan for Cartoon Network's late-night programming block Adult Swim. Produced by Soup2Nuts. The series features a police detective named Assy McGee, a parody of tough cops, who is a walking pair of buttocks. Along with his partner Don Sanchez (modeled after Luis Guzmán), the trigger-happy McGee solves crimes in the town of Exeter, New Hampshire. It ran on Adult Swim from November 26, 2006, to July 6, 2008.

== Premise and episode structure ==
The series revolves around the antics of Assy McGee, an ultra-violent and emotionally disturbed police detective who happens to have no upper torso, head, or arms. With the help of his partner Sanchez (often against the wishes of his superior officers), Assy patrols the streets of Exeter, New Hampshire, although it bears a stronger resemblance to a larger city such as New York City or Chicago.

Cases usually involve outlandish or exaggerated crimes, usually shown in the opening scene. Assy will then be delegated with investigating the crimes, typically doing so by immersing himself into matters that seemingly serve little or no relevance to the crime at hand, until at the end of the episode, it's revealed that the random innocent bystander that Assy has violently accosted has been the culprit all along or another wanted criminal.

Assy is almost always opposed by his chief until his actions are validated. This leads the Chief to inquire as to how Assy could possibly know this person was the responsible culprit, Assy usually affirming that he knew, but without any evidence to support the claim.

== Characters ==
- Assy McGee (Larry Murphy) – a walking, talking lower torso with exposed buttocks. Horribly violent, an alcoholic and clinically depressed, Assy is a parody of the 1970s/1980s movie cops as seen in such films as Dirty Harry, Lethal Weapon and Cobra: trigger-happy, tough, at times hopelessly depressed, and in conflict with his fellow officers as often as he is in conflict with crime. Assy has a slurred style of speech similar to Sylvester Stallone, though it is "gassy" sounding and muffled, possibly due to his anatomy or inebriation (or both), but he has been shown to have an excellent ability to sing classical music. He also quotes and mimics some of Stallone's most memorable characters, shouting Judge Dredd's catchphrase "I am the law!" in episode five, "Mexican Rain" and reenacts the Rocky training scene in episode seven "Ring of Fire".
- Detective Don Sanchez (Larry Murphy) – Assy's partner and a version of the good cop stereotype. He has a wife and three children, including a son named Rudolpho and a daughter named Giselle, and often finds himself playing (unsuccessfully) the voice of reason to Assy. Sanchez is a loyal partner to Assy, often talking to Assy about a case in the middle of the night and is highly tolerant of Assy's antics no matter how much trouble they get him in.
- Greg "The Chief" (Larry Murphy) – almost always referred to as "The Chief" (who bears a resemblance to Al Pacino), is the chief of the Exeter police department. He often argues with Assy over cases, yet is mesmerized when Assy is able to solve a case.
- The Mayor (H. Jon Benjamin) – The African-American mayor of the city, as the head of Exeter, the Mayor is corrupt and idiotic. He is also obsessed with re-election and will disregard or manipulate the facts of a case in order to further his political career. The Mayor also frequents "massage parlors" that are under police investigation for being fronts for prostitution.
- Officer DiLorenzo (Carl W. Adams) – a heavy-set, thick-headed, light-skinned police officer for the Exeter police department. DiLorenzo often teases Assy and doubts his actions. He seemed to be a rather hated person in the Exeter police department, as Assy and the other officers are known to refer to him as "DiRetardo" as a result in numerous episodes, to DiLorenzo's chagrin. Despite this, he seems to be a hard worker during appropriate times. He was instructed by the chief to follow Assy around while Detective Sanchez was in the hospital following a heart attack. In "Pharmassy", DiLorenzo's improv as a pizza guy prevents the Mayor of Exeter from getting shot; however, the result gets DiLorenzo gunned down instead, causing the other officers to cheer and hand money to each other (although he survived as evident in "Mile High Mayhem"). DiLorenzo is also a good singer, as he demonstrates it during Glen's funeral in the episode "Irish Wake".
- Glen (Carl W. Adams) – (1975 – May 11, 2008) was the split-eyed bartender for Bill W's, the bar that Assy often attends in the show. In Season 1, Glen once bailed Assy out of prison, despite being the person responsible for putting him in there in the first place. He also made Assy walk home from the prison afterwards. In "Irish Wake", Glen was tragically murdered by an Irish bookie named Mikey O’Brien after failing to pay up loans for losing wagers, although he was replaced with a different bartender soon after.
- "The Father" – (a priest) is the currently nameless religious figure from whom Assy often seeks spiritual healing & guidance. He is usually found sitting at the bar in Bill W's.
- Ling (Jen Cohn) – a Japanese woman (wearing only a terry cloth robe) who runs a massage parlor/brothel that Assy frequents. She appears to be one of Assy's underground sources/informants (and it is implied she provides him with information and her "services" in exchange for Assy looking the other way). In the first episode, she had a group of ninjas working for her (until they are gunned down by Assy for attacking Sanchez). While Assy is getting a massage by her employee Suki, she had them attack Sanchez after he inquired about the Massage Parlor's founder—a hooker named Abigail who was accidentally killed (due to an allergic reaction to black soot) by President John Adams in 1799, only for her body to be discovered in modern-day Exeter. After killing the ninjas, Assy and Sanchez chase down the massage therapist after she flees. They catch her and at gunpoint, she reveals that John Adams was Abigail's killer. In later episodes, she is more forthcoming with information and gives Assy massages herself.

== Development ==
The idea for Assy McGee came to co-creator Carl W. Adams around 2005, while working at Soup2Nuts, which had recently been purchased by Scholastic. Adams had previously worked on Dr. Katz, Professional Therapist, and Home Movies, both produced by Tom Snyder Productions (later Soup2Nuts.) Having previously worked with Williams Street on Home Movies, Adams was able to pitch the show to Adult Swim, who agreed to buy it.

After the first six episodes were produced at Soup2Nuts, Scholastic executives became aware of the graphic violence, sexual content and controversial depictions of religion present throughout, and intervened to cancel production of any future episodes, leaving the six completed episodes as season 1.

Scholastic turned over the rights to the intellectual property back to Adams, who then founded Clambake Animation in Watertown, Massachusetts, along with André Lyman and Carrie Snyder, both of Soup2Nuts. Assy McGee was initially Clambake's only project, later going on to develop Southies, also for Adult Swim, as part of their Smalls series.

== Episodes ==
Season	Episodes	Originally released	
Season	Episodes	First released	Last released
1	6	November 26, 2006	January 7, 2007
2	14	April 6, 2008	July 6, 2008

=== Season 1 (2006–07) ===
No. overall	No. in season	Title	Original release date	Prod. code
1	1	"Murder on the Docks"	November 26, 2006	101
The skeleton of a dead hooker is found near the docks by some children playing ball. It happens a day before a parade commemorating President John Adams. Assy shows up on the scene and shoots every nearby cop. Despite being suspended by the chief for doing so, Assy investigates the case of the hooker anyway. What he fails to realize throughout the investigation is that the hooker was already killed by none other than president John Adams in 1799. He falsely accuses an actor named John Adams in the parade dressed as president Adams and shoots him. Coincidentally, the man Assy shot was wanted in 28 states, so the chief ends up reinstating him. It is revealed during the episode that the chief's actual name is Greg.
2	2	"The Flirty Black Man"	December 3, 2006	102
When the priceless self-portrait of Lamont Dakota's "The Flirty Black Man" is stolen, Assy decides to take the case even though he's been ordered not to. The thief turns out to be Paddle Nine, an art thief, but Assy is unable to apprehend him. Assy also destroys the painting in his attempt by accidentally shooting out his eye. Assy's artistic talents are revealed in this episode. This episode also marks the debut of Bill W's Bar.
3	3	"Game of Death"	December 10, 2006	103
A Cuban dignitary is visiting the city for a soccer match and Assy is assigned to bodyguard him. However, Assy's history with the game of soccer and his alleged Cuban heritage complicate his assignment. In the end, Assy, after saying "Adios... Blimp!", takes down a blimp which he assumes is for terrorist use, which puts the dignitary in a body cast when it comes down. Assy nearly loses his badge for his actions. Assy's singing talents are revealed in this episode.
4	4	"Busted"	December 17, 2006	104
The start of the episode shows two criminals robbing people on a bus, but they get more than they bargained for when Assy shows up and shoots one of them. Assy then goes to track down the criminal that escaped and finds out who the mastermind is, Baby Steps. The episode ends with Assy trying to get the boss convicted, but they end up going free on a technicality as the raid on the robber's home was done illegally, and because Assy roughed up Baby Steps' employee in order to get the answers. At the end of the episode, Assy shows off more of his musical talents by playing the harmonica inside Bill W's.
5	5	"Mexican Rain"	December 24, 2006	105
Detective Sanchez has a heart attack due to Mexicans falling out of his kid's pinata. The chief announces that a man known as "El Coyote" is responsible for smuggling these Mexicans into America. At the hospital, Sanchez tells Assy that the Mexicans are being smuggled in via cheap knick knacks. Later, Assy hitchhikes with a person who may or may not be El Coyote and kills him. At the end, Assy tries to sing with a mariachi band at the bar, but passes out before he sings.
6	6	"Conviction"	January 7, 2007	106
Assy inadvertently becomes the model for Conviction Cologne, which is being used by a group of priests, headed by "The Archbishop", to make teenagers into addicts. Assy smokes the cologne through a hookah pipe which, consequently, causes him to hallucinate. Sobered up by Detective Sanchez, Assy foils the priests' plan, having a baby shoot the archbishop (which he thought would be funny).

=== Season 2 (2008) ===
No. overall	No. in season	Title	Original release date	Prod. code
7	1	"Ring of Fire"	April 6, 2008	107
Several boxers in Exeter die in the ring from self-induced beatings, leading Assy to discover that the next door deli has been contaminated with radioactive waste and that the deli workers are responsible for the deaths of the pugilists. This episode marks the debut of Assy's humor based in-show Scion advertisements, which would also be featured in subsequent episodes.
8	2	"Pharmassy"	April 13, 2008	109
Assy must abandon his five-year-in-planning ice fishing vacation to resolve a dangerous hostage situation. Things become even more complicated when a slip-of-the-tongue from Officer DiLorenzo reveals to the gunman (Jasper) that one of his hostages is in fact the Mayor of Exeter. Jasper, the gunman, is voiced by H. Jon Benjamin.
9	3	"Mile High Mayhem"	April 20, 2008	110
Assy and Sanchez join the Federal Air Marshal division and go undercover on a flight to try solve a drug smuggling operation.
10	4	"Murder On The Midway"	April 27, 2008	111
Sanchez’s daughter ends up in danger during an explosion on a ferris wheel at a carnival in Exeter. The pair struggle to both save her and subdue a rogue fire-fighter terrorist.
11	5	"Pegfinger"	May 4, 2008	108
After a series of violent assaults, Detective McGee must rely on an unlikely ally; a criminal he put behind bars years ago. The investigation leads them to a theater production of The Pirates of Penzance, and Sanchez confirms suspicions that his wife Brenda is having an affair.
12	6	"Irish Wake"	May 11, 2008	114
When Glen the bartender is killed, the police force looks to avenge his death. Sanchez gets a new partner while Assy is off grieving and drinking. The episode references The Departed, The Wire and The Godfather.
13	7	"Vowel Play"	May 18, 2008	113
Chaos unfolds at the annual Exeter Spelling Bee as the champion, a boy named Gordon, disappears. Assy’s investigation leads to a Chinese bar, where a Russian roulette scene pays homage to The Deer Hunter.
14	8	"Hands Up"	May 25, 2008	115
Assy is placed on suspension after shooting a paraplegic at a police event. He later uncovers a plot to steal old people from hospitals. Assy quits the force and is later hit by a bus, ending up in the hospital where the kidnapping crimes originate, allowing him to solve the case.
15	9	"Bikes for Bombs"	June 1, 2008	112
Assy uncovers a rogue government organization intent on destabilizing foreign regimes while trying to track down his stolen bicycle.
16	10	"Showdown in Magic City"	June 8, 2008	117
Assy and Sanchez are sent to Miami to investigate a crime syndicate. Members of the syndicate abduct Sanchez, taking him back to Exeter. Assy returns home to track down his partner and search for the criminals.
17	11	"The Ballad of Blind Anthony"	June 15, 2008	116
Babysteps abducts a blind choir singer named blind Anthony and performs an illegal surgery to swap his vocals chords with his son in order to improve his son's singing voice.
18	12	"Johnny Arson"	June 22, 2008	118
When a serial arsonist targets Exeter, Assy's new Internet lover is the number one suspect. At the end we see Sanchez driving away from a pharmacy on fire.
19	13	"The Assy Diaries"	June 29, 2008	119
Corrupt police are extorting money from nannies within the city. As Assy investigates, he is targeted for assassination and attacked with a chainsaw in a children’s ball pool and his legs are severed, nearly killing him. Later we see Assy in his bath at home sewing his legs back on.
20	14	"Squirrels"	July 6, 2008	120
Whilst hunting, Assy and Sanchez discover an underground squirrel fighting ring. Assy must face his fears of squirrels to solve the crime.

== Broadcast ==
Assy McGee aired in the 11:30 PM ET Sunday slot for its first season, and in the 12:30 AM ET Monday slot for its second.

In Canada, Assy McGee previously aired on Teletoon's Teletoon at Night block and in 2018 aired on the Canadian version of Adult Swim. It was also aired in South Korea on The Pop Factory at 9:30 P.M. on the late-night programming block TPF @ Night (팝 팩토리) starting in 2008. In the UK, it aired on the BBC One and BBC Two channels. In Turkey. it premiered on CNBC-e in 2010.

== Home Release ==
All 20 episodes were released on DVD in Australia on November 28, 2012, as part of the Adult Swim Grab Bag Collection, where it was titled Assy McGee Series 1 and 2: The Complete Spread.
