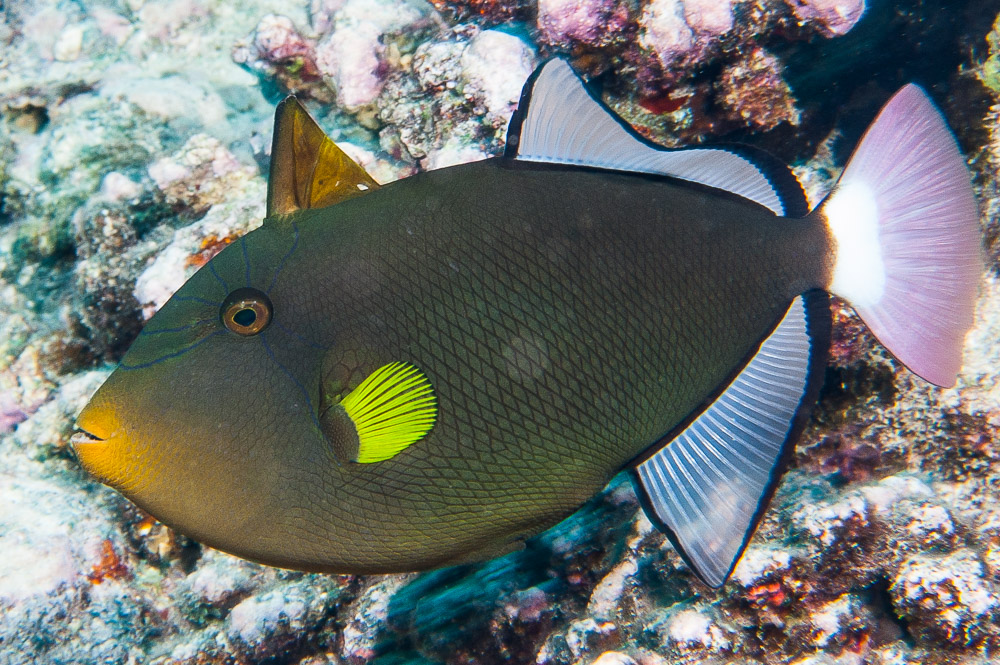

Scientific classification
- Kingdom: Animalia
- Phylum: Chordata
- Class: Actinopterygii
- Order: Tetraodontiformes
- Family: Balistidae
- Genus: Melichthys
- Species: M. vidua

Binomial name
- Melichthys vidua (Richardson, 1845)

Synonyms
- Balistes vidua (Richardson, 1845); Balistes vidua kamoharai Abe, 1958; Melichthys indicus Randall & Klausewitz, 1974; Oncobalistes erythropterus Fowler, 1946; Pachynathus nycteris Jordan & Evermann, 1903

= Pinktail triggerfish =

Species of fish

The pinktail triggerfish (Melichthys vidua) is a species of triggerfish native to the Indo-Pacific region. It is very dark green (often appearing almost black), with translucent white anal and second dorsal fins and a pink caudal fin (from which it gets its common name). This fish is found exclusively around shallow reefs, where it spends its entire life.

== Description ==
The pinktail triggerfish has an oval body and may grow up to 40 cm (16 in) in length, and is not sexually dimorphic. Like all triggerfish species, the first dorsal fin is composed of three spines that can be “triggered” up and down (to lock the fish inside crevices to thwart predators when necessary), and the anal and second dorsal fins, undulating left and right, serve as the primary method of locomotion. The caudal fin, notably pink, can be splayed from a squared to a wide rounded, almost truncated shape for different burst movement options. The pectoral fins are rather unremarkable (apart from being bright green), and the pelvic fins are nearly invisible, being quietly tucked underneath the ventral side. The pinktail triggerfish has a small terminal mouth, as well as small eyes, and the body is covered in tough cycloid scales.

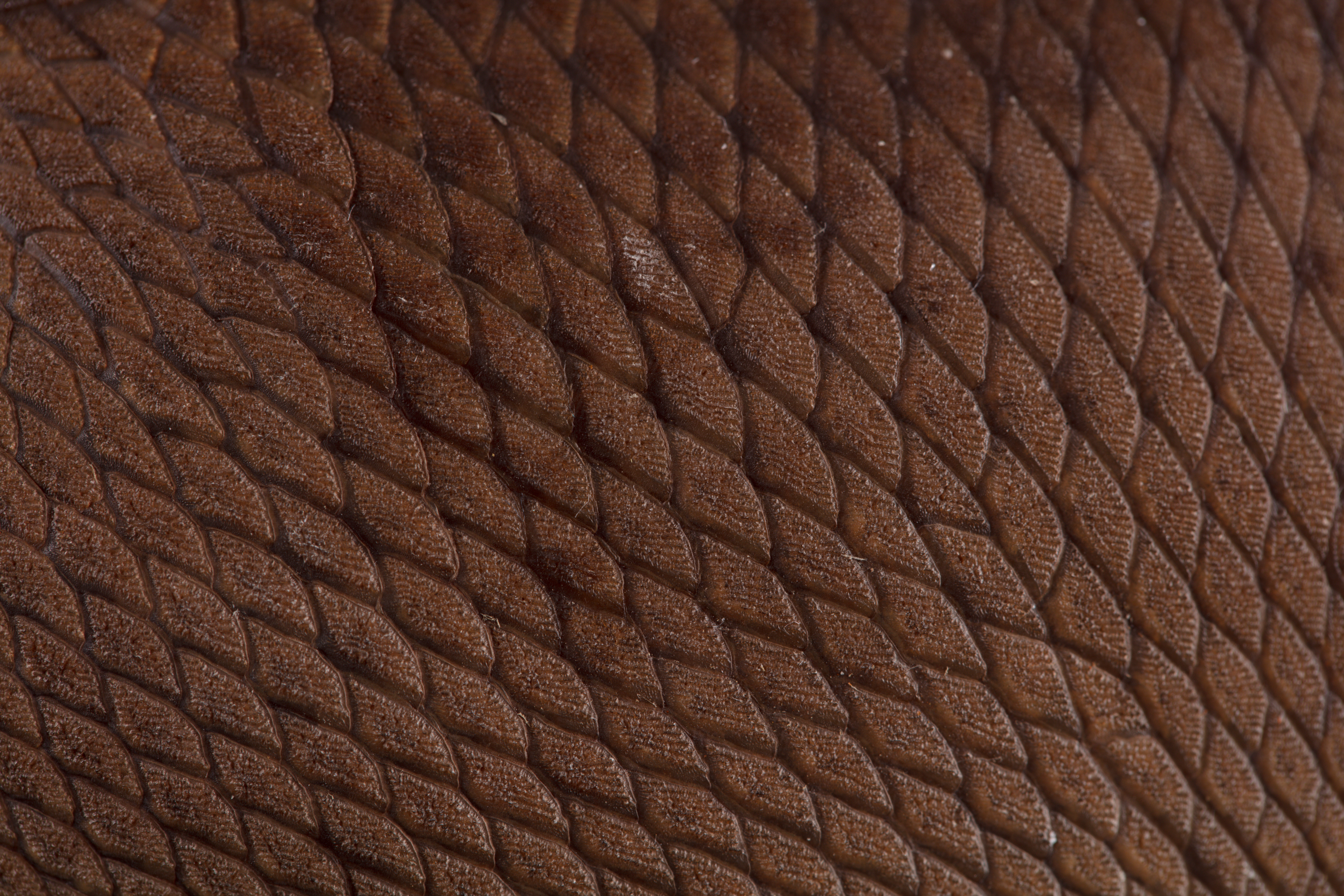
Cycloid scales of Melichthys vidua

== Distribution and habitat ==
The pinktail triggerfish is found throughout the Indian and Pacific Oceans. The greatest population density occurs around Indonesia and Oceania, but this fish can be found as far west as East Africa, as far east as the western coast of Panama, and as far north as southern Japan.

The pinktail triggerfish lives exclusively in shallow coral reefs, preferring reef slope edges near the surface. This is likely due to its planktivore diet, where currents from more open ocean can provide a constant supply of plankton. Adults prefer areas with large corals, while juveniles prefer rockier parts of the reef, as they provide better cover against predators.

== Ecology ==
The pinktail triggerfish is a planktivore, feeding on microalgae especially. This is somewhat unique among triggerfish, as a majority of species consume hard-shelled invertebrates like crabs and urchins with their crushing teeth. The pinktail triggerfish is also ovivorous, and is known to follow spawning fish individually and in pairs to consume the eggs. Species whose eggs are prone to predation by the pinktail triggerfish come from a wide range of orders, and include Aulostomus chinensis, Parupeneus bifasciatum, Chlorurus sordidus, Acanthurus nigroris, Bothus mancus and Ostracion meleagris. The preference for these fish species was determined to be due to the fact that they spawn in pairs, which correlates with larger egg sizes.

To avoid reef predators like sharks and eels, the pinktail triggerfish activates their trigger-like dorsal spines to lock them inside crevices until the threat has passed. In addition, their large spines, tough scales, and body plan make them difficult for predators to grab onto and swallow.

The pinktail triggerfish has to deal a range of parasites, some of which must complete part of their life-cycle inside of a fish host. In particular, the trematode species Lepocreadium clavatum and Opisthogonoporis vitellosus were described from specimens parasitizing a pinktail triggerfish.

== Life history ==
While not much is known about breeding and spawning habits specific to this fish, the common sexual behaviors of other triggerfish species can be extrapolated onto it. Triggerfish build nests for their eggs, and males become extremely defensive of their territory, even toward fishes and other animals many times larger than themselves (aquarium owners have reported that this fish acts less territorial than other species of triggerfish, however). The nest built is usually dug out of sand on the ocean floor, but can also be made from existing space in rocky reefs. When spawning, both the male and the female rub their abdomens on the bottom of the nest to release and fertilize the eggs. Once the eggs have been fertilized, the female tends to the eggs by constantly moving them to provide a constant source of oxygen, while the male patrols the territory and keep away egg predators. After the eggs hatch, the fry swim off on their own to safer parts of the reef with more cover.

== Relationship with humans ==
The pinktail triggerfish is listed as a Least Concern species by the International Union for Conservation (IUCN) due to the large population, widespread range, and relative indifference from humans (due to its inedibility: it contains ciguatoxins and palytoxin, both of which originate from its microalgae diet). There are, however, a few threats that could perhaps change this listing, for example the continued death of corals and degradation of coral reefs due to climate change and ocean acidification, which can result in habitat loss.

The pinktail triggerfish can be found in the aquarium trade, and all individuals are wild-caught. However, so far there is only one fishery in Micronesia that harvests them, and it is reported that it follows sustainable fishing practices.
