= Matt Harrigan =

American producer and actor (born 1969)

- Born: July 21, 1969 (age 56); Manchester, New Hampshire, U.S.
- Occupations: VP of Digital Content at Adult Swim
- Notable work: Perfect Hair Forever; Assy McGee; Cheyenne Cinnamon; Space Ghost Coast to Coast; FishCenter Live

Matthew "Matt" Harrigan (born July 21, 1969) is an American television writer, producer, and voice actor who is best known for his work on shows like Space Ghost Coast to Coast, Late Show with David Letterman and Celebrity Deathmatch. He was also the television host of FishCenter Live.

== Career ==
Harrigan has worked as a producer on several shows for Williams Street and was the founder of the short lived studio Williams Street West. He was the Adult Swim creative director. He also wrote numerous episodes of the series, Space Ghost Coast to Coast (including the entirety of the eighth season).

Harrigan's animated television series Assy McGee premiered in November 2006. In addition, he performed the voice of the regular character, Liquor, in 12 oz. Mouse, the Major Shake Replicant in two episodes of Aqua Teen Hunger Force and the voice of Linda in the Aqua Teen Hunger Force Colon Movie Film for Theaters. In 2009, he created another series with Dave Willis called Cheyenne Cinnamon that premiered in March 2010. After winning the online Burger King vote which was supposed to air around May 9, it was not picked up as a full series. He is also the creator of FishCenter Live and hosted it alongside Dave Bonawits, Andrew Choe, Christina Loranger, and Max Simonet from 2014 to 2020, and, as the VP of Digital Content for the network, led the development of the Adult Swim Streams, a free live stream consisting of several online-exclusive originals, of which FishCenter Live was the flagship program. Harrigan was one of many Adult Swim employees to be laid off in November 2020, a move that led to the discontinuation of the Adult Swim Streams.

== Filmography ==
=== Television ===
Year	Title	Role	Notes
1994–2004	Space Ghost Coast to Coast	Jace	Writer, producer, voice actor, executive producer
1996–1997	Late Show with David Letterman		Writer
1996–2000	KaBlam!		Writer
1997-1998	Cartoon Sushi		Writer & voice actor
1998–2002	Celebrity Deathmatch		Head writer
2000–2007	Harvey Birdman, Attorney at Law		Executive producer
2002–2003	Aqua Teen Hunger Force	Major Shake-replicant (voice) 2 episodes	Voice actor
2004	Adult Swim Brain Trust	Caller (voice)	Voice actor
2004	Perfect Hair Forever	Model Robot (voice) 4 episodes	Creator, producer, director, writer & voice actor
2004–2006	Tom Goes to the Mayor		Executive producer
2005	12 oz. Mouse	Liquor (voice) 6 episodes	Voice actor, & writer
2005	Squidbillies	Additional story elements	
2006–2008	Assy McGee		Creator, writer & executive producer
2006–2010	Tim and Eric Awesome Show, Great Job!		Executive producer, Actor in 1 episode
2007	Lowe Country	Himself	Executive producer, Director, Creator
2010	Cheyenne Cinnamon		Co-creator, writer, producer
2011	Family Guy	1 episode; New Kidney in Town	Writer
2014–2020	FishCenter Live		Creator & Host

=== Film ===
Year	Title	Role	Notes
2007	Aqua Teen Hunger Force Colon Movie Film for Theaters	Linda	Voice

=== Video games ===
Year	Title	Role	Notes
2003	Celebrity Deathmatch	Writer	

== See also ==
- List of talk show hosts
