= Geek Monthly =

American print magazine

- Categories: Celebrity magazine, online magazine
- Frequency: Monthly
- Founded: 2006
- Final issue: October 2014
- Company: Geek Media Ventures/Source Interlink Media
- Country: United States
- Language: English
- Website: geekexchange.com
- ISSN: 1933-0197

Geek Monthly was an American print magazine that was launched in 2006 under the guidance of editor-in-chief Jeff Bond by CFQ Media, who was previously responsible for relaunching the classic science fiction/fantasy magazine Cinefantastique and its sister publication Femme Fatales. Geek Monthly later became part of Fusion Publishing, owner of the video gaming magazine Play.

"Geek Monthly" was a self-described microcosm of pop culture with a mission statement that make clear that the staff and contributors were "dedicated to anything and everything that geeks like you obsess about; like the latest Toys, Anime, TV shows, Movies, Games and DVDs." Some regular departments included Interface, Scope, Technobabble, Geekbits, Rants and Level Up. Special Issues included Toy Fair coverage, Comic Con, Back to School/fall TV, spring Big List issue. Geek celebrities were usually featured on the covers including Seth Green (from Robot Chicken, Party Monster, Without a Paddle and The Italian Job), Rainn Wilson, Greg Grunberg (from TV's Heroes), Kristen Bell (Veronica Mars), and 24's Mary Lynn Rajskub, Tina Fey and Anna Faris. The magazine was primarily distributed in print form on newsstands and bookstores, with a digital PDF edition available only to subscribers.

The October 2009 issue - featuring Ricky Gervais on the cover - was apparently damaged in printing, and was not distributed to subscribers or newsstands. It was only available via digital download.

In 2010, Fusion Publishing filed for Chapter 7 bankruptcy protection and ceased operations. Geek Monthly was later purchased by the creative partnership Geek Media Ventures. GMV brought the title to Source Interlink Media, which is the new publisher/distributor of the magazine.

Geek Monthly was relaunched as Geek Magazine on June 19, 2012.

David E. Williams was the editor-in-chief of the new publication, while Geek Monthly founding editor Jeff Bond returned as executive editor. 2012 issues were published in August, October and December.

As of October 2014 Geek Magazine discontinued digital and print publication.
