= List of programs broadcast by Cartoonito =

Cartoonito logo introduced on September 13, 2021.

This is a list of television programs broadcast on Cartoon Network and HBO Max's former preschool block, Cartoonito (and its predecessor unbranded block and Tickle U) in the United States.

== Final programming ==
=== Original programming ===
==== Warner Bros. Animation ====
Title	Premiere date	End date	Source(s)
Bugs Bunny Builders	July 25, 2022	May 23, 2025	(Note: Simultaneously premiered on both Cartoon Network and HBO Max.)
Batwheels	October 15, 2022	May 23, 2025	

=== Programming from PBS Kids ===
Title	Premiere date	End date	Source(s)
Sesame Street	November 11, 2021	May 23, 2025	(Note: Produced under Sesame Workshop.) (Note: As part of Sesame Workshop's deal with HBO which has been in agreement since 2016, newer seasons air on PBS Kids nine months after they premiere on HBO Max.) (Note: Exclusive to HBO Max.)

=== Acquired programming ===
Title	Premiere date	End date	Source(s)
Little Baby Bum	September 13, 2021	May 23, 2025	(Note: Has been on the platform since 2020.)
Mo Willems Storytime Shorts	September 13, 2021	May 23, 2025	
Vlad and Niki	March 18, 2022	May 23, 2025	
Bea's Block	February 15, 2024	May 23, 2025	
Hop	April 4, 2024	May 23, 2025	
Lu & the Bally Bunch	October 1, 2024	May 23, 2025	
Silly Sundays	October 2, 2024	May 23, 2025	
Let's Go, Bananas!	October 3, 2024	May 23, 2025	
Barney's World	October 14, 2024	May 23, 2025	(Note: Premiered on HBO Max on October 14, 2024, and on Cartoon Network on October 18, 2024.)
Dylan's Playtime Adventures	March 6, 2025	May 23, 2025	

=== Short-form programming ===
Title	Premiere date	End date	Source(s)
Batwheels shorts	September 5, 2022	May 23, 2025	
Bugs Bunny Builders shorts	October 31, 2022	May 23, 2025	

== Canceled programming ==
=== Original programming ===
==== Cartoon Network Studios ====
Title	Premiere date	Source(s)
Heyo BMO	Unaired	

==== Hanna-Barbera Studios Europe ====
Title	Premiere date	Source(s)
Foster's Funtime for Imaginary Friends	Unaired	
Barbara!	Unaired	

== Former programming ==
=== Original programming ===
==== Cartoon Network Studios ====
Title	Premiere date	End date	Source(s)
Jessica's Big Little World	September 20, 2023	January 20, 2025	(Note: Also aired on Cartoon Network.)

==== Warner Bros. Animation ====
Title	Premiere date	End date	Source(s)
Baby Looney Tunes	September 16, 2002	December 17, 2023	(Note: Originally aired on Cartoon Network and Kids' WB!. Rebranded as a Cartoonito original programming globally since 2006.) (Note: First unbranded run aired from April 21, 2003 to August 21, 2005, Tickle U run aired from August 22, 2005 to March 31, 2006, second unbranded run aired from April 3, 2006 to March 11, 2016, Cartoonito run aired from September 13, 2021 to June 3, 2022, and third unbranded run aired from September 25, 2023 to December 17, 2023.) (Note: Available on Max under the Cartoonito hub since September 13, 2021.)
Krypto the Superdog	March 25, 2005	March 19, 2010	(Note: Rebranded as a Cartoonito original programming globally since 2006.) (Note: First unbranded run aired from March 25 to August 21, 2005, Tickle U run aired from August 22, 2005 to March 31, 2006, and second unbranded run aired from April 3, 2006 to March 19, 2010.)
Firehouse Tales	August 22, 2005	August 17, 2006	(Note: Tickle U run aired from August 22, 2005 to March 31, 2006.)
Little Ellen	September 13, 2021	March 3, 2022	

=== Programming from Cartoon Network/Kids' WB! ===
==== Hanna-Barbera Cartoons ====
Title	Premiere date	End date	Source(s)
A Pup Named Scooby-Doo	January 17, 2006	March 31, 2006	
Tom & Jerry Kids	January 17, 2006	March 31, 2006	

=== Programming from PBS Kids ===
Title	Premiere date	End date	Source(s)
Caillou	September 13, 2021	May 4, 2022	
Esme & Roy	September 18, 2021	March 25, 2022	(Note: Formerly available on Max under the Cartoonito hub from September 18, 2021 to August 19, 2022.)
The Not-Too-Late Show with Elmo	January 28, 2022	March 25, 2022	(Note: Formerly available on Max under the Cartoonito hub from September 30, 2021 to August 19, 2022.)
Mecha Builders	April 30, 2022	November 24, 2023	

=== Acquired programming ===
Title	Premiere date	End date	Source(s)
Small World	June 2, 1996	May 26, 2002	
Big Bag	June 2, 1996	March 11, 2001	
Sitting Ducks	April 21, 2003	February 28, 2004	
Pecola	April 21, 2003	October 31, 2003	
Hamtaro	April 21, 2003	October 30, 2004	
Yoko! Jakamoko! Toto!	August 22, 2005	March 23, 2006	
Peppa Pig	August 22, 2005	January 21, 2007	
Little Robots	August 22, 2005	June 29, 2006	(Note: Tickle U run aired from August 22, 2005 to March 23, 2006.)
Gordon the Garden Gnome	August 22, 2005	January 13, 2006	
Care Bears: Unlock the Magic	April 16, 2019	October 21, 2024	(Note: Cartoonito run aired from September 19, 2021 to October 21, 2024.)
Bing	September 13, 2021	June 27, 2022	
Messy Goes to OKIDO	September 13, 2021	August 19, 2022	(Note: Has been on the platform since 2021.)
Mia's Magic Playground	September 13, 2021	August 19, 2022	
The Ollie & Moon Show	September 13, 2021	August 19, 2022	
Pocoyo	September 13, 2021	September 23, 2022	
Thomas & Friends: All Engines Go	September 13, 2021	December 15, 2023	
Love Monster	September 19, 2021	May 6, 2022	
Odo	December 2, 2021	August 19, 2022	
Cocomelon	January 31, 2022	February 16, 2024	

==== Canadian co-productions ====
Title	Premiere date	End date	Source(s)
Harry and His Bucket Full of Dinosaurs	August 22, 2005	May 3, 2007	
Gerald McBoing-Boing	August 22, 2005	August 18, 2006	
Mush-Mush and the Mushables	September 13, 2021	June 23, 2022	
Lucas the Spider	September 18, 2021	April 5, 2024	

=== Short-form programming ===
Title	Premiere date	End date	Source(s)
Alpha Bodies	September 13, 2021	2022	
The Beepers	September 13, 2021	2022	
Lucas the Spider shorts	September 13, 2021	2022	
Pocoyo shorts	September 13, 2021	2022	
Wide Load Vacay	September 13, 2021	2022	
Thomas & Friends: All Engines Go shorts	January 31, 2022	December 15, 2023	
Blippi Wonders	June 6, 2022	September 21, 2023	
Lellobee City Farm	June 6, 2022	April 11, 2024	

== See also ==
- List of programs broadcast by Cartoon Network
- List of programs broadcast by Adult Swim
- List of programs broadcast by Toonami
- List of programs broadcast by Boomerang
- List of programs broadcast by Discovery Family
- List of Sesame Workshop productions
