= List of programs broadcast by Toonami =

This is a list of programs that have been broadcast on Adult Swim's (formerly Cartoon Network's) Toonami programming block. Broadcast times and ranges shown are with respect to the United States' Eastern Time Zone based on Adult Swim's headquarters being located in this time zone. The broadcast times and ranges can also be used in conjunction with the Pacific Time Zone based on the network's West Coast feed.

== Animated series ==
Cartoon Network and Adult Swim have licensed a number of animated series for broadcast on the Toonami programming blocks over the years.

=== Anime ===
Title	Studio	Most Recent Licensee	Master Licensee	Airdate (Note: Air dates shown in this article are per the block's start time. For Saturday late night shows (e.g. May 26, 2012) that were effectively broadcast on Sunday morning (May 27, 2012), the date shown is for Saturday night. Adult Swim's Toonami promotes all of its series as airing on Saturday night, regardless of timeslot.)	Notes (Note: Shows are assumed to be edited for content unless specified in the Notes.)
The 08th MS Team	Sunrise	Bandai Namco Filmworks	Bandai Namco Filmworks	July 24, 2001	The first Toonami Midnight Run exclusive series. The final episode never aired.
Akame ga Kill!	White Fox	Sentai	Toho Animation	August 8, 2015	
Astro Boy (2003)	Tezuka Productions	Sony Pictures	Sony Pictures	March 8, 2004	The last series to premiere in the weekday version of Toonami. The episode "Eternal Boy" was not aired.
Assassination Classroom	Lerche	Crunchyroll	Fuji TV	August 29, 2020	
Attack on Titan	Wit Studio (seasons 1–3); MAPPA (season 4)	Crunchyroll	Kodansha	May 3, 2014	Returned for a second season on April 22, 2017. Returned for a third season on August 18, 2018. Returned for a final season on January 9, 2021.
Bakugan Battle Brawlers	TMS Entertainment / Japan Vistec	Nelvana	TMS Entertainment	March 22, 2008	Aired one episode on Toonami. The entire series aired on Saturday mornings.
The Big O	Sunrise	Sentai	Bandai Namco Filmworks	April 2, 2001	Season two was broadcast under Cartoon Network in 2003. It would broadcast under Toonami Adult Swim on July 27, 2013.
Black Clover	Pierrot	Crunchyroll	TV Tokyo	December 2, 2017	Went on hiatus after episode 136 due to dub delays caused by the COVID-19 pandemic. Returned on February 13, 2021.
Black Lagoon	Madhouse	Crunchyroll	NBCUniversal Entertainment Japan	March 22, 2014	
Black Lagoon: The Second Barrage	Madhouse	Crunchyroll	NBCUniversal Entertainment Japan	June 6, 2014	Broadcast as the second season of Black Lagoon.
Blade Runner: Black Lotus	Sola Digital Arts	Williams Street / Crunchyroll	Alcon Entertainment / Williams Street / Crunchyroll	November 13, 2021	
Bleach	Pierrot	Viz Media	Shogakukan-Shueisha	April 1, 2012; May 26, 2012	Episode was aired during the special Toonami April Fools 2012 event, then became a regular series on Toonami in May upon the block's revival.
Bleach: Thousand-Year Blood War	Pierrot	Viz Media	Shogakukan-Shueisha	May 17, 2025	Sequel series to Bleach.
Blue Dragon	Pierrot	Viz Media	TV Tokyo	March 29, 2008	Added to Toonami Jetstream until the service closed in January 2009.
Blue Exorcist	A-1 Pictures	Aniplex of America	Aniplex	February 22, 2014	
Blue Exorcist: Beyond the Snow Saga	Studio VOLN	Aniplex of America	Aniplex	November 9, 2025	Fourth season of Blue Exorcist.
Blue Exorcist: Kyoto Saga	A-1 Pictures	Aniplex of America	Aniplex	May 17, 2025	Second season of Blue Exorcist.
Blue Exorcist: Shimane Illuminati Saga	Studio VOLN	Aniplex of America	Aniplex	August 23, 2025	Third season of Blue Exorcist.
Blue Lock	Eight Bit	Crunchyroll	Bandai Namco Filmworks / Kodansha	February 7, 2026	Broadcast distribution by Sony Pictures.
Bobobo-bo Bo-bobo	Toei Animation	Discotek Media	Toei Animation	September 30, 2005	The only Toonami series to premiere on the Cartoon Network Fridays block.
Boruto: Naruto Next Generations	Pierrot	Viz Media	Shogakukan-Shueisha	September 29, 2018	Advertised as TV-14-LV, Aired as TV-PG
Cardcaptor Sakura	Madhouse	NIS America	Kodansha	June 4, 2001	The Nelvana-produced English dub which originally aired on Kids' WB was aired. Also branded as Cardcaptors.
Casshern Sins	Madhouse / Tatsunoko Production	Crunchyroll	Showgate	May 26, 2012	
Cowboy Bebop	Sunrise	Crunchyroll	Bandai Namco Filmworks	May 26, 2012	Episode 1 is presented in both English Dub and Japanese with English Sub. Previously aired on Adult Swim before Toonami's 2012 relaunch. Toonami started airing remastered episodes of Cowboy Bebop from early 2015, which contained fewer edits.
Cyborg 009	Japan Vistec	Discotek Media	Avex Pictures	June 30, 2003	Only first half of series on Toonami. Eventually moved to early Sunday mornings.
D.I.C.E.	Xebec	Bandai Entertainment	Bandai Namco Filmworks	January 22, 2005	
Dandadan	Science Saru	GKIDS	MBS Animation	July 26, 2025	Episode 14 airs with a special disclaimer, warning viewers about the content of the episode.
Deadman Wonderland	Manglobe	Crunchyroll	Kadokawa	May 26, 2012	First new series acquired for the 2012 Toonami block on Adult Swim.
Demon Slayer: Kimetsu no Yaiba	Ufotable	Aniplex of America	Aniplex	October 12, 2019	
Dimension W	Studio 3Hz & Orange	Crunchyroll	Bandai Namco Filmworks	February 27, 2016	
Dragon Ball	Toei Animation	Crunchyroll	Toei Animation	August 20, 2001	Aired reruns on Toonami Jetstream. Originally aired on syndication in September 1995, but it was cancelled after the first 13 episodes. On August 20, 2001, the original Dragon Ball anime was premiered on Toonami on Cartoon Network. The show was finished its complete run on December 1, 2003.
Dragon Ball Daima	Toei Animation	Crunchyroll	Toei Animation	June 14, 2025	Episode 3 is presented with burned-in closed captioning in the original broadcast. Premiered on June 14, 2025, at 12:30 am on Toonami on Adult Swim.
Dragon Ball GT	Toei Animation	Crunchyroll	Toei Animation	November 7, 2003	First 15 episodes were originally skipped. Instead, the series started with a recap episode called "A Grand Problem", which used scenes from the skipped episodes to summarize the story. The skipped episodes were later aired after the remaining episodes of the series had been broadcast. Also aired on Nicktoons.
Dragon Ball Super	Toei Animation	Crunchyroll	Toei Animation	January 7, 2017	The first OP and the first two EDs were presented in both English Dub and Japanese without English Sub. Premiered on January 7, 2017, at 8 pm on the regular Adult Swim schedule, with reruns at 11:30 pm on the Toonami block until episode 41, where first run episodes moved exclusively to Toonami.
Dragon Ball Z	Toei Animation	Crunchyroll	Toei Animation	August 31, 1998	Aired reruns on Toonami Jetstream. Originally aired on syndication from 1996 through 1998. Dragon Ball Z began aired on Toonami on Cartoon Network on August 31, 1998 in edited and later uncut versions. The show finished its complete run on April 7, 2003 and reruns of the show ran on Cartoon Network until it was removed from the line-up on March 22, 2008.
Dragon Ball Z Kai	Toei Animation	Crunchyroll	Toei Animation	November 8, 2014	Premiered 12 am/11c on November 8, 2014. Originally aired in an edited format on Nicktoons and The CW4Kids/Toonzai. Also aired on Toonami Rewind. Currently airing on Saturday night Toonami as of February 24, 2024. The show was removed from the Toonami lineup on March 8, 2025.
Dragon Ball Z Kai: The Final Chapters	Toei Animation	Crunchyroll	Toei Animation	January 7, 2017	Sequel series to Dragon Ball Z Kai broadcast internationally
Dr. Stone	TMS Entertainment / 8PAN / Die4Studio	Crunchyroll	TMS Entertainment	August 24, 2019	Returned for a second season on May 15, 2021. Returned for a third season on June 3, 2023.
Duel Masters	Studio Hibari & A.C.G.T	Hasbro Entertainment	Shogakukan-Shueisha	February 27, 2004	Last three episodes were never aired.
Eureka Seven	Bones	Crunchyroll	Bandai Namco Filmworks	August 18, 2012	Originally aired on Adult Swim from 2006 to 2008. The first anime to be re-licensed by Adult Swim after the original license expired. Series finale aired August 11, 2013, at 3 am/2c. The Toonami staff have stated that it is highly unlikely that the series will ever return to Adult Swim.
Eyeshield 21	Gallop	Viz Media	Shogakukan-Shueisha	December 17, 2007	Only five episodes aired on Toonami Jetstream.
Fena: Pirate Princess	Production I.G	Williams Street / Crunchyroll	Production I.G / Williams Street / Crunchyroll	August 14, 2021	
Fire Force	David Production	Crunchyroll	Kodansha	July 27, 2019	Returned for a second season on November 7, 2020.
FLCL	Gainax & Production I.G	Crunchyroll	King Records / Production I.G	October 26, 2013	Originally aired on Adult Swim in 2003. Toonami would premiere it in 2013 and announce that they would be co-producing two new seasons with Production I.G., whom they previously collaborated with for IGPX. Toonami started airing remastered episodes of FLCL from early 2018, which contained fewer edits.
FLCL Alternative	Production I.G, NUT & Revoroot	Williams Street	Production I.G	September 8, 2018	Episode 1 is presented in both English Dub and Japanese with English Sub. Second sequel series to FLCL. Co-produced and production assistance by Williams Street.
FLCL: Grunge	MontBlanc Pictures	Williams Street	Production I.G	September 9, 2023	Third sequel series to FLCL. Co-produced and production assistance by Williams Street.
FLCL Progressive	Production I.G	Williams Street	Production I.G	June 2, 2018	First sequel series to FLCL. Co-produced and production assistance by Williams Street.
FLCL: Shoegaze	Production I.G & NUT	Williams Street	Production I.G	September 30, 2023	Fourth sequel series to FLCL. Co-produced and production assistance by Williams Street.
Food Wars!: Shokugeki no Soma	J.C.Staff	Sentai Filmworks / Crunchyroll	Warner Bros. Japan	July 6, 2019	
Fullmetal Alchemist: Brotherhood	Bones	Crunchyroll / Aniplex of America	Aniplex	May 26, 2012	
Gachiakuta	Bones	Crunchyroll	Kodansha	October 17, 2026	Broadcast distribution by Sony Pictures.
G-Force: Guardians of Space	Tatsunoko Production	Cartoon Network	Tatsunoko Production	January 2, 2000	Cartoon Network's first-ever anime series from back in 1995, it made a brief (and last) re-appearance from January–March 2000 on the weekend edition of Toonami Midnight Run replacing Robotech and later Voltron. Only a handful of episodes were aired, as the show was brought in as mostly programming filler until the weekend TMR block was canceled in March 2000.
Ghost in the Shell: Stand Alone Complex	Production I.G	Bandai Entertainment / Manga Entertainment	Production I.G	August 4, 2012	Continues on the 2012 Toonami block of Adult Swim. The different seasons of Stand Alone Complex are treated as different shows altogether, though the storyline is intact and the two seasons appear to be rotating. The show returned on October 27, 2013. Episode 10, titled "Jungle Cruise" airs with a special disclaimer, warning viewers about the content of the episode.
Ghost in the Shell: S.A.C. 2nd GIG	Production I.G	Bandai Entertainment / Manga Entertainment	Production I.G	May 26, 2012	Episode 46 is presented in both English Dub and Japanese with English Sub. Second season of Ghost in the Shell. Continued from Adult Swim in the 2012 Toonami block, now concluded.
G Gundam	Sunrise	Bandai Namco Filmworks	Bandai Namco Filmworks	August 5, 2002	
Gundam 0080	Sunrise	Bandai Namco Filmworks	Bandai Namco Filmworks	November 6, 2001	Aired as part of the Midnight Run. Aired reruns on Adult Swim.
Gundam SEED	Sunrise	Bandai Namco Filmworks	Bandai Namco Filmworks	April 17, 2004	Only 26 episodes aired on Toonami.
Gundam Wing	Sunrise	Bandai Namco Filmworks	Bandai Namco Filmworks	March 6, 2000	First Toonami series to air an edited and unedited run on the block. Uncut version exclusive to Midnight Run block.
Gurren Lagann	Gainax	Aniplex of America	Aniplex	August 16, 2014	Originally aired on Syfy's Ani-Monday block from 2008 to 2011
.hack//SIGN	Bee Train	Crunchyroll	Bandai Namco Filmworks	February 1, 2003	
Hamtaro	TMS Entertainment	Viz Media	Shogakukan-Shueisha	June 3, 2002	Other half of series never aired or even dubbed due to low ratings.
Harlock Saga	Studio Z5 & Studio March	Central Park Media	Unknown	November 27, 2001	The six-episode series ran on Reactor 2.0.
Hellsing Ultimate	Satelight, Madhouse & Graphinica	Crunchyroll	NBCUniversal Entertainment Japan	September 13, 2014	Advertised as not planned to be edited for time.
Hikaru no Go	Pierrot	Viz Media	Shogakukan-Shueisha	July 17, 2006	A Toonami Jetstream-exclusive series, premiered on ImaginAsian TV. Final three episodes never aired due to Toonami Jetstream's going offline.
Housing Complex C	Akatsuki	Williams Street	Production I.G	October 2, 2022	Produced with production assistance by Williams Street.
Hunter × Hunter (2011)	Madhouse	Viz Media	Shogakukan-Shueisha	April 16, 2016	Episode 90 is presented in both English Dub and Japanese with English Sub.
IGPX (regular-series)	Production I.G	Discotek Media	Bandai Namco Filmworks / Production I.G. / Cartoon Network	November 5, 2005; April 27, 2013; November 12, 2023	Toonami's first original series. Returned to television on April 27, 2013, at 2 am/1c as part of Adult Swim's revived Toonami block. The HD remastered version by Discotek Media was first aired on November 12, 2023, to promote their Blu-Ray release in 2024, with the second season began airing on September 27, 2026. (Note: The HD remastered version was originally supposed to air on November 5, 2023, 18 years to the day the show first originally broadcast on the original Toonami block, as part of its DST bonus hour, but the first two episodes were aired commercial-free without the block's on-air branding package, due to the Toonami block ended pre-maturely at that time.)
InuYasha	Sunrise	Viz Media	Shogakukan-Shueisha	November 3, 2012	Originally aired as a daylight saving time filler. Originally aired on Adult Swim from August 31, 2002, to October 27, 2006, with reruns from 2006 to 2014. Reruns continued to air on the 2012 Toonami block on Adult Swim. Toonami started airing remastered episodes of InuYasha from early 2013, which contained fewer edits. Adult Swim's rights to the show expired on March 2, 2014, leaving the show's run unfinished at episode 127.
InuYasha: The Final Act	Sunrise	Viz Media	Shogakukan-Shueisha	November 15, 2014	Fifth season of InuYasha. Premiered at 2 am/1c on November 15, 2014.
JoJo's Bizarre Adventure	David Production	Viz Media	Shogakukan-Shueisha / Warner Bros. Japan	October 15, 2016	
JoJo's Bizarre Adventure: Diamond Is Unbreakable	David Production	Viz Media	Shogakukan-Shueisha / Warner Bros. Japan	August 16, 2018	Third season of Jojo's Bizarre Adventure.
JoJo's Bizarre Adventure: Golden Wind	David Production	Viz Media	Shogakukan-Shueisha / Warner Bros. Japan	October 26, 2019	Fourth season of Jojo's Bizarre Adventure Went on hiatus after episode 28 due to dub delays caused by the COVID-19 pandemic. Returned on August 1, 2020.
JoJo's Bizarre Adventure: Stardust Crusaders	David Production	Viz Media	Shogakukan-Shueisha / Warner Bros. Japan	July 29, 2017	Second season of Jojo's Bizarre Adventure. Episode 31 is presented in both English Dub and Japanese with English Sub.
Kiba	Madhouse	ADV Films / Upper Deck	Aniplex	July 14, 2008	A Toonami Jetstream-exclusive.
Kill la Kill	Studio Trigger	Aniplex of America	Aniplex	February 7, 2015	Premiered February 7, 2015, at 12:30/11:30c. Scenes in episodes 9, 11, 16, 18, 19, and 21 were edited for content.
Lazarus	MAPPA	Williams Street	MAPPA / Aniplex / Williams Street	April 5, 2025	Presented in both English Dub and Japanese with English Sub. Premiere episodes will air in English dub, while the Japanese version with English subtitles are aired in a marathon on July 12, 2025. Produced under commission by Sentai Studios.
Lupin the 3rd Part IV: The Italian Adventure	Telecom Animation Film	TMS Entertainment / Crunchyroll / Discotek Media	TMS Entertainment	June 17, 2017	Based on the Italian version.
Lupin the 3rd Part V: Misadventures in France	Telecom Animation Film	TMS Entertainment / Discotek Media	TMS Entertainment	June 15, 2019	
Lupin the 3rd Part 6	TMS Entertainment	TMS Entertainment / Sentai	TMS Entertainment	April 16, 2022	
Lycoris Recoil	A-1 Pictures	Aniplex of America	Aniplex	January 20, 2024	
Made in Abyss	Kinema Citrus	Sentai	Kadokawa	January 15, 2022	
MÄR	SynergySP	Viz Media	Shogakukan-Shueisha	July 14, 2006	A Toonami Jetstream exclusive. Briefly aired on Toonami.
Mashle	A-1 Pictures	Aniplex of America	Aniplex	November 9, 2024	
Mega Man Star Force	Xebec	Viz Media	Capcom	July 23, 2007	Aired a faux-movie on Toonami. Aired biweekly on Toonami Jetstream.
Megalobox	TMS Entertainment	Viz Media	TMS Entertainment	December 8, 2018	
Michiko & Hatchin	Manglobe	Crunchyroll	Kadokawa	June 20, 2015	
Mob Psycho 100	Bones	Crunchyroll	Warner Bros. Japan	October 27, 2018	Aired again from May 2, 2020, to July 18, 2020.
Mobile Suit Gundam	Sunrise	Bandai Namco Filmworks	Bandai Namco Filmworks	July 23, 2001	Ran abbreviated due to the September 11 attacks. Also aired on Adult Swim. Never completed its run on either block.
Mobile Suit Gundam: Iron-Blooded Orphans	Sunrise	Bandai Namco Filmworks / Crunchyroll	Bandai Namco Filmworks	June 4, 2016	Returned for a second season in October 2017.
Mobile Suit Gundam: The Origin – Advent of the Red Comet	Sunrise	Bandai Namco Filmworks	Bandai Namco Filmworks	July 6, 2019	
Mobile Suit Gundam Unicorn RE:0096	Sunrise	Bandai Namco Filmworks	Bandai Namco Filmworks	January 7, 2017	
My Hero Academia	Bones	Crunchyroll	Toho Animation	May 5, 2018	
Naruto	Pierrot	Viz Media	Shogakukan-Shueisha	September 10, 2005 (Note: This is the program's premiere date on Cartoon Network's Toonami.); December 1, 2012 (Note: This is the program's premiere date on Adult Swim's Toonami.)	Aired on the original Toonami until it was discontinued. Reruns aired on Toonami Jetstream and later on Cartoon Network Video. On December 1, 2012, unedited Naruto episodes, starting from the first, began airing on Adult Swim's Toonami. Episode 140, titled "Two Heartbeats: Kabuto's Trap" airs with a special disclaimer, warning viewers about the content of the episode. On Toonami's official Tumblr account, it was confirmed Naruto would be leaving the Toonami lineup on November 30, 2013. In November 2013, Toonami's official Tumblr account confirmed it would be returning to the block in 2014, at 3 am/2c, rerunning the first 52 episodes before leaving the block once more. The uncut version aired on Toonami Rewind, then returned to Toonami on January 11, 2025. That is until on December 21, 2025, they've removed the original Naruto anime from the Toonami lineup again for a fourth time before the holidays. However, Episode 5 was aired in its edited format from its original run.
Naruto: Shippuden	Pierrot	Viz Media	Shogakukan-Shueisha	January 4, 2014	Episode 197 is presented in both English Dub and Japanese with English Sub. Sequel series to Naruto. Some episodes were advertised with a TV-14-DLSV rating, but most of them were rated TV-PG-DLSV. Aired on Disney XD in an edited version from October 28, 2009, to November 5, 2011, and Neon Alley from episode 99 to 338 from December 29, 2012, to March 25, 2016. Naruto Shippuden premiered on Toonami on January 4, 2014, the sequel finished its complete run on August 31, 2024 on Adult Swim.
Ninja Kamui	E&H Production	Williams Street	Williams Street / Aniplex	February 11, 2024	Presented in both English Dub and Japanese with English Sub. The English dubbed version aired at the start of the block, while the Japanese version aired at the end of the block. Produced under commission by Sentai Studios.
One Piece	Toei Animation	Crunchyroll	Toei Animation	April 23, 2005	Aired episodes from 4Kids version which originally aired on FoxBox/4Kids TV, then the Funimation/Crunchyroll version after the latter took over the project. Aired reruns on Toonami Airstream. Uncut version premiered on Adult Swim's Toonami on May 18, 2013, starting with episode 207. On March 18, 2017, the series ended its first run on Adult Swim at episode 384. Returned on January 22, 2022, with episode 517.
One-Punch Man	Madhouse (season 1); J.C.Staff (season 2)	Viz Media	Shogakukan-Shueisha	July 16, 2016	Returned for a second season on October 12, 2019.
Outlaw Star	Sunrise	Crunchyroll	Bandai Namco Filmworks	January 15, 2001	Episode 23, "Hot Springs of Planet Tenrei," was skipped during its original Toonami run. Returned on August 19, 2017, in HD.
Paranoia Agent	Madhouse	Crunchyroll	Tohokushinsha Film Corporation	April 25, 2020	Originally aired on Adult Swim from 2005 to 2007. Episode 8 airs with a special disclaimer, warning viewers about the content of the episode.
Parasyte -the maxim-	Madhouse	Sentai	Nippon TV	October 3, 2015	
Patlabor	Sunrise	Maiden Japan	Tohokushinsha Film Corporation	February 18, 2002	A second-cycle Toonami Reactor-exclusive.
Pokémon Chronicles	OLM	The Pokémon Company International	The Pokémon Company International	June 3, 2006	Also aired on Miguzi. Aired reruns on Toonami Jetstream.
Pokémon: Battle Frontier	OLM	The Pokémon Company International	The Pokémon Company International	October 28, 2006	Only aired very select episodes on Toonami. New episodes aired on the Saturday morning cartoon block. Aired reruns on Toonami Jetstream.
Pokémon: Indigo League	OLM	The Pokémon Company International	The Pokémon Company International	2002	Aired briefly on Toonami Jetstream as a special to promote Pokémon Snap for the Wii Virtual Console. These episodes originally aired in syndication and on Kids' WB!, and were rerun during the regular Cartoon Network schedule. The different seasons of Pokémon are for the most part treated as different shows altogether, even though the storyline is intact. The first thirteen seasons of Pokémon are currently in rotation on Boomerang, but the rights expired in early 2017 with the entire library moving to Disney XD.
Pokémon: Johto League Champions	OLM	The Pokémon Company International	The Pokémon Company International	June 4, 2007	Aired on Kids' WB!. Aired reruns on Toonami Jetstream.
Pokémon: The Johto Journeys	OLM	The Pokémon Company International	The Pokémon Company International	October 9, 2006	Originally aired on Kids' WB!, then reran during the regular Cartoon Network schedule. Aired reruns on Toonami Jetstream. The episodes classified as The Johto Journeys actually started from the Orange Islands episode "The Pokémon Water War", as that is the US production order season 3 debut.
Pokémon: Master Quest	OLM	The Pokémon Company International	The Pokémon Company International	June 16, 2008	Aired reruns on Toonami Jetstream.
Pop Team Epic	Kamikaze Douga	Crunchyroll	King Records	June 30, 2018	
The Prince of Tennis	Trans Arts	Crunchyroll	Shogakukan-Shueisha / ADK	July 14, 2006	A Toonami Jetstream-exclusive. Briefly aired on Toonami.
The Promised Neverland	CloverWorks	Aniplex of America	Aniplex	April 13, 2019	Returned for a second season on April 10, 2021.
Rave Master	Studio Deen	Tokyopop	Kodansha	June 5, 2004	
Record of Lodoss War	Madhouse	Media Blasters	Unknown	November 14, 2001	A Toonami Reactor-exclusive series.
Rick and Morty: The Anime	Studio Deen	Williams Street	Williams Street	August 17, 2024	Presented in both English Dub and Japanese with English Sub. Toonami aired the Japanese language version of the episodes with English subtitles, while the English dubbed versions were broadcast Thursday nights during the regular Adult Swim schedule. The English dub began airing regularly on Toonami starting November 2, 2024. Produced under commission by Sentai Studios.
Robotech	Tatsunoko Production	Harmony Gold USA	Tatsunoko Production / Harmony Gold USA	January 12, 1998	Only the Macross and The Robotech Masters story lines were aired.
Ronin Warriors	Sunrise	Discotek Media	Bandai Namco Filmworks	September 27, 1999	Originally syndicated in the US in 1995 and aired on the USA Network and Sci-Fi Channel, this was the first premiere series of the TOM-era of Toonami.
Rooster Fighter	Sanzigen & Sola Entertainment	Viz Media	Viz Media	March 14, 2026	
Rurouni Kenshin	Gallop	Aniplex of America	Aniplex	March 17, 2003	The first 48 episodes aired on Toonami, and episodes 49–62 aired on SVES. The final season was never aired for unknown reasons.
Sailor Moon	Toei Animation	Viz Media	Kodansha	June 1, 1998	Originally syndicated in the US in 1995 and aired on the USA Network from 1997 to 1998. The original WildBrain (formerly known as DiC Entertainment, Cookie Jar Group and DHX Media) and The Program Exchange-produced episodes, including the previously Canadian-exclusive "Lost Episodes" aired throughout 1998 and 1999. The Cloverway-produced Sailor Moon S and Super S aired in 2000 with two skipped episodes (which aired in later reruns). The Sailor Stars arc of the series never aired in the US. On May 31, 2024, Sailor Moon returned to Toonami for the first time in 23 years with an uncut version dubbed by Viz Media, which aired on Toonami Rewind until November 29, 2024. Sailor Moon returned to the main Toonami block on January 25, 2025. However, Toonami removed Sailor Moon from the lineup and replaced it with a double hour of Dragon Ball Daima at midnight and 12:30 AM and added Lazarus (Japanese with English subtitles) at 2:30 AM on July 19, 2025. On the following year of 2026, Adult Swim announced that reruns of the first season of Sailor Moon will return US television once again on February 23, 2026. However, they changed their minds to air Dragon Ball Daima at 5:00 AM through 6:00 AM on weekday mornings instead. They recently announced that Sailor Moon going to air on Adult Swim (outside of the Toonami block) on March 9th (March 10th) before Adult Swim's Sailor Moon license expires on May 31, 2026.
Samurai 7	Gonzo	Crunchyroll	Gonzo	August 18, 2012	Previously aired on Animania HD and IFC.
Samurai Champloo	Manglobe	Crunchyroll	FlyingDog	January 2, 2016	Previously aired on Adult Swim.
SD Gundam Force	Sunrise	Bandai Namco Filmworks / Cartoon Network	Bandai Namco Filmworks / Cartoon Network	September 1, 2003	The first 26 episodes aired on Toonami. First SD Gundam series to premiere outside Japan.
Shenmue: The Animation	Telecom Animation Film	Williams Street / Crunchyroll	TMS Entertainment / Williams Street / Crunchyroll	February 5, 2022	Produced under commission by Sentai Studios.
Soul Eater	Bones	Crunchyroll	Kadokawa	February 16, 2013	Previously aired on the Funimation Channel
Space Dandy	Bones	Crunchyroll	Bandai Namco Filmworks	January 4, 2014	Episode 10 is presented in both English Dub and Japanese with English Sub. First anime series to premiere on Toonami before its broadcast premiere in Japan. Also the first show in Toonami's extended 6.5 hour block. Returned January 27, 2018.
SSSS.Gridman	Studio Trigger	Crunchyroll	Tsuburaya Productions	January 16, 2021	
Star Blazers	Academy Productions & Group TAC	Voyager Entertainment	Voyager Entertainment	May 3, 2001	Aired on Reactor 1.0 and then Reactor 2.0
Sword Art Online	A-1 Pictures	Aniplex of America	Aniplex	July 27, 2013	
Sword Art Online II	A-1 Pictures	Aniplex of America	Aniplex	March 28, 2015	Second season of Sword Art Online. Premiered March 28, 2015, at 1 am/12c.
Sword Art Online: Alicization	A-1 Pictures	Aniplex of America	Aniplex	February 9, 2019	Third season of Sword Art Online. Premiered February 9, 2019, at 12:30 am/11:30c.
Sword Art Online: Alicization – War of Underworld	A-1 Pictures	Aniplex of America	Aniplex	January 18, 2020	Sequel series to Sword Art Online: Alicization, the third season of Sword Art Online. Its second cour premiered on November 7, 2020.
Tenchi in Tokyo	AIC	Crunchyroll	NBCUniversal Entertainment Japan	August 25, 2000	The second Tenchi Muyo! television series.
Tenchi Muyo!	AIC	Crunchyroll	NBCUniversal Entertainment Japan	July 3, 2000	The first two OVAs aired under this umbrella title. Episode six of the third OVA was aired on April 1, 2012.
Tenchi Muyo! GXP	AIC	Crunchyroll	NBCUniversal Entertainment Japan	November 10, 2012	First Tenchi series to air on Adult Swim's Toonami block.
Tenchi Universe	AIC	Crunchyroll	NBCUniversal Entertainment Japan	July 20, 2000	The Toonami name for the first Tenchi Muyo! television series.
Tokyo Ghoul	Pierrot	Crunchyroll	Pierrot	March 25, 2017	
Tokyo Ghoul √A	Pierrot	Crunchyroll	Pierrot	June 24, 2017	
Tokyo Revengers	Liden Films	Crunchyroll	Crunchyroll	February 7, 2026	Episodes 4 and 21 airs with a special disclaimer, warning viewers about the content of the episode. Broadcast distribution by Sony Pictures.
Transformers: Armada	Actas & NAS	Hasbro Entertainment	Hasbro Entertainment	August 23, 2002	
Transformers: Cybertron	Gonzo	Hasbro Entertainment	Hasbro Entertainment	July 2, 2005	Briefly returned to Toonami in a special marathon to promote the 2007Transformers film. Also aired on Kids' WB and G4.
Transformers: Energon	Actas	Hasbro Entertainment	Hasbro Entertainment	April 9, 2004	
Uzumaki	Fugaku / Akatsuki	Williams Street	Production I.G	September 28, 2024	Presented in both English Dub and Japanese with English Sub. Fifth anime series to premiere on Toonami before its broadcast premiere in Japan. Premiere episodes will be on Toonami in Japanese with English subtitles. English dub premieres will encore Thursday nights on Adult Swim, with a marathon being aired on Toonami on January 4, 2025.
Voltron	Toei Animation	World Events Productions	World Events Productions	March 17, 1997	First anime to ever be broadcast on Toonami.
Wind Breaker	CloverWorks	Aniplex of America	Aniplex	October 10, 2026	
Yashahime: Princess Half-Demon	Sunrise	Viz Media	Sunrise	June 26, 2021	Sequel series to InuYasha. Returned for a second season on July 30, 2022.
Yu-Gi-Oh!	Gallop	Konami Cross Media NY	TV Tokyo	August 6, 2005	Only six episodes aired on Toonami. The entire series aired on Kids' WB. Used to air on Vortexx and Nicktoons.
Yu-Gi-Oh! GX	Gallop	Konami Cross Media NY	TV Tokyo	October 28, 2006	Originally aired on the now-defunct Miguzi block. Midway during its second season, it moved to Toonami for new episodes, then the new episodes returned to Miguzi, however reruns continued to air on Toonami for a while. The first part of the third season aired on Toonami, then the show left Toonami and moved to Saturday mornings. Then the show exclusively aired on 4Kids TV. It then moved to The CW4Kids block, where it aired on Saturday mornings.
YuYu Hakusho	Pierrot	Crunchyroll	Shogakugan-Shueisha	March 3, 2003	Originally aired on Adult Swim, only the first 88 episodes aired on Toonami. The remaining episodes aired early Saturday mornings at 5:30 am.
Zatch Bell!	Toei Animation	Viz Media	Shogakukan-Shueisha / Toei Animation	March 5, 2005	Only the first 77 episodes aired on Toonami. Later a Toonami Jetstream exclusive.
Zoids: Chaotic Century	Xebec	Hasbro Entertainment / Viz Media	Shogakukan-Shueisha	July 29, 2002	Originally an early-morning series, the series premiered officially on Toonami in July 2002. The final episodes were part of an event in January 2003.
Zoids: New Century Zero	Xebec	Hasbro Entertainment / Viz Media	Shogakukan-Shueisha	November 5, 2001	
Zom 100: Bucket List of the Dead	Bug Films	Viz Media	Shogakukan-Shueisha	March 30, 2024	

=== Domestic and other animation ===
Title	Airdate	Notes
Ballmastrz: 9009	June 6, 2020	Aired as replacement filler due to the English dub of JoJo's Bizarre Adventure: Golden Wind being delayed after episode 28 due to the COVID-19 pandemic. The first Adult Swim original animated series to air on Toonami.
The Batman	April 2, 2005	New episodes aired on Kids' WB!.
Batman Beyond	October 1, 2001	Previously broadcast on Kids' WB!. Reruns aired on Hub Network.
Batman: The Animated Series	May 13, 2000	Previously broadcast on Fox Kids and Kids' WB!. Reruns aired on Hub Network.
Ben 10: Alien Force	May 24, 2008	Reruns aired on Toonami.
Beware the Batman	May 10, 2014	Premiered the night of May 10, 2014. New episodes began airing on July 27 with episode 12. The remaining episodes were burned off in an early morning marathon on September 28, 2014, as the series was being written off.
Cartoon Roulette	March 17, 1997	Roulette was composed of animated action shorts; included were Space Ghost, Superman (1940s), Birdman and the Galaxy Trio, The Herculoids, Shazzan, and The Impossibles.
Common Side Effects	March 1, 2025	Adult Swim original series. Repeats will air on Toonami.
Fantastic Four: World's Greatest Heroes	September 2, 2006	Moved to Cartoon Network Saturday mornings, then to Nicktoons.
Gēmusetto: Death Beat(s)	November 7, 2020	Second season of Adult Swim's original series Gēmusetto.
Gen:Lock	August 3, 2019	Season 1 only, originally released on Rooster Teeth. Season 2 moved to HBO Max.
Get Jiro	October 3, 2026	Episode 6, as well as certain parts in Episodes 9 and 10, are presented in Japanese with English Sub.
G.I. Joe	November 4, 2002	The 1980s series began airing on Cartoon Network in July 2002, but officially became a Toonami exclusive in November 2002. Reruns aired on Hub Network and Discovery Family.
Harley Quinn	August 7, 2021	Aired season 1 as a special marathon to promote the release of The Suicide Squad in theaters and on HBO Max. However, due to a broadcasting error, never aired the season finale. Also aired on Syfy. Currently airing on TNT.
He-Man and the Masters of the Universe	August 16, 2002	
Invincible Fight Girl	November 2, 2024	
Jackie Chan Adventures	April 17, 2004	Originally a part of Kids' WB. Aired on Toonami as a filler. Reruns have aired on Disney XD.
Justice League	June 2, 2003	
Justice League Unlimited	July 31, 2004	Sequel series to Justice League. Later heavily edited on Vortexx.
Megas XLR	May 1, 2004	Aired all episodes on Toonami except for a single episode, which aired on Miguzi. Aired on Toonami Jetstream.
My Adventures with Superman	July 8, 2023	Toonami broadcast encore runs of Season 1 episode premieres that broadcast on Adult Swim. Subsequent seasons premiered on Toonami.
The Powerpuff Girls (1998 series)	July 13, 1999	A Cartoon Network original series. Formerly aired on the revived version of Cartoon Planet and Boomerang.
Primal	November 28, 2020	Aired as a special Thanksgiving weekend marathon to celebrate the series' addition to HBO Max. Returned on May 14, 2022.
The Real Adventures of Jonny Quest	March 17, 1997	Originally on TBS, TNT, and Cartoon Network, it became a Toonami exclusive on launch.
ReBoot	March 15, 1999	Originally on ABC. The third and fourth seasons were Toonami-exclusives in the US.
Samurai Jack	December 28, 2002	Aired very few episodes on Toonami, including the premieres of the last four episodes. Aired on Toonami Jetstream in its entirety. Was the final program to air on the old Toonami. The series returned to Toonami in February 2014, after FLCL ended its second run. Previously aired on Boomerang. Season 5 premiered on Toonami in 2017.
Scavengers Reign	September 5, 2026	HBO Max original series. Aired three episodes a night for a month-long event.
Storm Hawks	July 21, 2007	Began mid-2007.
Star Wars: The Clone Wars	August 17, 2013	Premiered August 17, 2013, at 3 am/2c. First 56 episodes aired on the block. Episode 8, titled "Bombad Jedi", was skipped during the program's run.
Super Friends	October 5, 1998	Reruns have aired on USA Network's Cartoon Express and Boomerang.
Superman: The Animated Series	November 13, 2000	Originally aired on Kids' WB!. Heavily edited episodes ran on Disney XD and unedited episodes aired on Hub Network.
Sym-Bionic Titan	October 6, 2012	Originally aired on Cartoon Network's regular schedule. First western cartoon to air on Adult Swim's Toonami. The series was written off on September 27, 2014, preventing any future reruns of the series, and the last airing was July 20, 2014.
Teen Titans	July 3, 2004	Reruns formerly aired on Boomerang.
ThunderCats (1985)	March 17, 1997	First show to ever be broadcast on Toonami.
ThunderCats (2011)	October 6, 2012	Originally aired on Cartoon Network's regular schedule. Airing rights expired on July 21, 2013, after the airing of "Trails of Lion-O, Part 1", during the program's second run. Second run was never completed.
Transformers: Animated	February 15, 2008	Aired reruns on Toonami Jetstream with new episodes on Saturday mornings. Never aired on Toonami. Originally aired on Cartoon Network.
Beast Wars: Transformers	March 9, 1998	Originally airing in syndication, Toonami aired the series in a week-long special event, in which the final five episodes of the second season made their premiere in the US.
Unicorn: Warriors Eternal	May 6, 2023	Encore run of weekly episode premieres that will broadcast Thursday nights on Adult Swim.
Wulin Warriors	February 4, 2006	A Taiwanese puppet show. Aired two episodes, one each week, before removal from Toonami.

== Movies and specials ==
=== Microseries ===
Title	Airdate	Notes
The Intruder	September 18 – November 24, 2000	Eight-part series. Toonami's first Total Immersion Event. The first six parts ran daily from September 18–22, 2000, followed by the Absolution Afterburn Sweepstakes. Episodes seven and eight ran on November 6, 2000, and November 24, 2000, respectively.
Lockdown	September 17–21, 2001	Five-part series. Toonami's second Total Immersion Event. One episode aired each day.
Trapped in Hyperspace	September 16–20, 2002	Five-part series. Toonami's third Total Immersion Event. One episode aired each day.
Immortal Grand Prix	September 15–19, 2003	Five-part series. Toonami's fourth Total Immersion Event, and currently the only one not to feature TOM or SARA. The microseries was retooled into IGPX: Immortal Grand Prix, a 26-episode half-hour series. One episode aired each day.
Star Wars: Clone Wars	December 1, 2003 – March 25, 2005	Ran for three seasons. Seasons one and two consisted of ten 3-4 minute parts, while season three consisted of five 11-12 minute parts.
Lego Indiana Jones and the Raiders of the Lost Brick	May 10, 2008	Aired during commercial breaks.
Zurtrun	August 30, 2014	Seven episode microseries. Aired throughout Toonami's Attack on Titan marathon.
The Intruder II	November 7 – December 19, 2015	Seven-part series. Toonami's fifth Total Immersion Event. One episode aired each week.
The Intruder III	November 5–26, 2016	Four-part series. Toonami's sixth Total Immersion Event. One episode aired each week.
Sand Whale and Me	March 18 – April 15, 2017	Five-part series directed by Mamoru Oshii.
Countdown	November 4–25, 2017, April 7, 2018	Four-part series. Toonami's seventh Total Immersion Event. One episode aired each week. A complete rerun beginning at 11:30 pm on April 7, 2018, along with Scavengers.
The Forge	November 9 – December 14, 2019	Six-part series. Toonami's eighth Total Immersion Event. One episode aired each week.
Cosmo Samurai	February 6–27, 2021	Four-part non-canonical series presented in Japanese with English subtitles. Toonami's ninth Total Immersion Event. One episode aired each week. Produced under commission by Sentai Studios.
Cosmo Samurai II	February 19 – March 12, 2022	Four-part non canonical series presented in Japanese with English subtitles, created in celebration of Toonami's 25th anniversary. Toonami's tenth Total Immersion Event. One episode aired each week. Produced under commission by Sentai Studios.
The Return	March 19–26, 2022	Two-part series. Toonami's ninth canonical Total Immersion Event, and eleventh overall, created in celebration of Toonami's 25th anniversary. One episode aired each week.

=== Specials ===
Title	Studio	Most Recent Licensee	Master Licensee	Airdate	Notes
Attack on Titan: The Final Chapters Part 1	MAPPA	Crunchyroll	Crunchyroll	September 9, 2023	
Attack on Titan: The Final Chapters Part 2	MAPPA	Crunchyroll	Crunchyroll	January 6, 2024	
Ballmastrz: Rubicon	Williams Street	Williams Street	Williams Street	February 25, 2021	
Blade Runner Black Out 2022	CygamesPictures	Crunchyroll	Alcon Entertainment / Crunchyroll	November 26, 2021	Aired without the block's on-air branding package due to the runtime of Blade Runner 2049.
Blue Submarine No. 6	Gonzo	Discotek Media	Gonzo	November 6, 2000; January 5, 2001	Miniseries. One episode aired on April 1, 2012.
Dream 9 Toriko & One Piece & Dragon Ball Z Super Collaboration Special!!	Toei Animation	Crunchyroll	Toei Animation	March 5, 2023	Only Part 2 aired.
Gundam Wing: Endless Waltz	Sunrise	Bandai Namco Filmworks	Bandai Namco Filmworks	November 10, 2000; August 30, 2002	Miniseries.
Hot Wheels World Race	Artisan Entertainment	Family Home Entertainment	Family Home Entertainment	October 3, 2003	Miniseries.
Kick-Heart	Production I.G	Production I.G	Production I.G	August 31, 2013; November 2, 2013	Short film by Production I.G. Aired as a special event along with Evangelion 2.22 You Can (Not) Advance (Funimation dub). Aired again November 3, 2013, as a Daylight Saving Time interstitial program.
King Star King	Williams Street	Williams Street	Williams Street	November 2, 2013	Pilot for an upcoming Adult Swim series by the same name. Aired as Daylight Saving Time interstitial program.
Korgoth of Barbaria	Williams Street	Williams Street	Williams Street	November 2, 2013	A failed Adult Swim pilot. Aired as Daylight Saving Time interstitial program.
Naruto – Mission: Protect the Waterfall Village!	Pierrot	Viz Media	Shogakukan-Shueisha	May 19, 2007	
Pokémon Mystery Dungeon: Team Go-Getters Out Of The Gate!	OLM	The Pokémon Company International	The Pokémon Company International	September 9, 2006	Premiered on Fridays the preceding day. Also aired on Miguzi.

=== Animated movies ===
Title	Studio	Most Recent Licensee	Master Licensee	Airdate	Notes
Akira	TMS Entertainment	Crunchyroll	Kodansha	December 7, 2013	1988 anime film based on the manga series of the same name. Rated R by the MPAA in 2001 for brief nudity and graphic violence. Third movie to air on Adult Swim's Toonami. Edited for content. Animaze/Pioneer Entertainment English dub which was first released in select theaters in 2001.
The Animatrix	Village Roadshow Pictures / Silver Pictures / Square Pictures / Studio 4°C, Madhouse / DNA Productions	Warner Bros. Home Entertainment	Warner Bros. Home Entertainment	December 18, 2021	Edited for content. Previously aired on Adult Swim.
Batman & Mr. Freeze: SubZero	Warner Bros. Animation	Warner Bros. Family Entertainment	Warner Bros. Home Entertainment	January 15, 1999; April 8, 2000; December 8, 2000; October 26, 2001	
Batman Beyond: Return of the Joker	Warner Bros. Animation / TMS Entertainment	Warner Bros. Family Entertainment	Warner Bros. Home Entertainment	August 9, 2002; March 19, 2004; July 26, 2008	Re-edited version.
Batman: Gotham Knight	Warner Bros. Animation / Studio 4 °C / Production I.G. / Bee Train / Madhouse	Warner Premiere	Warner Bros. Home Entertainment	August 22, 2020	Previously aired on Cartoon Network.
Batman: Hush	Warner Bros. Animation / DC Entertainment	Warner Bros. Animation	Warner Bros. Home Entertainment	September 17, 2022	
Batman: Mask of the Phantasm	Warner Bros. Animation / Dong Yang Animation / Spectrum Animation	Warner Bros. Family Entertainment	Warner Bros. Home Entertainment	January 8, 1999; December 1, 2000; September 17, 2022	Edited for content.
Batman: Mystery of the Batwoman	Warner Bros. Animation / DR Movie	Warner Bros. Family Entertainment	Warner Bros. Home Entertainment	May 1, 2004	
Batman Ninja	Kamikaze Douga / DC Entertainment	Warner Bros. Pictures	Warner Bros. Pictures / Warner Bros. Japan	October 16, 2021	
Batman: The Dark Knight Returns Part 1	Warner Bros. Animation / DC Entertainment / MOI Animation	Warner Premiere	Warner Bros. Home Entertainment	August 15, 2020	
Batman: The Dark Knight Returns Part 2	Warner Bros. Animation / DC Entertainment / MOI Animation	Warner Premiere	Warner Bros. Home Entertainment	August 22, 2020	
Batman: The Long Halloween Part 1	Warner Bros. Animation / DC Entertainment	Warner Bros. Animation	Warner Bros. Home Entertainment	October 23, 2020	
Batman: The Long Halloween Part 2	Warner Bros. Animation / DC Entertainment	Warner Bros. Animation	Warner Bros. Home Entertainment	October 23, 2020	
Batman: Under the Red Hood	Warner Bros. Animation / DC Entertainment	Warner Premiere	Warner Bros. Home Entertainment	October 16, 2021	Edited for content.
The Batman vs. Dracula	Warner Bros. Animation	Warner Bros. Family Entertainment	Warner Bros. Home Entertainment	October 22, 2005	
Batman: Year One	Warner Bros. Animation / DC Entertainment	Warner Premiere	Warner Bros. Home Entertainment	August 15, 2020	
Ben 10: Secret of the Omnitrix	Cartoon Network Studios	Warner Bros. Home Entertainment	Cartoon Network Studios	August 11, 2007	
Bionicle: Mask of Light	Creative Capers Entertainment	Walt Disney Studios Home Entertainment	Walt Disney Studios Home Entertainment	April 17, 2004	
Bionicle 2: Legends of Metru Nui	Creative Capers Entertainment	Walt Disney Studios Home Entertainment	Walt Disney Studios Home Entertainment	December 18, 2004	
Castle in the Sky	Studio Ghibli	GKIDS	Studio Ghibli	April 1, 2006	Aired as part of A Month of Miyazaki.
Children Who Chase Lost Voices	CoMix Wave Films	Sentai Filmworks	CoMix Wave Films	November 5, 2016	Aired as a daylight saving time filler.
Dragon Ball Z: Bardock – The Father of Goku	Toei Animation	Crunchyroll	Toei Animation	September 5, 2003	Edited for content.
Dragon Ball Z: Broly - The Legendary Super Saiyan	Toei Animation	Crunchyroll	Toei Animation	December 21, 2014	Tenth movie to air on Adult Swim's Toonami. Promoted as Dragon Ball Z: The Legend of Broly.
Dragon Ball Z: Cooler's Revenge	Toei Animation	Crunchyroll	Toei Animation	September 19, 2003; January 30, 2004; May 24, 2014	Original airing edited for content. Re-aired on Adult Swim on May 24, 2014.
Dragon Ball Z: Dead Zone	Toei Animation	Crunchyroll	Toei Animation	February 12, 1999; February 21, 2000	Edited for content.
Dragon Ball Z: Fusion Reborn	Toei Animation	Crunchyroll	Toei Animation	November 11, 2006	
Dragon Ball Z: Lord Slug	Toei Animation	Crunchyroll	Toei Animation	April 24, 2004	Edited for content.
Dragon Ball Z: The Return of Cooler	Toei Animation	Crunchyroll	Toei Animation	September 26, 2003	Edited for content.
Dragon Ball Z: The History of Trunks	Toei Animation	Crunchyroll	Toei Animation	September 12, 2003	Edited for content.
Dragon Ball Z: The Tree of Might	Toei Animation	Crunchyroll	Toei Animation	January 29, 1999; February 21, 2000; November 23, 2001	Edited for content.
Dragon Ball Z: The World's Strongest	Toei Animation	Crunchyroll	Toei Animation	February 5, 1999; November 24, 2000	Edited for content.
Dragon Ball Z: Wrath of the Dragon	Toei Animation	Crunchyroll	Toei Animation	December 2, 2006	
Evangelion 1.11 You Are (Not) Alone	Studio Khara	Crunchyroll	Nippon TV / King Records	March 17, 2013	First film to broadcast on Adult Swim's Toonami. Edited for content. Crunchyroll dub.
Evangelion 2.22 You Can (Not) Advance	Studio Khara	Crunchyroll	Nippon TV / King Records	August 31, 2013	Sequel to Evangelion 1.11: You Are (Not) Alone. Edited for content. Crunchyroll dub. Second movie to air on Adult Swim's Toonami.
Fullmetal Alchemist the Movie: Conqueror of Shamballa	Bones	Crunchyroll / Aniplex of America	Aniplex	December 21, 2013	Fifth film to air on Adult Swim's Toonami.
Fullmetal Alchemist: The Sacred Star of Milos	Bones	Crunchyroll / Aniplex of America	Aniplex	December 14, 2014	Ninth movie to air on Adult Swim's Toonami.
G.I. Joe: Spy Troops	Reel FX Creative Studios / Hasbro Entertainment	Paramount Home Entertainment	Paramount Home Entertainment	January 9, 2004	
G.I. Joe: Valor vs. Venom	Reel FX Creative Studios / Hasbro Entertainment	Paramount Home Entertainment	Paramount Home Entertainment	November 27, 2004	
Gundam Wing: Endless Waltz	Sunrise	Bandai Namco Filmworks	Bandai Namco Filmworks	November 10, 2000; August 30, 2002	Edited for content. First aired on YTV in Canada on September 11, 2001
Hellboy: Blood and Iron	Starz Media / Film Roman / Revolution Studios / Madhouse	Anchor Bay Entertainment	Lionsgate Home Entertainment	March 17, 2007	Aired as part of Toonami's 10th anniversary celebration.
Hellboy: Sword of Storms	Starz Media / Film Roman / Revolution Studios / Madhouse	Anchor Bay Entertainment	Lionsgate Home Entertainment	October 28, 2006	
Hot Wheels: Acceleracers – Breaking Point	Mattel Entertainment / Mainframe Entertainment	Warner Bros. Home Entertainment	Warner Bros. Home Entertainment	June 25, 2005	
Hot Wheels: Acceleracers – Ignition	Mattel Entertainment / Mainframe Entertainment	Warner Bros. Home Entertainment	Warner Bros. Home Entertainment	January 8, 2005	
Hot Wheels: Acceleracers – The Speed of Silence	Mattel Entertainment / Mainframe Entertainment	Warner Bros. Home Entertainment	Warner Bros. Home Entertainment	March 19, 2005	
Hot Wheels: Acceleracers – The Ultimate Race	Mattel Entertainment / Mainframe Entertainment	Warner Bros. Home Entertainment	Warner Bros. Home Entertainment	October 1, 2005	
Injustice	Warner Bros. Animation / DC Entertainment	Warner Bros. Animation	Warner Bros. Home Entertainment	February 18, 2023	Edited for content.
The Invincible Iron Man	MLG Productions	Lionsgate	Lionsgate	March 3, 2007	Aired as part of Toonami's 10th Anniversary celebration.
The Iron Giant	Warner Bros. Animation	Warner Bros. Family Entertainment	Warner Bros. Pictures	September 20, 2002	Part of Trapped in Hyperspace. On the last day of Giant Robot Week, Cartoon Network re-aired the film along with a robot themed episode of Dexter's Laboratory.
Jonny Quest vs. The Cyber Insects	Hanna-Barbera Cartoons / Fil-Cartoons	Turner Home Entertainment	Warner Bros. Home Entertainment	January 22, 1999	
Justice League: The New Frontier	Warner Bros. Animation	Warner Premiere	Warner Bros. Home Entertainment	December 19, 2020	Previously aired on Cartoon Network.
Justice League vs. the Fatal Five	Warner Bros. Animation / DC Entertainment	Warner Bros. Animation	Warner Bros. Home Entertainment	February 25, 2023	Edited for content.
Mind Game	Studio 4 °C	GKIDS	Studio 4 °C	April 1, 2018	Presented in Japanese with English subtitles.
Naruto the Movie: Ninja Clash in the Land of Snow	Pierrot	Viz Media	Shogakukan-Shueisha	September 8, 2007	Also aired on Toonami Jetstream July 29, 2008.
Naruto the Movie 2: Legend of the Stone of Gelel	Pierrot	Viz Media	Shogakukan-Shueisha	July 26, 2008	Aired as part of a Toonami special, when Toonami aired from 5:30 p.m. to 11:00 p.m.. Also aired on Toonami Jetstream.
Nausicaä of the Valley of the Wind	Studio Ghibli	GKIDS	Studio Ghibli	April 8, 2006	Aired as part of A Month of Miyazaki.
Pokémon: The First Movie	OLM	The Pokémon Company International	The Pokémon Company International	March 26, 2004	First aired in the United States on HBO Family
Pokémon: The Movie 2000	OLM	The Pokémon Company International	The Pokémon Company International	April 2, 2004	First aired in the United States on HBO Family
Pokémon 3: The Movie	OLM	The Pokémon Company International	The Pokémon Company International	April 16, 2004	Aired on the final day of the weekday Toonami.
The Powerpuff Girls Movie	Cartoon Network Studios	Warner Bros. Pictures	Warner Bros. Pictures	March 5, 2004	
Princess Mononoke	Studio Ghibli	GKIDS	Studio Ghibli	March 25, 2006	Aired as part of A Month of Miyazaki. Aired with parental advisory.
Sailor Moon R: The Movie	Toei Animation	Viz Media	Kodansha	November 2, 2001	Edited version.
Sailor Moon S: The Movie	Toei Animation	Viz Media	Kodansha	November 9, 2001	Edited version.
Sailor Moon Super S: The Movie	Toei Animation	Viz Media	Kodansha	November 16, 2001; September 13, 2002	Edited version.
Spirited Away	Studio Ghibli	GKIDS	Studio Ghibli	March 18, 2006	Aired as part of A Month of Miyazaki.
Stan Lee Presents: Mosaic	POW! Entertainment / Film Roman / Manga Entertainment	Lionsgate	Lionsgate	March 10, 2007	Advertised as TV-Y7-FV, aired as TV-14-V.
Stan Lee Presents: The Condor	POW! Entertainment / Film Roman / Manga Entertainment	Lionsgate	Lionsgate	March 24, 2007	
Summer Wars	Madhouse	Crunchyroll	Nippon TV / Warner Bros. Pictures / Warner Bros. Japan	December 14, 2013	Fourth movie to air on Adult Swim's Toonami.
Superman: Brainiac Attacks	Warner Bros. Animation	Warner Bros. Family Entertainment	Warner Bros. Home Entertainment	June 17, 2006	
Superman: Doomsday	Warner Bros. Animation	Warner Premiere	Warner Bros. Home Entertainment	July 12, 2008	Heavily edited.
Teen Titans: Trouble in Tokyo	Warner Bros. Animation	Warner Bros. Animation	Warner Bros. Family Entertainment	September 16, 2006	
Trigun: Badlands Rumble	Madhouse	Crunchyroll	FlyingDog	December 28, 2013	Sixth movie to air on Adult Swim's Toonami.
Ultimate Avengers	MLG Productions / Dong Woo Animation	Lionsgate	Lionsgate	April 22, 2006	
Ultimate Avengers 2: Rise of the Panther	MLG Productions / Dong Woo Animation	Lionsgate	Lionsgate	October 21, 2006	
Wonder Woman: Bloodlines	Warner Bros. Animation / DC Entertainment	Warner Bros. Animation	Warner Bros. Home Entertainment	December 19, 2020	
World's Finest	Warner Bros. Animation	Warner Bros. Animation	Warner Bros. Animation	November 17, 2000; November 30, 2001; September 6, 2002	
Yu-Gi-Oh! The Movie: Pyramid of Light	Gallop	Konami Cross Media NY	Konami Cross Media NY	July 30, 2005	Edited version.

=== Live-action movies ===
Title	Airdate	Notes
Batman	November 19, 2005	
Blade Runner 2049	November 26, 2021	Edited for content. Aired without the block's on-air branding package due to the runtime of the film.
Ginger Root's Shinbangumi: A Music Movie	April 26, 2025	
Spider-Man	April 28, 2007	Edited for content.

=== Giant Robot Week ===
From February 24–28, 2003, Toonami broadcast mecha shows that were licensed by ADV Films, some of which were picked up by Adult Swim. Besides Robotech, the following shows were featured:

Title	Airdate	Notes
Dai-Guard	February 27–28, 2003	Episodes 1 and 2 aired on Toonami. Has not aired since GRW.
Gigantor	February 24–28, 2003; April 1, 2012	Gigantor was picked up by Adult Swim.
Martian Successor Nadesico	February 24–26, 2003	Episodes 1, 6, and 25 aired on Toonami. Has not aired since GRW.
Neon Genesis Evangelion	February 24–25, 2003	Heavily edited version of episodes 1 and 2 aired on Toonami with parental advisory during this week only. Neon Genesis Evangelion was aired as a whole on Adult Swim.

=== Adult Swim April Fools' Day 2012 ===
These shows have only aired during the Toonami April Fools' Day broadcast on Adult Swim, April 1, 2012.

Title	Airdate	Notes
Astro Boy (1960s)	April 1, 2012	Originally aired on Adult Swim. Not to be confused with the 2003 version.
Trigun	April 1, 2012	Originally aired on Adult Swim.

== Programs featured by block ==
A list of the lineups and programs featured in Toonami blocks. The schedule occasionally features "Toonami In Flight" blocks which contain movies or special presentations, as well as marathons and other scheduled programming that would occupy some of Cartoon Network and Adult Swim's regular programming.

=== Weekday Toonami on Cartoon Network ===
==== Weekday Toonami (1997–2004) ====
===== Moltar's block (1997–'99) =====
Moltar from Space Ghost Coast to Coast was the original host of Toonami, which ran on Cartoon Network from 4–6 pm weekdays from March 17, 1997 to July 9, 1999. Programs included:

- Beast Wars: Transformers
- Cartoon Roulette
- Dragon Ball Z
- The Real Adventures of Jonny Quest
- ReBoot
- Robotech
- Sailor Moon
- Super Friends
- ThunderCats
- Voltron

===== TOM's blocks (1999–2004) =====
TOM took over Toonami's hosting duties starting July 11, 1999. Toonami went from a 4–6 pm schedule to a 4–7 pm schedule starting July 3, 2000. On September 1, 2000, the "DBZ: Garlic Jr. Saga Mini-Marathon" aired, preempting Sailor Moon and Gundam Wing for a day. It included the following programs:

- Batman: The Animated Series
- Dragon Ball Z
- Gundam Wing
- The Real Adventures of Jonny Quest
- ReBoot
- Ronin Warriors
- Sailor Moon
- Tenchi in Tokyo
- Tenchi Muyo!
- Tenchi Universe
- ThunderCats

TOM was given a new look and introduction on September 22, 2000. On November 17, the film World's Finest aired from 5:00 to 6:30 pm. The regularly scheduled Dragon Ball Z, Tenchi Universe, Gundam Wing were preempted for the day and Superman: The Animated Series aired at 6:30 pm. On May 14, 2001, the schedule was changed to 5–7 pm. On June 3, 2002, the schedule went back to 4–7 pm. On March 3, 2003, the schedule went back to 5–7 pm. The programs under TOM 2.0's run include:

- Batman: The Animated Series
- Batman Beyond
- The Big O
- Blue Submarine No. 6
- Cardcaptors
- Dragon Ball
- Dragon Ball Z
- G-Gundam
- Gundam Wing
- Hamtaro
- He-Man and the Masters of the Universe
- Mobile Suit Gundam
- Mobile Suit Gundam: The 08th MS Team
- Outlaw Star
- The Powerpuff Girls
- ReBoot
- Ronin Warriors
- Sailor Moon
- Superman: The Animated Series
- Tenchi in Tokyo
- Tenchi Muyo!
- Tenchi Universe
- ThunderCats
- Transformers: Armada
- YuYu Hakusho
- Zoids: New Century Zero
- Zoids: Chaotic Century

TOM had one more makeover on March 17, 2003. This third iteration of TOM included the following programs:

- Astro Boy
- Cyborg 009
- Dragon Ball
- Dragon Ball GT
- Dragon Ball Z
- G-Gundam
- He-Man and the Masters of the Universe
- Justice League
- Rurouni Kenshin
- Samurai Jack
- SD Gundam Force
- Transformers: Armada
- YuYu Hakusho

==== Midnight Run (2000–'03) ====
Midnight runs were moved to Weeknights at midnight, starting with Monday night/Tuesday morning to Friday night/Saturday morning. Toonami Midnight Run ran from March 7, 2000 to January 9, 2003 from 12–1 am and included:

- The Big O (until May 24, 2001)
- Dragon Ball (until October 30, 2002)
- Dragon Ball Z (until October 30, 2002)
- Dragon Ball Z: Dead Zone (October 31, 2001)
- G Gundam
- G.I. Joe: A Real American Hero (1985)
- Gundam 0080
- Gundam Wing (Uncut)
- Mobile Suit Gundam: The 08th MS Team
- Outlaw Star
- Tenchi Muyo!
- Tenchi Universe
- Tenchi In Tokyo

=== Weekend Toonami on Cartoon Network ===
==== Saturday Toonami (1997–'99) ====
Saturday Toonami ran from July 19, 1997 to July 4, 1998 at 7–9 pm, and from July 11, 1998 to October 3, 1998 at 1–3 pm and included the following programs:

- Cartoon Roulette
- The Real Adventures of Jonny Quest
- Robotech
- ThunderCats
- Sailor Moon
- Voltron

==== Midnight Run (1999–2000) ====
Toonami's Midnight Run programming block started on Sunday at midnight and ran from 12–5 am. It ran from July 11, 1999 to March 5, 2000, after which it was moved to a weeknight Midnight Run. It included the following programs:

- Cartoon Roulette
- Dragon Ball Z
- Dragon Ball Z: Dead Zone (October 30, 1999)
- G-Force: Guardians of Space
- The Powerpuff Girls
- The Real Adventures of Jonny Quest
- ReBoot
- Robotech
- Ronin Warriors
- Sailor Moon
- ThunderCats
- Voltron

==== Rising Sun (2000–'01) ====
Toonami's Rising Sun programming block ran on Saturday mornings from April 15, 2000 to March 3, 2001 from 9 am – 12 pm from April 15 – September 2, 10 am – 1 pm from September 9 – December 9, 2000, and 11 am – 1 pm from December 16, 2000 – March 3, 2001.

List of programs broadcast on Toonami's Rising Sun block
Broadcast dates	Programs featured	Special programming
April 15, 2000– May 6, 2000	ThunderCats (2 ep.), Dragon Ball Z, Gundam Wing (2 ep.), Ronin Warriors	
May 13, 2000– July 1, 2000	ThunderCats (2 ep.), Gundam Wing, Dragon Ball Z, Batman: The Animated Series, The Powerpuff Girls	May 27 - Dragon Ball Z hour-long Garlic Jr. Saga finale, The Powerpuff Girls preempted.; June 3 - Not shown because of June Bugs marathon
July 8, 2000– October 7, 2000	ThunderCats (2 ep.), Sailor Moon, Tenchi Muyo!, Dragon Ball Z, The Powerpuff Girls	August 26 - Not shown because of Cartoon Cartoon Weekend
October 14, 2000– December 9, 2000	ThunderCats (2 ep.), Sailor Moon, Tenchi Universe, Dragon Ball Z, The Powerpuff Girls	October 28 - Not shown because of Scooby-Doo movie marathon; December 9 - Not shown because of JBVO Weekend marathon with the exception of ThunderCats at 11 am and Tenchi Universe at 11:30 am
December 16, 2000– March 3, 2001	ThunderCats, Tenchi Universe, Dragon Ball Z, Sailor Moon	

==== Super Saturday (2001–'03) ====
Toonami's Saturday afternoon programming block ran from October 20, 2001, to February 22, 2003, from 1–3 pm, later changing to 1–4 pm in June 2002. It included the following programs:

- Dragon Ball
- Dragon Ball Z
- G-Gundam
- .hack//SIGN
- He-Man and the Masters of the Universe (2002)
- Samurai Jack
- Transformers: Armada
- Zoids: Chaotic Century

==== Toonami Saturday Night (2004–'08) ====
On April 17, 2004, Toonami was moved to Saturday nights 7–11 PM with TOM's 3rd stint as the host. Miguzi would take over the former Toonami weekday space. On October 13, 2007, the schedule was reduced to 9–11 PM. Programs broadcast include the following:

- Astro Boy (2003)
- The Batman
- Ben 10: Alien Force
- Blue Dragon
- Bobobo-bo Bo-bobo
- D.I.C.E.
- Dragon Ball GT
- Dragon Ball Z
- Duel Masters
- Fantastic Four: World's Greatest Heroes
- Gundam SEED
- IGPX
- Jackie Chan Adventures
- Justice League Unlimited
- MÄR: Märchen Awakens Romance
- Megas XLR
- Naruto
- One Piece
- Pokémon: Battle Frontier
- Pokémon Chronicles
- The Prince of Tennis
- Rave Master
- Rurouni Kenshin
- Samurai Jack
- Star Wars: Clone Wars
- Storm Hawks
- Teen Titans
- Transformers: Cybertron
- Wulin Warriors
- Yu-Gi-Oh!
- Yu-Gi-Oh! GX
- YuYu Hakusho
- Zatch Bell!

=== Toonami lineups on Adult Swim ===
==== 2012–2019 ====
Following a sneak preview on the night of March 31, 2012, Adult Swim began broadcasting Toonami on May 26, 2012 from 12 – 6 am.

List of programs broadcast on Adult Swim's Toonami block (2012–2019)
Broadcast dates (Note: All broadcast dates shown are Saturday, per all promotional material by Adult Swim. In the Eastern Time Zone, the block has either started sometime before or directly at midnight, which is effectively Sunday on a calendar day.)	Time	Programs featured	Special programming	Notes and refs
March 31, 2012	12 – 6 am	Bleach, Dragon Ball Z, Gundam Wing, Tenchi Muyo!, Outlaw Star, The Big O, YuYu Hakusho, Blue Submarine No. 6, Trigun, Astro Boy (1963), Gigantor		April Fools 2012 edition
May 26, 2012– July 28, 2012	12 – 6 am	Bleach, Deadman Wonderland, Casshern Sins, Fullmetal Alchemist: Brotherhood, Ghost in the Shell: S.A.C. 2nd GIG, Cowboy Bebop		Block repeats at 3–6 am
August 4, 2012– August 11, 2012	12 – 6 am	Bleach, Deadman Wonderland, Casshern Sins, Fullmetal Alchemist: Brotherhood, Ghost in the Shell: Stand Alone Complex, Cowboy Bebop		Block repeats at 3–6 am
August 18, 2012– September 29, 2012	12 – 6 am	Bleach, Samurai 7, Casshern Sins, Eureka Seven, Fullmetal Alchemist: Brotherhood, Ghost in the Shell: Stand Alone Complex		Block repeats at 3–6 am
October 6, 2012– November 3, 2012	12 – 6 am	Bleach, Samurai 7, Casshern Sins, Eureka Seven, Sym-Bionic Titan, ThunderCats (2011), Fullmetal Alchemist: Brotherhood (2 ep), Ghost in the Shell: Stand Alone Complex (2 ep), Cowboy Bebop (2 ep)	November 3: InuYasha added during daylight saving time extra hour.	Programming expanded to 6-hour block (Note: InuYasha was added on November 4, 2012, during the extra hour introduced by daylight saving time.)
November 10, 2012– November 24, 2012	12 – 6 am	Bleach, Tenchi Muyo! GXP, Samurai 7, ThunderCats (2011), Sym-Bionic Titan, Eureka Seven, Fullmetal Alchemist: Brotherhood (2 ep), Cowboy Bebop (2 ep), InuYasha (2 ep)		
December 1, 2012– December 8, 2012	12 – 6 am	Bleach, Naruto, Tenchi Muyo! GXP, ThunderCats, Samurai 7, Sym-Bionic Titan, Eureka Seven, Fullmetal Alchemist: Brotherhood, Cowboy Bebop (2 ep), InuYasha (2 ep)		Naruto returns in uncut format.
December 15, 2012– February 9, 2013	12 – 6 am	Bleach, Naruto, ThunderCats, Samurai 7, Sym-Bionic Titan, Eureka Seven, Tenchi Muyo! GXP, Fullmetal Alchemist: Brotherhood, Cowboy Bebop (2 ep), InuYasha (2 ep)		
February 16, 2013– April 20, 2013	12 – 6 am	Bleach, Naruto, Soul Eater, ThunderCats, Sym-Bionic Titan, Eureka Seven, Tenchi Muyo! GXP, Fullmetal Alchemist: Brotherhood, Cowboy Bebop (2 ep), InuYasha (2 ep)	March 10: Sym-Bionic Titan and Eureka Seven preempted during daylight saving time.; March 17: Evangelion 1.11 You Are (Not) Alone (Funimation dub)	
April 27, 2013– May 11, 2013	12 – 6 am	Bleach, Naruto, Soul Eater, ThunderCats, IGPX, Eureka Seven, Tenchi Muyo! GXP, Sym-Bionic Titan, Fullmetal Alchemist: Brotherhood, Cowboy Bebop, InuYasha (2 ep)		
May 18, 2013– July 20, 2013	12 – 6 am	Bleach, Naruto, One Piece, Soul Eater, IGPX, Eureka Seven, ThunderCats, Sym-Bionic Titan, Fullmetal Alchemist: Brotherhood, Cowboy Bebop, InuYasha (2 ep)		
July 27, 2013– August 10, 2013	12 – 6 am	Bleach, Naruto, One Piece, Soul Eater, Sword Art Online, IGPX, Eureka Seven, The Big O (season 2), Fullmetal Alchemist: Brotherhood, Cowboy Bebop, InuYasha (2 ep)		(Note: Due to the expiration of its airing rights, ThunderCats was removed from the lineup and was replaced with Sword Art Online starting July 27, 2013. Sym-Bionic Titan was removed from the lineup, and replaced by The Big O.)
August 17, 2013– October 19, 2013	12 – 6 am	Bleach, Naruto, One Piece, Soul Eater, Sword Art Online, IGPX, Star Wars: The Clone Wars, The Big O, Fullmetal Alchemist: Brotherhood, Cowboy Bebop, InuYasha (2 ep)	August 31: Evangelion 2.22 You Can (Not) Advance (Funimation dub), Kick-Heart; October 19: IGPX double episode finale. Star Wars: The Clone Wars preempted.	(Note: Starting August 17, 2013, Eureka Seven was replaced by the 2008 series of Star Wars: The Clone Wars.) (Note: Kick-Heart was a 15-minute episode broadcast on Adult Swim Toonami on August 31, 2013, following the Evangelion movie.) (Note: IGPX presented its finale on October 19, 2013, where it aired two episodes.)
October 26, 2013– December 28, 2013	12 – 6 am	Bleach, Naruto, One Piece, Soul Eater, Sword Art Online, FLCL, Star Wars: The Clone Wars, Fullmetal Alchemist: Brotherhood, Ghost in the Shell: Stand Alone Complex, IGPX, InuYasha (2 ep)	November 2: King Star King, Korgoth of Barbaria and Kick-Heart pilots air during daylight saving time extra hour; In-flight movies: December 7: Akira; December 14: Summer Wars; December 21: Fullmetal Alchemist the Movie: Conqueror of Shamballa; December 28: Trigun: Badlands Rumble and Cowboy Bebop marathon	
January 4, 2014– January 25, 2014	11:30 pm – 6 am	Space Dandy, Bleach, Naruto: Shippuden, One Piece, Soul Eater, Sword Art Online, FLCL, Naruto, Fullmetal Alchemist: Brotherhood, Ghost in the Shell: Stand Alone Complex, IGPX, Star Wars: The Clone Wars, InuYasha		
February 1, 2014– February 15, 2014	11:30 pm – 6 am	Space Dandy, Bleach, Naruto: Shippuden, One Piece, Soul Eater, Sword Art Online, Naruto, Ghost in the Shell: Stand Alone Complex, Fullmetal Alchemist: Brotherhood, Samurai Jack, IGPX, Star Wars: The Clone Wars, InuYasha		
February 22, 2014– March 1, 2014	11:30 pm – 6 am	Space Dandy, Bleach, Naruto: Shippuden, One Piece, Blue Exorcist, Soul Eater, Naruto, Ghost in the Shell: Stand Alone Complex, Fullmetal Alchemist: Brotherhood, Samurai Jack, IGPX, Star Wars: The Clone Wars, InuYasha		
March 8, 2014– March 15, 2014	11:30 pm – 6 am	Space Dandy, Bleach, Naruto: Shippuden, One Piece, Blue Exorcist, Soul Eater, Naruto, Ghost in the Shell: Stand Alone Complex, Fullmetal Alchemist: Brotherhood, Samurai Jack, IGPX, Star Wars: The Clone Wars, Sym-Bionic Titan	March 8: Ghost in the Shell: Stand Alone Complex and Fullmetal Alchemist: Brotherhood preempted during daylight saving time.	
March 22, 2014– April 26, 2014	11:30 pm – 6 am	Space Dandy, Bleach, Naruto: Shippuden, One Piece, Blue Exorcist, Black Lagoon, Naruto, Ghost in the Shell: Stand Alone Complex, Fullmetal Alchemist: Brotherhood, Samurai Jack, IGPX, Star Wars: The Clone Wars, Sym-Bionic Titan		
May 3, 2014	11:30 pm – 6 am	Attack on Titan, Bleach, Space Dandy, Naruto: Shippuden, One Piece, Blue Exorcist, Black Lagoon, Naruto, Ghost in the Shell: Stand Alone Complex, Fullmetal Alchemist: Brotherhood, Samurai Jack, Star Wars: The Clone Wars, Sym-Bionic Titan		
May 10, 2014– July 19, 2014	11:30 pm – 6 am	Attack on Titan, Bleach, Space Dandy, Naruto: Shippuden, One Piece, Blue Exorcist, Black Lagoon, Beware the Batman, Naruto, Fullmetal Alchemist: Brotherhood, Samurai Jack, Star Wars: The Clone Wars, Sym-Bionic Titan	May 24: Dragon Ball Z: Cooler's Revenge; July 5: Extra episodes of Space Dandy for premiere of second season	
July 26, 2014– August 9, 2014	11:30 pm – 6 am	Attack on Titan, Bleach, Space Dandy, Naruto: Shippuden, One Piece, Blue Exorcist, Beware the Batman, Black Lagoon, Naruto, Fullmetal Alchemist: Brotherhood, Cowboy Bebop, Star Wars: The Clone Wars, Samurai Jack		
August 16, 2014– September 6, 2014	11:30 pm – 6 am	Attack on Titan, Bleach, Space Dandy, Naruto: Shippuden, One Piece, Gurren Lagann, Beware the Batman, Black Lagoon, Naruto, Fullmetal Alchemist: Brotherhood, Cowboy Bebop, Star Wars: The Clone Wars, Samurai Jack	August 30: Attack on Titan marathon	
September 13, 2014– September 27, 2014	11:30 pm – 6 am	Attack on Titan, Bleach, Space Dandy, Naruto: Shippuden, One Piece, Gurren Lagann, Beware the Batman, Hellsing Ultimate, Fullmetal Alchemist: Brotherhood, Cowboy Bebop, Star Wars: The Clone Wars, Samurai Jack	September 27: Beware the Batman marathon of remaining episodes due to the series being written off	
October 4, 2014– November 1, 2014	11:30 pm – 6 am	Attack on Titan, Bleach, Naruto: Shippuden, One Piece, Gurren Lagann, Hellsing Ultimate, Space Dandy, Cowboy Bebop, Fullmetal Alchemist: Brotherhood, Ghost in the Shell: S.A.C. 2nd GIG, The Big O, Samurai Jack	November 1: Dragon Ball Z: Cooler's Revenge airs during daylight saving time extra hour	
November 8, 2014	11:30 pm – 6 am	Attack on Titan, Dragon Ball Z Kai, Naruto: Shippuden, One Piece, Gurren Lagann, Hellsing Ultimate, Space Dandy, Cowboy Bebop, Fullmetal Alchemist: Brotherhood, Ghost in the Shell: S.A.C. 2nd GIG, The Big O, Samurai Jack		
November 15, 2014– December 27, 2014	11:30 pm – 6 am	Attack on Titan, Dragon Ball Z Kai, Naruto: Shippuden, One Piece, Gurren Lagann, InuYasha: The Final Act, Bleach, Space Dandy, Cowboy Bebop, Fullmetal Alchemist: Brotherhood, Ghost in the Shell: S.A.C. 2nd GIG, The Big O, Samurai Jack	Featured movies: December 6: Hellsing Ultimate Episode 9 & Summer Wars; December 13: Hellsing Ultimate Episode 10 & Fullmetal Alchemist: The Sacred Star of Milos; December 20: Dragon Ball Z: Broly – The Legendary Super Saiyan & Akira; December 27: Evangelion: 1.11 You Are (Not) Alone & Evangelion: 2.22 You Can (Not) Advance (Both are Funimation dubs)	
January 3, 2015– January 31, 2015	11:30 pm – 6 am (Note: Toonami announced it is dropping a half-hour of programming on January 24, 2015, lineup and an hour of programming on the January 31 lineup)	Attack on Titan, Dragon Ball Z Kai, Naruto: Shippuden, InuYasha: The Final Act, One Piece, Gurren Lagann, Deadman Wonderland, Bleach, Space Dandy, Cowboy Bebop, Ghost in the Shell: S.A.C. 2nd GIG, IGPX, Samurai Jack		Schedule reduction for January 24 and 31.
February 7, 2015– March 21, 2015	12 – 3:30 am	Dragon Ball Z Kai, Kill la Kill, Naruto: Shippuden, InuYasha: The Final Act, Gurren Lagann, One Piece, Deadman Wonderland		
March 28, 2015– June 13, 2015	12 – 3:30 am	Dragon Ball Z Kai, Kill la Kill, Sword Art Online II, InuYasha: The Final Act, Naruto: Shippuden, One Piece, Attack on Titan	May 23: Kill la Kill marathon	
June 20, 2015– August 1, 2015	12 – 3:30 am	Dragon Ball Z Kai, Kill la Kill, Michiko & Hatchin, Sword Art Online II, Naruto: Shippuden, One Piece, Attack on Titan	July 4: Dragon Ball Z Kai marathon	
August 8, 2015– September 26, 2015	12 – 3:30 am	Dragon Ball Z Kai, Akame ga Kill!, Michiko & Hatchin, Sword Art Online II, Naruto: Shippuden, One Piece, Attack on Titan	September 5: Michiko & Hatchin marathon	
October 3, 2015– December 26, 2015	12 – 3:30 am	Dragon Ball Z Kai, Akame ga Kill!, Parasyte -the maxim-, Michiko & Hatchin, Naruto: Shippuden, One Piece, Kill la Kill	October 31: Akame ga Kill marathon; November 7 – December 19: Intruder II event; November 28: Parasyte -the maxim- marathon; December 19: Dragon Ball Z Kai marathon; December 26: One Piece marathon	
January 2, 2016– February 20, 2016	12 – 3:30 am	Dragon Ball Z Kai, Akame ga Kill!, Parasyte -the maxim-, Samurai Champloo, Naruto: Shippuden, One Piece, Kill la Kill		
February 27, 2016– April 9, 2016	12 – 3:30 am	Dragon Ball Z Kai, Dimension W, Parasyte -the maxim-, Samurai Champloo, Naruto: Shippuden, One Piece, Kill la Kill		
April 16, 2016– May 14, 2016	12 – 3:30 am	Dragon Ball Z Kai, Dimension W, Hunter × Hunter (2011), Samurai Champloo, Naruto: Shippuden, One Piece, Parasyte -the maxim-		
May 21, 2016– May 28, 2016	12 – 3:30 am	Dragon Ball Z Kai (2 ep), Hunter × Hunter (2011), Samurai Champloo, Naruto: Shippuden, One Piece, Parasyte -the maxim-	May 28: Samurai Champloo marathon	
June 4, 2016– July 9, 2016	11:30 pm – 3 am	Dragon Ball Z Kai, Mobile Suit Gundam: Iron-Blooded Orphans, Hunter × Hunter (2011), Samurai Champloo, Naruto: Shippuden, One Piece, Parasyte -the maxim-	July 2: Hunter × Hunter marathon	
July 16, 2016– September 24, 2016	11:30 pm – 3 am	Dragon Ball Z Kai, One-Punch Man, Mobile Suit Gundam: Iron-Blooded Orphans, Hunter × Hunter (2011), Naruto: Shippuden, One Piece, Parasyte -the maxim-	September 3: One-Punch Man marathon	
October 1, 2016	12 – 4:30 am	Dragon Ball Z Kai, One-Punch Man, Mobile Suit Gundam: Iron-Blooded Orphans, Hunter × Hunter (2011), Naruto: Shippuden, One Piece, Parasyte -the maxim- (3 ep)	Remaining second run of Parasyte -the maxim- episodes shown due to the broadcast rights expiring.	
October 8, 2016	12 – 3:30 am	Dragon Ball Z Kai, One-Punch Man, Mobile Suit Gundam: Iron-Blooded Orphans, Hunter × Hunter (2011), Naruto: Shippuden, One Piece	One-Punch Man episode 12 repeats at 3:00 am after its 12:30 am premiere.	
October 15, 2016– December 10, 2016	12 – 3:30 am	Dragon Ball Z Kai, JoJo's Bizarre Adventure, Mobile Suit Gundam: Iron-Blooded Orphans, Hunter × Hunter (2011), Naruto: Shippuden, One Piece, One-Punch Man	October 29: Mobile Suit Gundam: Iron-Blooded Orphans marathon; November 5: Children Who Chase Lost Voices; November 5–26: Intruder III event	
December 17, 2016– December 31, 2016	12 – 3:30 am	Dragon Ball Z Kai, JoJo's Bizarre Adventure (2 ep.), Hunter × Hunter (2011), Naruto: Shippuden, One Piece, One-Punch Man	December 24: JoJo's Bizarre Adventure marathon; December 31: Dragon Ball Z Kai marathon	
January 7, 2017– January 28, 2017	11:30 pm – 3:30 am	Dragon Ball Super, Dragon Ball Z Kai: The Final Chapters, JoJo's Bizarre Adventure, Mobile Suit Gundam Unicorn RE:0096, Hunter × Hunter (2011), Naruto: Shippuden, One Piece, One-Punch Man	Dragon Ball Super premiere at 8:00 pm, with encore at 11:30 pm	
February 4, 2017– March 4, 2017	11:30 pm – 3:30 am	Dragon Ball Super, Dragon Ball Z Kai: The Final Chapters, JoJo's Bizarre Adventure, Mobile Suit Gundam Unicorn RE:0096, Hunter × Hunter (2011), Naruto: Shippuden, One Piece, Ghost in the Shell: Stand Alone Complex		
March 11, 2017– March 18, 2017	11 pm – 3:30 am	Samurai Jack, Dragon Ball Super, Dragon Ball Z Kai: The Final Chapters, JoJo's Bizarre Adventure, Mobile Suit Gundam Unicorn RE:0096, Hunter × Hunter (2011), Naruto: Shippuden, One Piece, Ghost in the Shell: Stand Alone Complex		
March 25, 2017– April 8, 2017	11 pm – 3:30 am	Samurai Jack, Dragon Ball Super, Dragon Ball Z Kai: The Final Chapters, JoJo's Bizarre Adventure, Tokyo Ghoul, Hunter × Hunter (2011), Mobile Suit Gundam Unicorn RE:0096, Naruto: Shippuden, Ghost in the Shell: Stand Alone Complex	April 1: Schedule reduced for one week only.	
April 15, 2017	11 pm – 3:30 am	Samurai Jack, Dragon Ball Super, Dragon Ball Z Kai: The Final Chapters, JoJo's Bizarre Adventure (2 ep.), Hunter × Hunter (2011), Mobile Suit Gundam Unicorn RE:0096, Naruto: Shippuden, Ghost in the Shell: Stand Alone Complex		
April 22, 2017– June 10, 2017	11 pm – 3:30 am	Samurai Jack, Dragon Ball Super, Dragon Ball Z Kai: The Final Chapters, Attack on Titan, Tokyo Ghoul, Hunter × Hunter (2011), Mobile Suit Gundam Unicorn RE:0096, Naruto: Shippuden, Ghost in the Shell: Stand Alone Complex	May 27: Samurai Jack marathon (11 pm – 4 am)	
June 17, 2017– July 1, 2017	11 pm - 3:30 am	Samurai Jack, Dragon Ball Super, Dragon Ball Z Kai: The Final Chapters, Attack on Titan, Tokyo Ghoul, Hunter x Hunter (2011), Lupin the 3rd Part IV: The Italian Adventure, Naruto: Shippuden, Ghost in the Shell: Stand Alone Complex	July 1: Attack on Titan marathon	
July 8, 2017– July 22, 2017	11:30 pm – 3:30 am	Dragon Ball Super, Dragon Ball Z Kai: The Final Chapters, Attack on Titan, Tokyo Ghoul √A, Hunter x Hunter (2011), Lupin the Third Part IV, Naruto: Shippuden, Ghost in the Shell: Stand Alone Complex		
July 29, 2017– August 12, 2017	11 pm – 3:30 am	Dragon Ball Super, Dragon Ball Z Kai: The Final Chapters, JoJo's Bizarre Adventure: Stardust Crusaders, Tokyo Ghoul √A, Hunter × Hunter (2011), Lupin the Third Part IV, Naruto: Shippuden, Ghost in the Shell: Stand Alone Complex, Attack on Titan		
August 19, 2017– September 2, 2017	11 pm – 3:30 am	Dragon Ball Super, Dragon Ball Z Kai: The Final Chapters, JoJo's Bizarre Adventure: Stardust Crusaders, Tokyo Ghoul √A, Hunter × Hunter (2011), Lupin the Third Part IV, Naruto: Shippuden, Outlaw Star, Attack on Titan	September 2: Dragon Ball Z Kai: The Final Chapters marathon	
September 9, 2017– September 30, 2017	11 pm – 4 am	Dragon Ball Super, Dragon Ball Z Kai: The Final Chapters, JoJo's Bizarre Adventure: Stardust Crusaders, Tokyo Ghoul √A, Hunter × Hunter (2011), Lupin the Third Part IV, Naruto: Shippuden, Outlaw Star, Cowboy Bebop, Attack on Titan		
October 7, 2017– October 14, 2017	11 pm – 4 am	Dragon Ball Super, Dragon Ball Z Kai: The Final Chapters, JoJo's Bizarre Adventure: Stardust Crusaders, Mobile Suit Gundam: Iron-Blooded Orphans, Hunter × Hunter (2011), Lupin the Third Part IV, Naruto: Shippuden, Outlaw Star, Cowboy Bebop, Attack on Titan		
October 21, 2017– November 25, 2017	11 pm – 4 am	Dragon Ball Super, Dragon Ball Z Kai: The Final Chapters, JoJo's Bizarre Adventure: Stardust Crusaders, Mobile Suit Gundam: Iron-Blooded Orphans, Hunter × Hunter (2011), Lupin the Third Part IV, Naruto: Shippuden, Outlaw Star, Cowboy Bebop, Ghost in the Shell: S.A.C. 2nd GIG	October 28: Samurai Jack marathon; November 4–25: Countdown event; November 25: Dragon Ball Z Kai: The Final Chapters marathon	
December 2, 2017– January 20, 2018	10:30 pm – 4 am	Dragon Ball Super, Dragon Ball Z Kai: The Final Chapters, Black Clover, JoJo's Bizarre Adventure: Stardust Crusaders, Mobile Suit Gundam: Iron-Blooded Orphans, Hunter × Hunter (2011), Lupin the Third Part IV, Naruto: Shippuden, Outlaw Star, Cowboy Bebop, Ghost in the Shell: S.A.C. 2nd GIG	December 23: Cowboy Bebop marathon; December 30: Dragon Ball Super marathon	
January 27, 2018– March 17, 2018	10:30 pm – 4 am	Dragon Ball Super, Dragon Ball Z Kai: The Final Chapters, Black Clover, JoJo's Bizarre Adventure: Stardust Crusaders, Mobile Suit Gundam: Iron-Blooded Orphans, Hunter × Hunter (2011), Naruto: Shippuden, Outlaw Star, Space Dandy, Cowboy Bebop, Ghost in the Shell: S.A.C. 2nd GIG		
March 24, 2018– April 7, 2018	10:30 pm – 4 am	Dragon Ball Super, Dragon Ball Z Kai: The Final Chapters, Black Clover, JoJo's Bizarre Adventure: Stardust Crusaders, Mobile Suit Gundam: Iron-Blooded Orphans, Hunter × Hunter (2011), Naruto: Shippuden, Space Dandy, Cowboy Bebop (2 ep.), Ghost in the Shell: S.A.C. 2nd GIG	March 31: April Fools English subtitled block featuring FLCL Alternative & Mind Game (12 am – 2:45 am) with the remaining regular schedule aired subbed with the exception of Dragon Ball Super, Dragon Ball Z Kai: The Final Chapters, Black Clover, and Mobile Suit Gundam: Iron-Blooded Orphans.	
April 14, 2018– April 28, 2018	10:30 pm – 4 am	Dragon Ball Super, Dragon Ball Z Kai: The Final Chapters, FLCL, JoJo's Bizarre Adventure: Stardust Crusaders, Mobile Suit Gundam: Iron-Blooded Orphans, Black Clover, Hunter × Hunter (2011), Naruto: Shippuden, Space Dandy, Cowboy Bebop, Ghost in the Shell: S.A.C. 2nd GIG		
May 5, 2018– May 26, 2018	10:30 pm – 4 am	Dragon Ball Super, Dragon Ball Z Kai: The Final Chapters, My Hero Academia, FLCL, JoJo's Bizarre Adventure: Stardust Crusaders, Hunter × Hunter (2011), Black Clover, Naruto: Shippuden, Space Dandy, Cowboy Bebop, Ghost in the Shell: S.A.C. 2nd GIG	May 26: FLCL marathon (10:30 pm – 5 am)	
June 2, 2018– June 23, 2018	10:30 pm – 4 am	Dragon Ball Super, Dragon Ball Z Kai: The Final Chapters, My Hero Academia, FLCL Progressive, JoJo's Bizarre Adventure: Stardust Crusaders, Hunter × Hunter (2011), Black Clover, Naruto: Shippuden, Space Dandy, Cowboy Bebop, Lupin the Third Part IV		
June 30, 2018– August 4, 2018	10:30 pm – 4 am	Dragon Ball Super, My Hero Academia, FLCL Progressive, Pop Team Epic, JoJo's Bizarre Adventure: Stardust Crusaders, Hunter × Hunter (2011), Black Clover, Naruto: Shippuden, Space Dandy, Cowboy Bebop, Lupin the Third Part IV		
August 11, 2018	10:30 pm – 4 am	Dragon Ball Super, My Hero Academia, FLCL Progressive, Pop Team Epic, JoJo's Bizarre Adventure: Stardust Crusaders, Hunter × Hunter (2011), Black Clover, Naruto: Shippuden, One-Punch Man, Lupin the Third Part IV, Cowboy Bebop		
August 18, 2018	10 pm – 4 am	My Hero Academia, Dragon Ball Super, Attack on Titan, FLCL Progressive, Pop Team Epic, JoJo's Bizarre Adventure: Diamond Is Unbreakable, Hunter × Hunter (2011), Black Clover, Naruto: Shippuden, One-Punch Man, Lupin the Third Part IV, Cowboy Bebop		
August 25, 2018– September 1, 2018	10 pm – 4 am	My Hero Academia, Dragon Ball Super, Attack on Titan (2 episodes), Pop Team Epic, JoJo's Bizarre Adventure: Diamond Is Unbreakable, Hunter × Hunter (2011), Black Clover, Naruto: Shippuden, One-Punch Man, Lupin the Third Part IV, Cowboy Bebop	September 1: My Hero Academia marathon (10 pm – 4:30 am)	
September 8, 2018– September 22, 2018	10 pm – 4 am	My Hero Academia, Dragon Ball Super, Attack on Titan, FLCL Alternative, Pop Team Epic, JoJo's Bizarre Adventure: Diamond Is Unbreakable, Hunter × Hunter (2011), Black Clover, Naruto: Shippuden, One-Punch Man, Lupin the Third Part IV, Cowboy Bebop		
September 29, 2018– October 13, 2018	9 pm – 4 am	Dragon Ball Z Kai, My Hero Academia, Naruto: Shippuden, Boruto: Naruto Next Generations, Dragon Ball Super, FLCL Alternative, Attack on Titan, JoJo's Bizarre Adventure: Diamond Is Unbreakable, Black Clover, Hunter × Hunter (2011), One-Punch Man, Lupin the Third Part IV, Cowboy Bebop, Samurai Jack		
October 20, 2018	9 pm – 4 am	Dragon Ball Z Kai, My Hero Academia, Naruto: Shippuden, Boruto: Naruto Next Generations, Dragon Ball Super, FLCL Alternative, Attack on Titan, JoJo's Bizarre Adventure: Diamond Is Unbreakable, Black Clover, Hunter × Hunter (2011), One-Punch Man, Lupin the Third Part IV, Samurai Jack (2 episodes)		
October 27, 2018– November 3, 2018	9 pm – 4 am	Dragon Ball Z Kai, My Hero Academia, Naruto: Shippuden, Boruto: Naruto Next Generations, Dragon Ball Super, Mob Psycho 100, Attack on Titan, JoJo's Bizarre Adventure: Diamond Is Unbreakable, Black Clover, Hunter × Hunter (2011), FLCL Alternative, One-Punch Man, Lupin the Third Part IV, Samurai Jack		
November 10, 2018– December 1, 2018	9 pm – 4 am	Dragon Ball Z Kai, My Hero Academia, Naruto: Shippuden, Boruto: Naruto Next Generations, Dragon Ball Super, Mob Psycho 100, Attack on Titan, JoJo's Bizarre Adventure: Diamond Is Unbreakable, Black Clover, Hunter × Hunter (2011), FLCL Alternative, Pop Team Epic, Lupin the Third Part IV, Samurai Jack	November 17: Attack on Titan marathon (9:30 pm – 3:30 am)	
December 8, 2018	9 pm – 4 am	Dragon Ball Z Kai, My Hero Academia, Naruto: Shippuden, Boruto: Naruto Next Generations, Dragon Ball Super, Mob Psycho 100, Megalobox, JoJo's Bizarre Adventure: Diamond Is Unbreakable, Black Clover, Hunter × Hunter (2011), Attack on Titan, Pop Team Epic, Lupin the Third Part IV, Samurai Jack		
December 15, 2018– December 29, 2018	9 pm – 4 am	Dragon Ball Z Kai, My Hero Academia, Naruto: Shippuden, Boruto: Naruto Next Generations, Dragon Ball Super, Mob Psycho 100, Megalobox, JoJo's Bizarre Adventure: Diamond Is Unbreakable, Black Clover, Hunter × Hunter (2011), Attack On Titan, Pop Team Epic, Mobile Suit Gundam: Iron-Blooded Orphans, Samurai Jack	December 22: Dragon Ball Super marathon (9 pm – 4:30 am); December 29: Boruto: Naruto Next Generations marathon (9 pm – 2:30 am)	
January 5, 2019– February 2, 2019	11 pm – 5 am	Dragon Ball Super, Boruto: Naruto Next Generations, My Hero Academia, Mob Psycho 100, Megalobox, JoJo's Bizarre Adventure: Diamond Is Unbreakable, Black Clover, Hunter x Hunter, Naruto: Shippuden, Attack on Titan, Pop Team Epic, Mobile Suit Gundam: Iron-Blooded Orphans		
February 9, 2019	11 pm – 5 am	Dragon Ball Super, Boruto: Naruto Next Generations, My Hero Academia, Sword Art Online: Alicization (1 hour episode), JoJo's Bizarre Adventure: Diamond Is Unbreakable, Black Clover, Hunter x Hunter, Naruto: Shippuden, Attack on Titan, Pop Team Epic, Mobile Suit Gundam: Iron-Blooded Orphans		
February 16, 2019– March 23, 2019	11 pm – 4 am	Dragon Ball Super, Boruto: Naruto Next Generations, My Hero Academia, Sword Art Online: Alicization, Megalobox, JoJo's Bizarre Adventure: Diamond Is Unbreakable, Black Clover, Hunter x Hunter, Naruto: Shippuden, Attack on Titan	March 16: Broadcast error prevents Sword Art Online: Alicization episode 6 from airing six minutes to commercials after it froze, skipped for Megalobox episode 12 where the first half of its episode ran twice to fill up time and fix the schedule.; March 23: Proper airing of Sword Art Online: Alicization episode 6 originally scheduled.	
March 30, 2019– April 6, 2019	11 pm – 4 am	Dragon Ball Super, Boruto: Naruto Next Generations, My Hero Academia, Sword Art Online: Alicization (2 ep), JoJo's Bizarre Adventure: Diamond Is Unbreakable, Black Clover, Hunter x Hunter, Naruto: Shippuden, Attack on Titan		
April 13, 2019– May 18, 2019	11 pm – 4 am	Dragon Ball Super, My Hero Academia, The Promised Neverland, Sword Art Online: Alicization, JoJo's Bizarre Adventure: Diamond Is Unbreakable, Black Clover, Boruto: Naruto Next Generations, Naruto: Shippuden, Hunter x Hunter, Attack on Titan		
May 25, 2019– June 8, 2019	10:30 pm – 3:30 am	My Hero Academia, Dragon Ball Super, Attack on Titan, The Promised Neverland, Sword Art Online: Alicization, JoJo's Bizarre Adventure: Diamond Is Unbreakable, Black Clover, Boruto: Naruto Next Generations, Naruto: Shippuden, Hunter x Hunter		
June 15, 2019– June 29, 2019	10:30 pm – 3:30 am	My Hero Academia, Dragon Ball Super, Attack on Titan, The Promised Neverland, Sword Art Online: Alicization, Lupin the Third Part 5, Black Clover, Boruto: Naruto Next Generations, Naruto: Shippuden, Hunter x Hunter		
July 6, 2019– July 13, 2019	11 pm – 4 am	Dragon Ball Super, Attack on Titan, Sword Art Online: Alicization, Lupin the Third Part 5, Food Wars!: Shokugeki no Soma, Black Clover, Boruto: Naruto Next Generations, Naruto: Shippuden, Mobile Suit Gundam: The Origin – Advent of the Red Comet, My Hero Academia		
July 20, 2019	11 pm – 4 am	Dragon Ball Super, Attack on Titan (2 episodes), Lupin the Third Part 5, Food Wars!: Shokugeki no Soma, Black Clover, Boruto: Naruto Next Generations, Naruto: Shippuden, Mobile Suit Gundam: The Origin – Advent of the Red Comet, My Hero Academia		
July 27, 2019	11 pm – 4 am	Dragon Ball Super, Attack on Titan, Fire Force, Lupin the Third Part 5, Food Wars!: Shokugeki no Soma, Black Clover, Boruto: Naruto Next Generations, Naruto: Shippuden, Mobile Suit Gundam: The Origin – Advent of the Red Comet, My Hero Academia		
August 3, 2019– August 17, 2019	11 pm – 4 am	Dragon Ball Super, Gen:Lock, Fire Force, Lupin the Third Part 5, Food Wars!: Shokugeki no Soma, Black Clover, Boruto: Naruto Next Generations, Naruto: Shippuden, Mobile Suit Gundam: The Origin – Advent of the Red Comet, My Hero Academia		
August 24, 2019– September 28, 2019	11 pm – 4:30 am	Dragon Ball Super, Gen:Lock, Dr. Stone, Fire Force, Food Wars!: Shokugeki no Soma, Black Clover, Boruto: Naruto Next Generations, Naruto: Shippuden, Mobile Suit Gundam: The Origin – Advent of the Red Comet, Lupin the Third Part 5, My Hero Academia	September 28: New Dragon Ball Super episode, followed by Dragon Ball Super marathon	
October 5, 2019	11 pm – 4:30 am	Dragon Ball Super, Dr. Stone (2 episodes), Fire Force, Food Wars!: Shokugeki no Soma, Black Clover, Boruto: Naruto Next Generations, Naruto: Shippuden, Mobile Suit Gundam: The Origin – Advent of the Red Comet, Lupin the Third Part 5, My Hero Academia		
October 12, 2019– October 19, 2019	11 pm – 4:30 am	Dragon Ball Super, One-Punch Man, Dr. Stone, Fire Force, Food Wars!: Shokugeki no Soma, Demon Slayer: Kimetsu no Yaiba, Black Clover, Boruto: Naruto Next Generations, Naruto: Shippuden, Lupin the Third Part 5, My Hero Academia		
October 26, 2019– November 2, 2019	11 pm – 4:30 am	Dragon Ball Super, One-Punch Man, Dr. Stone, Fire Force, Food Wars!: Shokugeki no Soma, Demon Slayer: Kimetsu no Yaiba, Black Clover, JoJo's Bizarre Adventure: Golden Wind, Naruto: Shippuden, Lupin the Third Part 5, My Hero Academia		
November 9, 2019– December 28, 2019	11 pm – 4:30 am	My Hero Academia, One-Punch Man, Dr. Stone, Fire Force, Food Wars!: Shokugeki no Soma, Demon Slayer: Kimetsu no Yaiba, Black Clover, JoJo's Bizarre Adventure: Golden Wind, Naruto: Shippuden, Lupin the Third Part 5, Attack on Titan	November 9 – December 14: The Forge event; November 30: New My Hero Academia and One-Punch Man episodes, followed by Food Wars!: Shokugeki no Soma marathon; December 14: Lupin the Third: Is Lupin Still Burning? OVA at 3 – 3:45 am, followed by Scavengers short; December 21: One-Punch Man marathon; December 28: Dr. Stone marathon	

==== 2020–present ====
List of programs broadcast on Adult Swim's Toonami block (2020–present)
Broadcast dates (Note: All broadcast dates shown are Saturday, per all promotional material by Adult Swim. In the Eastern Time Zone, the block has either started sometime before or directly at midnight, which is effectively Sunday on a calendar day.)	Time	Programs featured	Special programming	Notes and refs
January 4, 2020– January 11, 2020	11 pm – 4:30 am	My Hero Academia, Dr. Stone, One-Punch Man, Fire Force, Food Wars!: Shokugeki no Soma, Demon Slayer: Kimetsu no Yaiba, Black Clover, JoJo's Bizarre Adventure: Golden Wind, Naruto: Shippuden, The Promised Neverland, Attack on Titan		
January 18, 2020– February 1, 2020	11 pm – 4:30 am	My Hero Academia, Dr. Stone, Sword Art Online: Alicization – War of Underworld, Fire Force, Food Wars!: Shokugeki no Soma, Demon Slayer: Kimetsu no Yaiba, Black Clover, JoJo's Bizarre Adventure: Golden Wind, Naruto: Shippuden, The Promised Neverland, Attack on Titan		
February 8, 2020– February 15, 2020	11 pm – 4 am	My Hero Academia, Dr. Stone, Sword Art Online: Alicization – War of Underworld, Demon Slayer: Kimetsu no Yaiba, Food Wars!: Shokugeki no Soma, Black Clover, JoJo's Bizarre Adventure: Golden Wind, Naruto: Shippuden, The Promised Neverland, Attack on Titan		
February 22, 2020	11:30 pm – 4 am	Dr. Stone, Sword Art Online: Alicization – War of Underworld, Demon Slayer: Kimetsu no Yaiba, Food Wars!: Shokugeki no Soma, Black Clover, JoJo's Bizarre Adventure: Golden Wind, Naruto: Shippuden, The Promised Neverland, Attack on Titan		
February 29, 2020– April 11, 2020	11:30 pm – 3 am	My Hero Academia, Sword Art Online: Alicization – War of Underworld, Demon Slayer: Kimetsu no Yaiba, Food Wars!: Shokugeki no Soma, Black Clover, JoJo's Bizarre Adventure: Golden Wind, Naruto: Shippuden	April 11: Dragon Ball Z Kai marathon	
April 18, 2020	12 – 3 am	My Hero Academia, Demon Slayer: Kimetsu no Yaiba, Food Wars!: Shokugeki no Soma, Black Clover, JoJo's Bizarre Adventure: Golden Wind, Naruto: Shippuden		
April 25, 2020– May 2, 2020	12 – 3 am	My Hero Academia, Demon Slayer: Kimetsu no Yaiba, Paranoia Agent, Black Clover, JoJo's Bizarre Adventure: Golden Wind, Naruto: Shippuden		
May 9, 2020– May 30, 2020	12 – 3 am	My Hero Academia, Paranoia Agent, Mob Psycho 100, Black Clover, JoJo's Bizarre Adventure: Golden Wind, Naruto: Shippuden		
June 6, 2020– July 4, 2020	12 – 3 am	My Hero Academia, Paranoia Agent, Mob Psycho 100, Black Clover, Ballmastrz: 9009 (2 ep), Naruto: Shippuden	July 4: Dragon Ball Super marathon (12 am – 4 am)	
July 11, 2020– July 25, 2020	12 – 3:30 am	Dragon Ball Super, Paranoia Agent, Mob Psycho 100, Black Clover, Ballmastrz: 9009 (2 ep), Naruto: Shippuden, Samurai Jack	July 25: Block airs off the clock due to promotional tie-in with the Adult Swim Con virtual event. Samurai Jack preempted.	
August 1, 2020	12 – 3:30 am	Dragon Ball Super, JoJo's Bizarre Adventure: Golden Wind, Mob Psycho 100, Black Clover, Ballmastrz: 9009 (2 ep), Naruto: Shippuden, Samurai Jack		
August 8, 2020– August 22, 2020	12 – 3:30 am	Dragon Ball Super, JoJo's Bizarre Adventure: Golden Wind, Fire Force, Black Clover, Ballmastrz: 9009 (2 ep), Naruto: Shippuden, Samurai Jack	DC FanDome featured movies: August 15: Batman: Year One & Batman: The Dark Knight Returns Part 1; August 22: Batman: Gotham Knight & Batman: The Dark Knight Returns Part 2	
August 29, 2020– October 3, 2020	12 – 3:30 am	Dragon Ball Super, JoJo's Bizarre Adventure: Golden Wind, Assassination Classroom, Black Clover, Fire Force, Naruto: Shippuden, Samurai Jack		
October 10, 2020– October 31, 2020	12 – 3:30 am	Dragon Ball Super, JoJo's Bizarre Adventure: Golden Wind, Assassination Classroom, Black Clover, Fire Force, Naruto: Shippuden, Demon Slayer: Kimetsu no Yaiba	October 17: Lineup runs from 1 am – 4 am due to a special Run the Jewels concert at midnight. Black Clover preempted.; October 31: The Promised Neverland marathon (12 am – 5 am, including Daylight Saving Time)	
November 7, 2020– January 2, 2021	12 – 3:30 am	Dragon Ball Super, Sword Art Online: Alicization – War of Underworld, Fire Force, Assassination Classroom, Gēmusetto: Death Beat(s), Naruto: Shippuden, Demon Slayer: Kimetsu no Yaiba	November 28: Primal marathon (12 am – 5 am); December 19: Wonder Woman: Bloodlines & Justice League: The New Frontier; December 26: Cowboy Bebop marathon.	Gēmusetto contains 2 episodes per time slot.
January 9, 2021	12 – 4 am	Dragon Ball Super, Attack on Titan, Sword Art Online: Alicization – War of Underworld, Fire Force, Assassination Classroom, Gēmusetto: Death Beat(s), Naruto: Shippuden, Demon Slayer: Kimetsu no Yaiba		Gēmusetto contains 2 episodes per timeslot.
January 16, 2021– February 6, 2021	12 – 4 am	Dragon Ball Super, Attack on Titan, Sword Art Online: Alicization – War of Underworld, Fire Force, Assassination Classroom, SSSS.Gridman, Naruto: Shippuden, Demon Slayer: Kimetsu no Yaiba	February 6–27: Cosmo Samurai	
February 13, 2021– February 20, 2021	12 – 4 am	Dragon Ball Super, Attack on Titan, Assassination Classroom, Fire Force, Black Clover, SSSS.Gridman, Naruto: Shippuden, Demon Slayer: Kimetsu no Yaiba		
February 27, 2021– April 3, 2021	12 – 4 am	Dragon Ball Super, Attack on Titan, Food Wars!: Shokugeki no Soma, Fire Force, Black Clover, SSSS.Gridman, Naruto: Shippuden, Demon Slayer: Kimetsu no Yaiba		
April 10, 2021– May 1, 2021	12 – 4 am	Dragon Ball Super, Attack on Titan, Food Wars!: Shokugeki no Soma, The Promised Neverland, Fire Force, Black Clover, Naruto: Shippuden, Demon Slayer: Kimetsu no Yaiba		
May 8, 2021	12 – 4 am	Dragon Ball Super, My Hero Academia, Food Wars!: Shokugeki no Soma, The Promised Neverland, Fire Force, Black Clover, Naruto: Shippuden, Attack on Titan		
May 15, 2021– May 22, 2021	12 – 4 am	Dragon Ball Super, My Hero Academia, Dr. Stone, Food Wars!: Shokugeki no Soma, The Promised Neverland, Black Clover, Naruto: Shippuden, Attack on Titan		
May 29, 2021– June 19, 2021	12 – 4 am	My Hero Academia, Dr. Stone, Food Wars!: Shokugeki no Soma, The Promised Neverland, Black Clover, Naruto: Shippuden, Attack on Titan, Dragon Ball Super		
June 26, 2021– August 7, 2021	12 – 4 am	My Hero Academia, Dr. Stone, Yashahime: Princess Half-Demon, Food Wars!: Shokugeki no Soma, Black Clover, Naruto: Shippuden, Attack on Titan, Dragon Ball Super	July 17: Toonami Interstitial at 3 am, remainder of the schedule pushed back by 15 minutes.; July 31: Double premieres of My Hero Academia and Food Wars!: Shokugeki no Soma. Dr. Stone ends the previous week, while Black Clover was preempted.; August 7: Harley Quinn marathon (10:30 pm – 5 am)	
August 14, 2021– August 28, 2021	12 – 4 am	Fena: Pirate Princess, My Hero Academia, Yashahime: Princess Half-Demon, Food Wars!: Shokugeki no Soma, Black Clover, Naruto: Shippuden, Attack on Titan, Dragon Ball Super	August 14: Fena: Pirate Princess double episode premiere. My Hero Academia and Yashahime: Princess Half-Demon move back a half hour. Food Wars!: Shokugeki no Soma was preempted.	
September 4, 2021– October 30, 2021	12 – 4 am	Fena: Pirate Princess, My Hero Academia, Yashahime: Princess Half-Demon, Food Wars!: Shokugeki no Soma, Black Clover, Naruto: Shippuden, Dr. Stone, Dragon Ball Super	October 9: Black Clover double episode finale. Naruto: Shippuden preempted.; DC FanDome featured movies: October 16: Batman Ninja and Batman: Under the Red Hood, followed by Toonami interstitial. (12:00 am – 4:30 am) Everything except Fena: Pirate Princess was preempted.; October 23: Batman: The Long Halloween Parts 1 and 2. (12:00 am – 4:30 am) Everything except Fena: Pirate Princess was preempted.; October 30: Fena: Pirate Princess marathon, followed by Toonami interstitial (10:30 pm – 5 am)	
November 6, 2021	12 – 4 am	My Hero Academia (2 ep.), Yashahime: Princess Half-Demon, Food Wars!: Shokugeki no Soma, Naruto: Shippuden, Fena: Pirate Princess, Dr. Stone, Dragon Ball Super, Toonami interstitials	Due to Daylight Saving Time, a one-hour Toonami interstitial block played at 3 am.	
November 13, 2021– January 1, 2022	12 – 4 am	Blade Runner: Black Lotus, Yashahime: Princess Half-Demon (2 ep.), Food Wars!: Shokugeki no Soma, Naruto: Shippuden, Fena: Pirate Princess, Dr. Stone, Dragon Ball Super	November 13: Blade Runner: Black Lotus double episode premiere.; November 26: Special Friday night schedule with Blade Runner Black Out 2022, Blade Runner 2049, and the first three episodes of Blade Runner: Black Lotus (11 pm – 4:30 am); December 4: Blade Runner: Black Lotus marathon. Everything except Dr. Stone and Dragon Ball Super was preempted.; December 11: Yashahime: Princess Half-Demon triple episode season finale originally scheduled. Due to a broadcast error, episode 21 was shown instead of episode 24. Food Wars! Shokugeki no Soma ends its run back on November 27.; December 18: The Animatrix followed by four Toonami interstitials. Everything except Blade Runner: Black Lotus and Dragon Ball Super was preempted.; December 25: Blade Runner: Black Lotus marathon. Everything except Dragon Ball Super was preempted.; January 1: Cowboy Bebop marathon. Everything except Blade Runner: Black Lotus and the proper airing of the Yashahime: Princess Half-Demon season finale was preempted.	
January 8, 2022	12 – 4 am	Blade Runner: Black Lotus, Assassination Classroom (2 ep.), Naruto: Shippuden (3 ep.), Cowboy Bebop (2 ep.)		
January 15, 2022	12 – 4 am	Blade Runner: Black Lotus, Assassination Classroom (2 ep.), Made in Abyss, Naruto: Shippuden (2 ep.), Cowboy Bebop (2 ep.)		
January 22, 2022– January 29, 2022	12 – 4 am	Blade Runner: Black Lotus, Assassination Classroom, Made in Abyss, One Piece (2 ep.), Naruto: Shippuden (2 ep.), Cowboy Bebop		
February 5, 2022	12 – 4 am	Blade Runner: Black Lotus, Shenmue, Assassination Classroom, Made in Abyss, One Piece (2 ep.), Naruto: Shippuden, Cowboy Bebop		
February 12, 2022– April 9, 2022	12 – 4 am	Shenmue, Attack on Titan, Assassination Classroom, Made in Abyss, One Piece (2 ep.), Naruto: Shippuden, Cowboy Bebop	February 19 – March 12: Cosmo Samurai II; March 19 – 26: The Return; April 9: Made in Abyss one-hour season finale. Due to this, the first slot airing of One Piece was preempted.	
April 16, 2022– April 30, 2022	12 – 4 am	Shenmue, Attack on Titan, Assassination Classroom, Lupin the 3rd Part 6, One Piece (2 ep.), Naruto: Shippuden, Cowboy Bebop		
May 7, 2022	12 – 4 am	Assassination Classroom, Lupin the 3rd Part 6, One Piece (2 ep.), Naruto: Shippuden (2 ep.), Shenmue, Cowboy Bebop		
May 14, 2022– June 12, 2022	12 – 4 am	Primal, Assassination Classroom, Lupin the 3rd Part 6, One Piece (2 ep.), Naruto: Shippuden, Shenmue, Attack on Titan		
June 19, 2022– July 16, 2022	12 – 4 am	Primal, Lupin the 3rd Part 6, One Piece (2 ep.), Naruto: Shippuden (2 ep.), Shenmue, Attack on Titan	July 2: Shenmue marathon. Everything except Primal was preempted.	
July 23, 2022	12 – 4 am	Primal (2 ep.), Lupin the 3rd Part 6, One Piece (2 ep.), Naruto: Shippuden, Shenmue, Attack on Titan		
July 30, 2022– August 6, 2022	12 – 4 am	Primal, Yashahime: Princess Half-Demon, Lupin the 3rd Part 6, One Piece (2 ep.), Naruto: Shippuden, Shenmue, Attack on Titan		
August 13, 2022– September 17, 2022	12 – 4 am	Primal, Yashahime: Princess Half-Demon, Lupin the 3rd Part 6, One Piece (2 ep.), Naruto: Shippuden, Blade Runner: Black Lotus, Made in Abyss	September 17: Batman: Hush and Batman: Mask of the Phantasm, followed by two Toonami interstitials. Everything except Primal was preempted. (12 am – 4:30 am)	
September 24, 2022	12 – 4 am	Primal, Yashahime: Princess Half-Demon, Lupin the 3rd Part 6, One Piece (2 ep.), Naruto: Shippuden, Made in Abyss (2 ep.)		
October 1, 2022– October 15, 2022	12 – 4 am	Housing Complex C, Yashahime: Princess Half-Demon, Lupin the 3rd Part 6, One Piece (2 ep.), Naruto: Shippuden, Made in Abyss (2 ep.)		
October 22, 2022	12 – 4 am	Housing Complex C, Yashahime: Princess Half-Demon, One Piece (2 ep.), Naruto: Shippuden (2 ep.), Made in Abyss (1 hr.)		
October 29, 2022	12 – 4 am	Housing Complex C (4 ep.), The Promised Neverland (4 ep.)		
November 5, 2022– February 25, 2023	12 – 3 am	My Hero Academia, Made in Abyss, Yashahime: Princess Half-Demon, One Piece, Naruto: Shippuden, Primal	November 5: Two extra episodes of Primal air during Daylight Saving Time.; November 26: My Hero Academia marathon; December 24: Block airs from 12 – 2 am due to an encore of the Adult Swim Yule Log. Primal marathon.; December 31: FLCL marathon (12 - 3:15 am); February 4: Yashahime: Princess Half-Demon double episode season finale. One Piece preempted.; February 11: Made in Abyss 1 hour episode season finale. Yashahime: Princess Half-Demon finishes its season the previous week.; February 18: Injustice airing. Primal airs 15 minutes earlier, and the block ends with a Toonami interstitial. Everything else except My Hero Academia was preempted.; February 25: Ballmastrz: Rubicon followed by Justice League vs. the Fatal Five and a Toonami interstitial. Everything except My Hero Academia was preempted.	
March 4, 2023– March 11, 2023	12 – 3 am	My Hero Academia (2 ep.), One Piece (2 ep.), Naruto: Shippuden, Primal	March 5: The English dubbed version of Toriko x One Piece x Dragon Ball Z Collaboration Special.	
March 18, 2023– April 22, 2023	12 – 3 am	My Hero Academia (2 ep.), Food Wars! Shokugeki no Soma, One Piece, Naruto: Shippuden, Primal		
April 29, 2023	12 – 3 am	Primal (2 ep.), Food Wars! Shokugeki no Soma, One Piece, Naruto: Shippuden, My Hero Academia		
May 6, 2023	12 – 3 am	Unicorn: Warriors Eternal (2 ep.), Food Wars! Shokugeki no Soma, One Piece, Naruto: Shippuden, My Hero Academia		
May 13, 2023– May 27, 2023	12 – 3 am	Unicorn: Warriors Eternal, Primal, Food Wars! Shokugeki no Soma, One Piece, Naruto: Shippuden, My Hero Academia	May 27: Unicorn: Warriors Eternal marathon.	
June 3, 2023– July 1, 2023	12 – 3 am	Unicorn: Warriors Eternal, Dr. Stone, Food Wars! Shokugeki no Soma, One Piece, Naruto: Shippuden, My Hero Academia	June 10: Lineup runs from 12 to 3:15 am due to a 45-minute episode of Unicorn: Warriors Eternal. The lineup thereafter is pushed back by 15 minutes.; July 1: Unicorn: Warriors Eternal marathon (12 am – 3:15 am)	
July 8, 2023	12 – 3 am	My Adventures with Superman (2 ep.), Dr. Stone, One Piece, Naruto: Shippuden, My Hero Academia		
July 15, 2023– September 2, 2023	12 – 3 am	My Adventures with Superman, Dr. Stone, FLCL, One Piece, Naruto: Shippuden, My Hero Academia	July 15: Dr. Stone episode 42 accidentally aired instead of episode 41 due to a broadcast error.; July 22: Proper airing of Dr. Stone episode 41 originally scheduled.; July 29: Proper airing of Dr. Stone episode 42 originally scheduled.; August 19: Lineup runs from 12 to 3:15 am due to a 45-minute episode of FLCL. The lineup thereafter is pushed back by 15 minutes.; August 26: FLCL: Progressive marathon. Everything except My Adventures with Superman and Dr. Stone pre-empted. (12 - 4 am); September 2: FLCL: Alternative marathon. Everything except My Adventures with Superman pre-empted. (12 - 3:30 am)	
September 9, 2023	12 – 3 am	FLCL: Grunge, Attack on Titan: The Final Chapters Part 1, Naruto: Shippuden, My Hero Academia		
September 16, 2023– September 23, 2023	12 – 3 am	FLCL: Grunge, One Piece (2 ep.), Naruto: Shippuden (2 ep.), My Hero Academia		
September 30, 2023– November 4, 2023	12 – 3 am	FLCL: Shoegaze, One Piece (2 ep.), Naruto: Shippuden (2 ep.), My Hero Academia	October 21: FLCL: Grunge marathon. One Piece pre-empted.; October 28: Block is split between an FLCL: Shoegaze marathon and a My Hero Academia marathon.; November 4: Attack on Titan: The Final Chapters Part 1 airs twice. The first two remastered episodes of IGPX air as Daylight Saving Time filler.	
November 11, 2023	12 – 3 am	Demon Slayer: Kimetsu no Yaiba (2 ep.), Dr. Stone, One Piece, Naruto: Shippuden, IGPX		
November 18, 2023– December 9, 2023	12 – 3 am	Demon Slayer: Kimetsu no Yaiba, Dr. Stone, One Piece (2 ep.), Naruto: Shippuden, IGPX		
December 16, 2023– December 30, 2023	12 – 3 am	Demon Slayer: Kimetsu no Yaiba, Dr. Stone (2 ep.), One Piece, Naruto: Shippuden, IGPX	December 23: Dr. Stone marathon (12 – 3 am); December 30: Demon Slayer: Kimetsu no Yaiba marathon (12 – 3:30 am)	
January 6, 2024	12 – 3 am	Attack on Titan: The Final Chapters Part 2, Naruto: Shippuden, IGPX		
January 13, 2024	12 – 3 am	Demon Slayer: Kimetsu no Yaiba (1 hr), Dr. Stone, One Piece, Naruto: Shippuden, IGPX		
January 20, 2024– February 3, 2024	12 – 3 am	Demon Slayer: Kimetsu no Yaiba, Dr. Stone, Lycoris Recoil, One Piece, Naruto: Shippuden, IGPX		
February 10, 2024– February 17, 2024	12 – 3:30 am	Ninja Kamui, Demon Slayer: Kimetsu no Yaiba, Lycoris Recoil, One Piece, Naruto: Shippuden, IGPX, Ninja Kamui		Ninja Kamui airs English dubbed at midnight and in Japanese with English subtitles at 3:00 am.
February 24, 2024– March 23, 2024	12 – 3:30 am	Ninja Kamui, Demon Slayer: Kimetsu no Yaiba, Lycoris Recoil, One Piece, Naruto: Shippuden, Dragon Ball Z Kai, Ninja Kamui	March 16: Dragon Ball Z Kai marathon. Subtitled episode of Ninja Kamui airs an hour and a half earlier. One Piece and Naruto: Shippuden pre-empted. (12 - 6 AM); March 23: Block airs from 12 - 3:45 AM due to the 45-minute season finale of Demon Slayer: Kimetsu no Yaiba. The rest of the lineup thereafter is pushed ahead by 15 minutes.	Ninja Kamui airs English dubbed at midnight and in Japanese with English subtitles at 3:00 am.
March 30, 2024– April 13, 2024	12 – 3:30 am	Ninja Kamui, Zom 100: Bucket List of the Dead, Lycoris Recoil, One Piece, Naruto: Shippuden, Dragon Ball Z Kai, Ninja Kamui		Ninja Kamui airs English dubbed at midnight and in Japanese with English subtitles at 3:00 am.
April 20, 2024– May 18, 2024	12 – 3:30 am	Ninja Kamui, Zom 100: Bucket List of the Dead, One Piece (2 ep.), Naruto: Shippuden, Dragon Ball Z Kai, Ninja Kamui	May 11–18: English dubbed Ninja Kamui marathons.	Ninja Kamui airs English dubbed at midnight and in Japanese with English subtitles at 3:00 am.
May 25, 2024	12 – 3:30 am	My Adventures With Superman (2 ep.), One Piece, Naruto: Shippuden, Dragon Ball Z Kai, Demon Slayer: Kimetsu no Yaiba (1 hr)		
June 1, 2024– June 29, 2024	12 – 3:30 am	My Adventures With Superman, Zom 100: Bucket List of the Dead, One Piece, Naruto: Shippuden, Dragon Ball Z Kai, Ninja Kamui, Demon Slayer: Kimetsu no Yaiba		Ninja Kamui episodes are English dubbed.
July 6, 2024	12 – 4 am	My Adventures With Superman, Zom 100: Bucket List of the Dead, One Piece, Naruto: Shippuden, Dragon Ball Z Kai, Ninja Kamui, Demon Slayer: Kimetsu no Yaiba (2 ep.)		Ninja Kamui episodes are English dubbed.
July 13, 2024	12 – 4 am	My Adventures With Superman, One Piece (2 ep.), Naruto: Shippuden, Dragon Ball Z Kai, Ninja Kamui, Demon Slayer: Kimetsu no Yaiba (2 ep.)		Ninja Kamui episodes are English dubbed.
July 20, 2024– August 3, 2024	12 – 3:45 am	My Adventures With Superman, One Piece (2 ep.), Naruto: Shippuden, Dragon Ball Z Kai, Ninja Kamui, Demon Slayer: Kimetsu no Yaiba (45 min.)	July 27: My Adventures With Superman marathon (12 – 5 am); August 3: Demon Slayer: Kimetsu no Yaiba marathon (12 – 3:30 am)	Ninja Kamui episodes are English dubbed.
August 10, 2024	12 – 3:30 am	Demon Slayer: Kimetsu no Yaiba (1 hr,), One Piece, Naruto: Shippuden, Dragon Ball Z Kai, Ninja Kamui, My Hero Academia		Ninja Kamui episodes are English dubbed.
August 17, 2024– August 31, 2024	12 – 3:30 am	Rick and Morty: The Anime, Demon Slayer: Kimetsu no Yaiba, One Piece, Naruto: Shippuden, Dragon Ball Z Kai, Ninja Kamui, My Hero Academia		Rick and Morty: The Anime episodes are in Japanese with English subtitles. Ninja Kamui episodes are English dubbed.
September 7, 2024	12 – 3:30 am	Rick and Morty: The Anime, Demon Slayer: Kimetsu no Yaiba, One Piece (2 ep.), Dragon Ball Z Kai, Ninja Kamui, My Hero Academia		Rick and Morty: The Anime episodes are in Japanese with English subtitles. Ninja Kamui episodes are English dubbed.
September 14, 2024– September 21, 2024	12 – 3:30 am	Rick and Morty: The Anime, Demon Slayer: Kimetsu no Yaiba, One Piece (2 ep.), Dragon Ball Z Kai, My Hero Academia (2 ep.)		Rick and Morty: The Anime episodes are in Japanese with English subtitles.
September 28, 2024	12 – 3:30 am	Rick and Morty: The Anime, Uzumaki, Demon Slayer: Kimetsu no Yaiba, One Piece, Dragon Ball Z Kai, My Hero Academia (2 ep.)		Rick and Morty: The Anime and Uzumaki episodes are in Japanese with English subtitles.
October 5, 2024– October 26, 2024	12 – 3:45 am	Rick and Morty: The Anime, Uzumaki, Demon Slayer: Kimetsu no Yaiba, One Piece, Dragon Ball Z Kai, My Hero Academia (2 ep.)	October 19: Block airs off the clock due to 33-minute season finale of Rick and Morty: The Anime and 63-minute season finale Demon Slayer: Kimetsu no Yaiba. One Piece pre-empted. A Toonami interstitial airs after Dragon Ball Z Kai, allowing the two episodes of My Hero Academia to air back on the clock. (12 - 4 AM).; October 26: Uzumaki marathon (Japanese with English subtitles). Everything except My Hero Academia is pre-empted. (12 - 3:30 AM)	Rick and Morty: The Anime and Uzumaki episodes are in Japanese with English subtitles. Uzumaki episodes run for 45 minutes.
November 2, 2024	12 – 3:30 am	Invincible Fight Girl (2 ep.), Blue Exorcist, One Piece, My Hero Academia (2 ep.), Invincible Fight Girl (2 ep.), Rick and Morty: The Anime	Due to Daylight Saving Time, the double-episode premiere of Invincible Fight Girl encores at 2:00 am	Rick and Morty: The Anime episodes are English dubbed.
November 9, 2024– November 30, 2024	12 – 3:30 am	Invincible Fight Girl, Mashle, Blue Exorcist, One Piece, Dragon Ball Z Kai, My Hero Academia, Rick and Morty: The Anime		Rick and Morty: The Anime episodes are English dubbed.
December 7, 2024– January 4, 2025	12 – 3:30 am	Invincible Fight Girl, Mashle, Blue Exorcist, One Piece, Dragon Ball Z Kai (2 ep.), Rick and Morty: The Anime	December 21: Invincible Fight Girl double-episode season finale followed by a Mashle marathon. (12 - 4 AM); December 28: English-dubbed Rick and Morty: The Anime marathon. (12 - 5 AM); January 4: English-dubbed Uzumaki marathon. Everything except the second airing of Dragon Ball Z Kai and Rick and Morty: The Anime are pre-empted.	Rick and Morty: The Anime episodes are English dubbed.
January 11, 2025–January 18, 2025	12 – 3:30 am	Mashle, Invincible Fight Girl, Blue Exorcist, One Piece, Dragon Ball Z Kai, Naruto, Rick and Morty: The Anime		Rick and Morty: The Anime episodes are English dubbed.
January 25, 2025–February 15, 2025	12 – 3:30 am	Mashle, Invincible Fight Girl, Blue Exorcist, One Piece, Dragon Ball Z Kai, Naruto, Sailor Moon	February 8: Censored version of Naruto episode 5 accidentally aired due to a broadcast error.	
February 22, 2025	12 – 3:30 am	FLCL: Grunge, Blue Exorcist (2 ep.), One Piece, Dragon Ball Z Kai, Naruto, Sailor Moon		
March 1, 2025	12 – 3:30 am	FLCL: Grunge, Common Side Effects, Blue Exorcist, One Piece, Dragon Ball Z Kai, Naruto, Sailor Moon		
March 8, 2025	12 – 4:30 am	FLCL: Grunge, Common Side Effects, Blue Exorcist, One Piece (2 ep.), Naruto, Sailor Moon	The schedule airs in full. Due to Daylight Saving Time, One Piece airs at 1:30 am and 3:00 am.	
March 15, 2025–March 29, 2025	12 – 3:30 am	FLCL: Shoegaze, Common Side Effects, Blue Exorcist, One Piece (2 ep.), Naruto, Sailor Moon		
April 5, 2025–May 10, 2025	12 – 3:30 am	Lazarus, Common Side Effects, Blue Exorcist, One Piece (2 ep.), Naruto, Sailor Moon	April 26: Ginger Root's Shinbangumi: A Music Movie airs at 3:00 am. Sailor Moon pre-empted (12 - 4 AM); May 10: English dubbed Lazarus marathon.	Lazarus episodes are English dubbed.
May 17, 2025–June 7, 2025	12 – 3:30 am	Lazarus, Bleach: Thousand-Year Blood War, Blue Exorcist: Kyoto Saga, One Piece (2 ep.), Naruto, Sailor Moon		Lazarus episodes are English dubbed.
June 14, 2025–July 12, 2025	12 – 3:30 am	Lazarus, Dragon Ball Daima, Bleach: Thousand-Year Blood War, Blue Exorcist: Kyoto Saga, One Piece, Naruto, Sailor Moon	June 14: Block runs from 12 - 3:45 AM due to the 45-minute series premiere of Dragon Ball Daima. The lineup thereafter is pushed ahead by 15 minutes.; July 5: My Adventures with Superman marathon (12 - 5 AM); July 12: Lazarus English-subbed marathon (11 PM - 5:30 AM)	Lazarus episodes are English dubbed.
July 19, 2025	12 – 3:30 am	Dragon Ball Daima (2 ep.), Bleach: Thousand-Year Blood War, Blue Exorcist: Kyoto Saga, One Piece, Lazarus, Naruto		Lazarus episodes are in Japanese with English subtitles.
July 26, 2025–August 16, 2025	12 – 3:30 am	Dragon Ball Daima, Dandadan, Bleach: Thousand-Year Blood War, Blue Exorcist: Kyoto Saga, One Piece, Lazarus, Naruto		Lazarus episodes are in Japanese with English subtitles.
August 23, 2025–October 11, 2025	12 – 3:30 am	Dragon Ball Daima, Dandadan, Bleach: Thousand-Year Blood War, Blue Exorcist: Shimane Illuminati Saga, One Piece, Lazarus, Naruto		Lazarus episodes are in Japanese with English subtitles.
October 18, 2025–November 1, 2025	12 – 3:30 am	Dragon Ball Daima, Bleach: Thousand-Year Blood War, Blue Exorcist: Shimane Illuminati Saga (2 ep.), One Piece, Dandadan, Naruto	October 25: English-dubbed Uzumaki marathon. Everything except Dragon Ball Daima and Bleach: Thousand-Year Blood War is pre-empted.; November 1: Commercial-free FLCL: Shoegaze marathon and a Toonami interstitial pre-empt Dandadan and airs in the Daylight Saving Time hour.	
November 8, 2025–December 27, 2025	12 – 3:30 am	Bleach: Thousand-Year Blood War, Blue Exorcist: Beyond the Snow Saga, Mashle, One Piece, Dandadan, Dragon Ball Daima, Naruto	November 8: Lineup airs from 12 - 3:45 AM due to the extended first episode of Dragon Ball Daima. Naruto airs 15 minutes later.; December 27: Dandadan marathon.	
January 3, 2026–January 10, 2026	12 – 4 am	Bleach: Thousand-Year Blood War, Blue Exorcist: Beyond the Snow Saga, Mashle, One Piece, Dandadan, Dragon Ball Daima, Zom 100: Bucket List of the Dead, Rick and Morty: The Anime		Rick and Morty: The Anime episodes are English dubbed.
January 17, 2026–January 31, 2026	12 – 4 am	Primal, Bleach: Thousand-Year Blood War, Blue Exorcist: Beyond the Snow Saga, Mashle, One Piece, Dragon Ball Daima, Zom 100: Bucket List of the Dead, Rick and Morty: The Anime		Rick and Morty: The Anime episodes are English dubbed.
February 7, 2026–March 7, 2026	12 – 4 am	Primal, Bleach: Thousand-Year Blood War, Blue Lock, Tokyo Revengers, One Piece, Dragon Ball Daima, Zom 100: Bucket List of the Dead, Rick and Morty: The Anime		Rick and Morty: The Anime episodes are English dubbed.
March 14, 2026–March 21, 2026	12 – 4 am	Rooster Fighter, Primal, Blue Lock, Tokyo Revengers, One Piece, Dragon Ball Daima, Zom 100: Bucket List of the Dead, Rooster Fighter		
March 28, 2026	12 – 4 am	Rooster Fighter, Dandadan, Blue Lock, Tokyo Revengers, One Piece, Dragon Ball Daima, My Adventures with Superman, Rooster Fighter		
April 4, 2026–June 6, 2026	12 – 4 am	Rooster Fighter, Dandadan, Blue Lock, Tokyo Revengers, One Piece, Ninja Kamui, My Adventures with Superman, Rooster Fighter	June 6: Rooster Fighter marathon (11 PM - 5 AM)	Ninja Kamui episodes are English dubbed.
June 13, 2026–June 20, 2026	12 – 4 am	My Adventures with Superman, Dandadan, Blue Lock, Tokyo Revengers, One Piece, Ninja Kamui, Blue Exorcist, My Adventures with Superman		Ninja Kamui episodes are English dubbed.
June 27, 2026–July 4, 2026	12 – 4 am	My Adventures with Superman, Blue Lock, Tokyo Revengers, One Piece, IGPX, Ninja Kamui, Blue Exorcist, My Adventures with Superman		Ninja Kamui episodes are English dubbed.
July 11, 2026–July 25, 2026	12 – 4 am	My Adventures with Superman, Blue Lock, Tokyo Revengers, One Piece, IGPX, Blue Exorcist (2 ep.), My Adventures with Superman		
August 1, 2026–August 15, 2026	12 – 4 am	My Adventures with Superman, FLCL: Alternative (2 ep.), One Piece, IGPX, Blue Exorcist (2 ep.), My Adventures with Superman		
August 22, 2026–August 29, 2026	12 – 4 am	My Adventures with Superman (5 ep.), Blue Exorcist (2 ep.), FLCL: Grunge		
September 5, 2026	12 – 4 am	Scavengers Reign (3 ep.), One Piece, IGPX, Blue Exorcist, FLCL: Grunge		Due to the extended length of the Scavengers Reign episodes, two Toonami interstitials air before One Piece to keep the schedule on the clock.
September 12, 2026–September 19, 2026	12 – 4 am	Scavengers Reign (3 ep.), One Piece, IGPX (2 ep.), Blue Exorcist, FLCL: Shoegaze	September 19: A Toonami interstitial airs before Scavengers Reign, causing the block to start four minutes earlier.	
September 26, 2026	12 – 4 am	Scavengers Reign (3 ep.), IGPX, Lazarus, Blue Exorcist, FLCL: Shoegaze		Due to the extended length of the Scavengers Reign episodes, a Toonami interstitial airs before IGPX to keep the schedule on the clock. One Piece is preempted. Lazarus episodes are English dubbed.
October 3, 2026	12 – 4:30 am	Get Jiro (2 ep.), One Piece (2 ep.), IGPX, Lazarus, Blue Exorcist, Get Jiro (2 ep.)		Lazarus episodes are English dubbed.
October 10, 2026	12 – 4 am	Get Jiro, Wind Breaker, One Piece (2 ep.), IGPX, Lazarus, Blue Exorcist, Get Jiro		Lazarus episodes are English dubbed.
October 17, 2026–November 28, 2026	12 – 4 am	Get Jiro, Wind Breaker, Gachiakuta, One Piece, IGPX, Lazarus, Blue Exorcist, Get Jiro	October 31: Three-hour Get Jiro marathon, followed by a two-hour Housing Complex C marathon, a Toonami interstitial, and the block closes with another two-hour Get Jiro marathon (9:30 PM - 4 AM, including Daylight Savings Time)	Lazarus episodes are English dubbed.
December 5, 2026–present	12 – 4 am	Wind Breaker, Gachiakuta, One Piece (2 ep.), IGPX, Lazarus, Blue Exorcist, Rooster Fighter		Lazarus episodes are English dubbed.

==== Toonami Rewind ====
Broadcast dates (Note: All broadcast dates shown are Friday.)	Time	Programs featured	Special programming	Notes and refs
May 31, 2024– July 12, 2024	5 – 7 pm	Sailor Moon, Dragon Ball Z Kai (2 ep.), Naruto		
July 19, 2024– December 27, 2024	5 – 7 pm	Sailor Moon (2 ep.), Naruto, Dragon Ball Z Kai	December 6–27: Dragon Ball Z Kai marathon	

=== Toonami special blocks ===
Some of the special blocks that have aired in Toonami during its run on Cartoon Network and Adult Swim:

- Toonami Lunar Eclipse (1999): Sailor Moon marathon.
- Toonami DBZ20XL (1999): a week of Dragon Ball Z episodes during Weekday Toonami.
- Toonami DBZ20XL Movie Marathon (1999): Dragon Ball Z: The Tree of Might, Dragon Ball Z: The World's Strongest, Dragon Ball Z: Dead Zone.
- DBZ President's Day Movie Marathon (2000): Dragon Ball Z: The Tree of Might, Dragon Ball Z: The World's Strongest, Dragon Ball Z: Dead Zone.
- New Year's Eve-il (2000, 2001): mostly Dragon Ball Z episodes.
- Midnight Run Special Edition (2001): aired music videos from Gorillaz, the first four segments of Daft Punk's Interstella 5555, and Mark Osborne's short film More synchronized to "Hell Bent" by Kenna.
- Zoids Cubed (2001): Zoids: New Century Zero episodes.
- Batman VS Superman (2002): alternating episodes from Batman: The Animated Series and Superman: The Animated Series.
- April Fools Joker Virus (2002): episodes from Batman: The Animated Series featuring The Joker.
- Naruto Years Eve (New Year's Eve 2005): Naruto marathon.
- A Month of Miyazaki (March 18-April 8, 2006): a month-long event featuring films directed by Hayao Miyazaki: Spirited Away, Princess Mononoke, Castle in the Sky and Nausicaä of the Valley of the Wind.
- Giant Robot Week (February 24–28, 2003)
- April Fools (2012): a run of Toonami-related shows on Adult Swim.
- April Fools (2018): a run of the majority of the already-scheduled anime lineup but subtitled with original Japanese audio. It also included an early showing of the first episode of the Japanese dub of FLCL Alternative and the film Mind Game, both with English subtitles.
- Toonami Rewind (2024): a run of some shows that were broadcast on Toonami's original line up, including the 90's version of Sailor Moon (Viz Dub), Dragon Ball Z Kai, and Naruto, only airing on Fridays in place of the "Checkered Past" block.

== See also ==
- List of programs broadcast by Cartoon Network
- List of programs broadcast by Cartoonito
- List of programs broadcast by Boomerang
- List of programs broadcast by Adult Swim
- List of programs broadcast by Discovery Family
