= List of programs broadcast by Adult Swim =

This is a list of television programs that have aired or are set to air on Cartoon Network's nighttime programming block Adult Swim in the United States. Although both entities share the same channel space and Cartoon Network is the main network, Adult Swim is officially classified as a separate network for Nielsen ratings purposes.

== Current programming ==
=== Animated ===
| Title | Premiere date | Note(s) |
|---|---|---|
| Robot Chicken | February 20, 2005 | |
| Off the Air | January 1, 2011 | |
| Rick and Morty | December 2, 2013 | |
| Adult Swim Smalls | October 30, 2018 | (Note: Web series with occasional airings on television) |
| Primal | October 8, 2019 | (Note: Also ran on Toonami in 2020, 2022–23 and 2026) |
| Common Side Effects | February 2, 2025 | (Note: Also runs on Toonami) |
| Haha, You Clowns | October 19, 2025 | |
| President Curtis | July 26, 2026 | |

==== Toonami block ====
| Title | Premiere date | Note(s) |
|---|---|---|
| My Adventures with Superman | July 7, 2023 | (Note: Starting with the second season, the series premiered on Toonami and encored on Adult Swim proper.) |
| Ninja Kamui | February 11, 2024 | |
| Get Jiro | October 4, 2026 | (Note: The series premieres on Toonami and encores on Adult Swim proper.) |

=== Live-action ===
| Title | Premiere date | Note(s) |
|---|---|---|
| The Terrors of Jordan Mendoza | September 13, 2026 | |

=== Acquired programming ===
| Title | Adult Swim premiere date | Note(s) |
|---|---|---|
| Family Guy | April 20, 2003 | (Note: Initially left Adult Swim on September 18, 2021, but later returned on January 1, 2025) |
| American Dad! | February 13, 2005 | |
| Bob's Burgers | June 23, 2013 | |
| Dragon Ball Z Kai ← | November 9, 2014 | (Note: The series is currently only airing on a regular Adult Swim timeslot outside the Toonami block.) |

- ← – Denotes Toonami program that also ran on Toonami Rewind (2024)

==== Toonami block ====
| Title | Adult Swim premiere date | Note(s) |
|---|---|---|
| One Piece | May 19, 2013 | |
| Blue Exorcist | February 23, 2014 | |
| Wind Breaker | October 11, 2026 | |
| Gachiakuta | October 18, 2026 | |

==== Cartoon Network programming / Checkered Past block ====
| Title | Adult Swim premiere date | Note(s) |
|---|---|---|
| IGPX | April 27, 2013 | (Note: Part of the Toonami block) |
| Samurai Jack (seasons 1–4) | August 16, 2014 | (Note: Has aired on the regular Adult Swim lineup and as part of both the Toonami and Checkered Past blocks.) |

== Upcoming programming ==
=== Original programming ===
| Title | Scheduled premiere date | Note(s) |
|---|---|---|
| Heist Brothers | TBA | |
| Keeping Up with the Joneses | TBA | |
| My Two Cars | TBA | |
| SuperMutant Magic Academy | TBA | |
| Untitled Adult Swim x AEW project | TBA | |

== Former original programming ==
=== Animated ===
| Title | Premiere date | Finale date(s) | Note(s) |
|---|---|---|---|
| Space Ghost Coast to Coast | September 2, 2001 | April 12, 2004 | (Note: Moved over from Cartoon Network) |
| Home Movies | September 2, 2001 | April 4, 2004 | (Note: The first five episodes originally aired on UPN in 1999) |
| The Brak Show | September 2, 2001 | December 31, 2003 | (Note: The original pilot episode first aired on Cartoon Network on December 21, 2000) |
| Sealab 2021 | September 2, 2001 | April 24, 2005 | (Note: The first three episodes first aired on Cartoon Network in 2000) |
| Harvey Birdman, Attorney at Law | September 2, 2001 | October 12, 2018 | |
| Aqua Teen Hunger Force (Note: Seasons 8-11 are also branded with different alternative titles. Season 8: Aqua Unit Patrol Squad 1, Season 9: Aqua Something You Know Whatever, Season 10: Aqua TV Show Show, Season 11: Aqua Teen Hunger Force Forever) | September 9, 2001 | December 17, 2023 | (Note: The first episode originally aired on Cartoon Network on December 30, 2000) (Note: Originally ended on August 30, 2015, but later returned for a new season on November 26, 2023) |
| The Big O II | January 23, 2003 | March 23, 2003 | |
| The Venture Bros. | February 16, 2003 | October 7, 2018 | |
| Stroker & Hoop | August 1, 2004 | December 25, 2005 | |
| Perfect Hair Forever | November 7, 2004 | April 1, 2014 | |
| Tom Goes to the Mayor | November 14, 2004 | September 25, 2006 | |
| 12 oz. Mouse | June 19, 2005 | July 31, 2020 | |
| Squidbillies | October 16, 2005 | December 13, 2021 | |
| Lucy, the Daughter of the Devil | October 30, 2005 | November 11, 2007 | |
| Minoriteam | November 6, 2005 | July 23, 2006 | |
| The Boondocks | November 6, 2005 | June 23, 2014 | |
| Moral Orel | December 13, 2005 | November 19, 2012 | |
| Metalocalypse | August 6, 2006 | October 27, 2013 | |
| Frisky Dingo | October 16, 2006 | March 23, 2008 | |
| Assy McGee | November 26, 2006 | July 6, 2008 | |
| The Drinky Crow Show | May 13, 2007 | January 25, 2009 | |
| Superjail! | May 13, 2007 | July 20, 2014 | |
| Xavier: Renegade Angel | November 4, 2007 | April 16, 2009 | |
| Titan Maximum | September 27, 2009 | November 22, 2009 | |
| Mary Shelley's Frankenhole | June 27, 2010 | March 25, 2012 | |
| Mongo Wrestling Alliance | January 23, 2011 | July 31, 2011 | |
| Soul Quest Overdrive | May 24, 2011 | | |
| China, IL | October 2, 2011 | June 14, 2015 | |
| Black Dynamite | July 15, 2012 | January 10, 2015 | |
| Mr. Pickles | August 25, 2013 | November 18, 2019 | |
| King Star King | June 15, 2014 | February 13, 2023 | |
| Mike Tyson Mysteries | October 27, 2014 | February 16, 2020 | |
| Brad Neely's Harg Nallin' Sclopio Peepio | July 10, 2016 | September 18, 2016 | |
| Apollo Gauntlet | December 4, 2016 | August 13, 2017 | |
| Hot Streets | December 4, 2016 | March 24, 2019 | |
| The Jellies! | October 22, 2017 | June 23, 2019 | |
| Tender Touches | December 18, 2017 | June 19, 2020 | |
| Final Space | February 26, 2018 | June 14, 2021 | (Note: Originally aired on TBS) |
| Ballmastrz: 9009 | April 9, 2018 | February 20, 2023 | |
| Tigtone | May 14, 2018 | October 12, 2020 | |
| The Shivering Truth | May 22, 2018 | June 14, 2020 | |
| Lazor Wulf | April 7, 2019 | January 11, 2021 | |
| Momma Named Me Sheriff | November 18, 2019 | March 15, 2021 | |
| JJ Villard's Fairy Tales | May 11, 2020 | June 15, 2020 | |
| YOLO | August 10, 2020 | April 28, 2025 | |
| Birdgirl | April 5, 2021 | July 17, 2022 | |
| Tuca & Bertie | June 13, 2021 | August 29, 2022 | (Note: The first season was first released on Netflix in 2019) |
| Teenage Euthanasia | September 6, 2021 | September 28, 2023 | |
| Smiling Friends | January 10, 2022 | April 12, 2026 | |
| Royal Crackers | April 2, 2023 | May 2, 2024 | (Note: The first episode was released on YouTube on March 19, 2023) |
| Unicorn: Warriors Eternal | May 5, 2023 | June 30, 2023 | |
| Rick and Morty: The Anime | August 16, 2024 | October 18, 2024 | (Note: Also ran in Japanese on Toonami) |
| Oh My God... Yes! (Note: Full title for the series is Oh My God... Yes! A Series of Extremely Relatable Circumstances) | March 10, 2025 | April 14, 2025 | |
| Women Wearing Shoulder Pads | August 17, 2025 | September 28, 2025 | |

=== Live-action ===
| Title | Premiere date | Finale date(s) | Note(s) |
|---|---|---|---|
| Saul of the Mole Men | February 11, 2007 | July 15, 2007 | |
| Tim and Eric Awesome Show, Great Job! | February 11, 2007 | August 27, 2017 | |
| Fat Guy Stuck in Internet | May 14, 2007 | August 17, 2008 | |
| Delocated | April 1, 2008 | March 7, 2013 | |
| The Rising Son | April 19, 2009 | May 10, 2009 | |
| Check It Out! with Dr. Steve Brule | May 16, 2010 | July 29, 2016 | |
| Childrens Hospital | July 10, 2010 | April 15, 2016 | |
| Your Pretty Face Is Going to Hell | January 20, 2011 | June 14, 2019 | |
| Eagleheart | February 3, 2011 | January 16, 2014 | |
| NTSF:SD:SUV:: | July 22, 2011 | December 13, 2013 | |
| The Heart, She Holler | November 6, 2011 | December 11, 2014 | |
| Loiter Squad | March 25, 2012 | July 17, 2014 | |
| The Eric Andre Show | May 20, 2012 | July 2, 2023 | |
| The Restless Bell | September 4, 2012 | September 7, 2012 | |
| You're Whole | November 5, 2012 | December 2, 2013 | |
| Newsreaders | January 17, 2013 | February 13, 2015 | |
| Hot Package | October 4, 2013 | March 27, 2015 | |
| Tim & Eric's Bedtime Stories | October 31, 2013 | October 1, 2017 | |
| Decker | July 17, 2014 | July 3, 2020 | |
| Black Jesus | August 7, 2014 | November 30, 2019 | |
| The Jack and Triumph Show | February 20, 2015 | April 3, 2015 | |
| Neon Joe, Werewolf Hunter | December 7, 2015 | May 26, 2017 | |
| Million Dollar Extreme Presents: World Peace | August 5, 2016 | September 16, 2016 | |
| Dream Corp LLC | October 23, 2016 | November 23, 2020 | |
| The Cry of Mann (Note: Miniseries) | October 23, 2017 | November 2, 2017 | |
| Williams Stream | March 13, 2017 | November 7, 2020 | |
| Joe Pera Talks with You | May 20, 2018 | December 13, 2021 | |
| Mostly 4 Millennials | July 2, 2018 | July 23, 2018 | |
| Tropical Cop Tales | July 29, 2018 | March 1, 2019 | |
| The Call of Warr | October 29, 2018 | November 2, 2018 | |
| Beef House | March 30, 2020 | May 4, 2020 | |
| Three Busy Debras | March 30, 2020 | May 23, 2022 | |

=== Toonami block ===
| Title | Premiere date | Finale date(s) | Note(s) |
|---|---|---|---|
| FLCL | August 5, 2003 | October 15, 2023 | |
| Space Dandy | January 4, 2014 | September 28, 2014 | |
| Samurai Jack | March 11, 2017 | May 20, 2017 | |
| Sand Whale and Me | March 19, 2017 | April 16, 2017 | |
| Gēmusetto | April 1, 2019 | December 21, 2020 | (Note: Second season of Gēmusetto; Premiered every episode except its last four on Toonami) |
| Fena: Pirate Princess | August 15, 2021 | October 24, 2021 | |
| Blade Runner: Black Lotus | November 14, 2021 | February 6, 2022 | |
| Shenmue: The Animation | February 6, 2022 | May 1, 2022 | |
| Housing Complex C | October 2, 2022 | October 23, 2022 | |
| Uzumaki | September 29, 2024 | October 20, 2024 | |
| Invincible Fight Girl | November 3, 2024 | December 22, 2024 | (Note: Premiered on Toonami and encored on regular Adult Swim every following Thursday) |
| Lazarus | April 6, 2025 | June 29, 2025 | |
| Rooster Fighter | March 14, 2026 | May 31, 2026 | |

== Former acquired programming ==
| Title | Original Adult Swim air dates | Note(s) |
|---|---|---|
| Astro Boy | 2007–08; April 1, 2012 | |
| Baby Blues | 2002–05; 2009–11 | (Note: Originally aired on The WB, the last five episodes from the first season made their original debuts on Adult Swim in 2002) |
| Blood+ | 2007–09 | |
| Blue Gender | 2003 | |
| Case Closed | 2004–05 | |
| Clerks: The Animated Series | 2008–10 | |
| The Cleveland Show | 2012–18 | |
| Code Geass: Lelouch of the Rebellion | 2008–09 | |
| Death Note | 2007–10 | |
| Durarara!! | 2011–12 | |
| Fullmetal Alchemist | 2004–10 | |
| Futurama | 2003–07; 2021–25 | (Note: Initial run from January 12, 2003, to December 31, 2007. Second run from December 27, 2021, to December 27, 2025.) |
| Garth Marenghi's Darkplace | 2007–11 | |
| The Gary Coleman Show | 2006 | |
| Gigantor | 2005–07; April 1, 2012 | |
| God, the Devil and Bob | 2011–12 | (Note: Originally aired on NBC, the last nine episodes made their original U.S. television debuts on Adult Swim in 2011) |
| Karate Kommandos | 2006 | |
| Kekkaishi | 2010–12 | |
| Kikaider | 2003 | |
| King of the Hill | 2009–18; 2021–25 | (Note: Initial run from January 1, 2009, to June 29, 2018. Second run from November 22, 2021, to November 22, 2025.) |
| Look Around You | 2009–11 | |
| Lupin the 3rd Part II | 2003–07 | |
| The Mighty Boosh | 2009–13 | |
| Mission Hill | 2002–06; 2008–09 | (Note: Originally aired on The WB, the last five episodes made their original debuts on Adult Swim in 2002) |
| Mr. T | 2006 | |
| Mobile Suit Gundam | 2002 | |
| Mobile Suit Gundam 0080: War in the Pocket | 2002 | |
| Mobile Suit Gundam 0083: Stardust Memory | 2002 | |
| Moribito: Guardian of the Spirit | 2008–09 | |
| Neon Genesis Evangelion | 2005–06 | |
| The Oblongs | 2002–13; 2015 | |
| The Office | 2009–11 | |
| Pee-wee's Playhouse | 2006–07 | |
| Pilot Candidate | 2002 | |
| The PJs | 2008–10 | |
| Psi Cops | 2024 | |
| Reign: The Conqueror | 2003–04 | |
| The Ripping Friends | 2002–04 | |
| Rocky and Bullwinkle | 2002 | |
| Saved by the Bell | 2006 | |
| s-CRY-ed | 2005–06 | |
| Shin-chan | 2006–09 | |
| Sit Down, Shut Up | 2014–15 | |
| The Smoking Gun | 2006–07 | |
| The Super Globetrotters | 2006 | |
| The Super Milk-Chan Show | 2004–06 | |
| SuperMansion | 2017–19 | |
| Ten Year Old Tom | 2023 | |
| Tenchi Muyo! | 2002; April 1, 2012 | |
| Tenchi Universe | 2002 | |
| Trigun | 2003–06; April 1, 2012 | |
| Trinity Blood | 2006–07 | |
| Unsupervised | 2015 | |
| Voltron | 2006–07 | |
| Witch Hunter Robin | 2004–05 | |
| Wolf's Rain | 2004–05 | |
| YuYu Hakusho | 2002–03; April 1, 2012 | |

=== Toonami block ===
| Title | Original Adult Swim air dates | Note(s) |
|---|---|---|
| Akame ga Kill! | 2015–16 | |
| Assassination Classroom | 2020–22 | |
| Attack on Titan | 2014–15; 2017–24 | |
| Beware the Batman | 2014 | |
| The Big O † | 2001; April 1, 2012; 2013–14 | |
| Black Clover | 2017–21 | |
| Black Lagoon | 2014 | |
| Bleach † | 2006–15 | |
| Bleach: Thousand-Year Blood War | 2025–26 | |
| Blue Lock | 2026 | |
| Boruto: Naruto Next Generations | 2018–19 | |
| Casshern Sins | 2012 | |
| Cowboy Bebop † | 2001–15; 2017–18; 2020; 2022 | |
| Dandadan | 2025–26 | |
| Deadman Wonderland | 2012; 2015 | |
| Demon Slayer: Kimetsu no Yaiba | 2019–21; 2023–24 | |
| Dimension W | 2016 | |
| Dr. Stone | 2019–24 | |
| Dragon Ball Daima | 2025–26 | (Note: The series additionally aired on a regular Adult Swim timeslot outside the Toonami block.) |
| Dragon Ball Super | 2017–21 | |
| Eureka Seven † | 2006–09; 2012–13 | |
| Fire Force | 2019–21 | |
| Food Wars!: Shokugeki no Soma | 2019–23 | |
| Fullmetal Alchemist: Brotherhood † | 2010–14 | |
| Gen:Lock | 2019 | |
| Ghost in the Shell: Stand Alone Complex † | 2004–18 | |
| Gurren Lagann | 2014–15 | |
| Harley Quinn | 2021 | |
| Hellsing Ultimate | 2014 | |
| Hunter × Hunter (2011) | 2016–19 | |
| Inuyasha † | 2002–14 | |
| Inuyasha: The Final Act | 2014–15 | |
| JoJo's Bizarre Adventure | 2016–17 | |
| JoJo's Bizarre Adventure: Stardust Crusaders | 2017–18 | |
| JoJo's Bizarre Adventure: Diamond Is Unbreakable | 2018–19 | |
| JoJo's Bizarre Adventure: Golden Wind | 2019–20 | |
| Kill la Kill | 2015–16 | |
| Lupin the 3rd Part IV: The Italian Adventure | 2017–18 | |
| Lupin the 3rd Part V: Misadventures in France | 2019 | |
| Lupin the 3rd Part 6 | 2022 | |
| Lycoris Recoil | 2024 | |
| Made in Abyss | 2022–23 | |
| Mashle: Magic and Muscles | 2024–26 | |
| Megalobox | 2018–19 | |
| Michiko & Hatchin | 2015 | |
| Mob Psycho 100 | 2018–20 | |
| Mobile Suit Gundam: Iron-Blooded Orphans | 2016–19 | |
| Mobile Suit Gundam Unicorn RE:0096 | 2017 | |
| Mobile Suit Gundam: The Origin – Advent of the Red Comet | 2019 | |
| My Hero Academia | 2018–24 | |
| Naruto ← | 2012–14; 2024–25 | |
| Naruto: Shippuden | 2014–24 | |
| One-Punch Man | 2016–20 | |
| Outlaw Star † | 2002; April 1, 2012; 2017–18 | |
| Paranoia Agent † | 2005–07; 2020 | |
| Parasyte -the maxim- | 2015–16 | |
| Pop Team Epic | 2018–19 | |
| The Promised Neverland | 2019–22 | |
| Sailor Moon (Viz Media dub) ← | 2024–25; 2026 | |
| Samurai 7 | 2012–13 | |
| Samurai Champloo † | 2005–08; 2016 | |
| Scavengers Reign | 2026 | |
| Soul Eater | 2013–14 | |
| SSSS.Gridman | 2021 | |
| Star Wars: The Clone Wars † | 2009; 2012–14 | |
| Sword Art Online | 2013–14 | |
| Sword Art Online II | 2015 | |
| Sword Art Online: Alicization | 2019–21 | |
| Tenchi Muyo! GXP | 2012–13 | |
| ThunderCats | 2012–13 | |
| Tokyo Ghoul | 2017 | |
| Tokyo Ghoul √A | 2017 | |
| Tokyo Revengers | 2026 | |
| Yashahime: Princess Half-Demon | 2021–23 | |
| Zom 100: Bucket List of the Dead | 2024; 2026 | |

- † – Denotes Toonami program that previously ran on Adult Swim Action/AcTN (2002–12)
- ← – Denotes Toonami program that also ran on Toonami Rewind (2024)

=== Cartoon Network programming / Checkered Past block ===
| Title | Original Adult Swim air dates | Source(s) |
|---|---|---|
| The Popeye Show | 2002; 2004–05 | |
| ToonHeads | 2005 | |
| Cartoon Planet | 2005; 2024–25 | (Note: Has aired on the regular Adult Swim lineup and as part of the Checkered Past block) |
| The Bob Clampett Show | 2005 | |
| Sym-Bionic Titan | 2012–13; 2014 | |
| Samurai Jack (seasons 1–4) | 2014–15; 2018–19; 2021; 2023–24; 2026 | |
| Adventure Time | 2019 | |
| Courage the Cowardly Dog | 2023–25; 2026 | (Note: Part of the Checkered Past block) |
| Dexter's Laboratory | 2023–25; 2025–26 | (Note: Part of the Checkered Past block) |
| Ed, Edd n Eddy | 2023–25; 2026 | (Note: Part of the Checkered Past block) |
| The Grim Adventures of Billy & Mandy | 2023–25; 2026 | (Note: Part of the Checkered Past block) |
| Grim & Evil | 2023 | (Note: Part of the Checkered Past block) |
| Cow and Chicken | 2023–24; 2026 | (Note: Part of the Checkered Past block) |
| Evil Con Carne | | (Note: Part of the Checkered Past block) |
| I Am Weasel | 2023–24 | (Note: Part of the Checkered Past block) |
| Johnny Bravo | 2024–25 | (Note: Part of the Checkered Past block) |
| What a Cartoon! | 2024–25 | (Note: Part of the Checkered Past block) |

=== Stunts and cross-promotional ===
| Title | Originally aired (on Adult Swim) | Description |
|---|---|---|
| Blue Submarine No. 6 | 2012 | Episode 1 aired as part of Adult Swim's 2012 Toonami April Fools' Day stunt. |
| Dragon Ball Z | 2012 | Episode 191 aired as part of Adult Swim's 2012 Toonami April Fools' Day stunt. |
| Full Frontal with Samantha Bee | 2016 | Talk show on TBS hosted by Samantha Bee. The series premiere was shown on Adult Swim on February 8, 2016, as part of a multi-network simulcast. |
| Jon Glaser Loves Gear | 2016 | TruTV comedy starring Jon Glaser. The series premiere was shown on Adult Swim on November 1 at midnight for promotional reasons. |
| Mobile Suit Gundam Wing | 2012 | Episode 10 aired as part of Adult Swim's 2012 Toonami April Fools' Day stunt. |
| Neighbors from Hell | 2010 | A TBS series. The first episode aired only twice on June 13, 2010, for promotional reasons. |
| Wrecked | 2016 | TBS comedy created by Jordan Shipley and Justin Shipley. The series premiere was shown on Adult Swim on June 17, 2016, to promote the series' run on TBS. |

== Original online programming ==
| Title | Originally aired | Note(s) |
|---|---|---|
| Adult Swim Celebrity Poker Tournament Royale | 2017 | |
| Adult Swim Summer Showdown | 2020 | |
| Alabama Jackson | 2022 | Spin-off of Robot Chicken |
| Aquadonk Side Pieces | 2022 | Spin-off of Aqua Teen Hunger Force |
| Assembly Line, Yeah! | 2016–20 | |
| As Seen on Adult Swim | 2017–20 | |
| Big Unhappy Family | 2019 | Fan show for On Cinema |
| Block or Charge | 2019–20 | |
| Bloodfeast | 2015–20 | Formerly known as Crossword, Dave and the Crossword Guys, and Community Puzzle Help Em Out |
| Bloodfeast Presents | 2018–20 | Spin-off of Bloodfeast |
| Bottom Text | 2019–20 | |
| Carl's Cold Stone Lock of the Century of the Week | 2007–16 | Also aired on SVP & Russillo and SportsCenter at Night |
| Daytime Fighting League | 2016–17 | |
| Dear Jono | 2017–20 | |
| Desperate Losers | 2018–20 | |
| Development Meeting | 2016–20 | |
| Digikiss | 2018–20 | Also known as Quarantine Valentine during the COVID-19 pandemic |
| Electronic Game Information | 2018–20 | |
| Fan Fiction Showdown | 2020 | |
| FishCenter Live | 2014–20 | |
| Game Humpers | 2015–20 | |
| How to Draw | 2017–20 | |
| I Love David | 2019 | For the Channel 5 stream |
| I'm Dr. Rich, or Am I? | 2018–20 | |
| Karaoke Dokie | 2018–20 | |
| Last Stream on the Left | 2016–20 | Moved to the Last Podcast on the Left YouTube account |
| On Cinema at the Cinema | 2012–20 | Moved to HEI Network, an independent subscription service |
| Our Bodies | 2019 | For the Channel 5 stream |
| The Perfect Women | 2018–20 | Formerly Roast Me, Mommies; Moved to YouTube |
| Pregame Prognostifications from the Pigskin Wyzzard | 2017–18 | Successor to Carl's Cold Stone Lock of the Century of the Week |
| Ricking Morty | 2017 | |
| SCUM | 2019 | For the Channel 5 stream |
| The Sports Hole | 2016–20 | Formerly Sports Bitches |
| Stupid Morning Bullshit | 2015–20 | |
| Tato Chat | 2018–20 | |
| Tim and Eric Qu?z | 2019 | For the Channel 5 stream |
| Toonami Audience Takeover Bracket | 2020 | |
| Toonami Pre-Flight | 2015–20 | |
| Traveling Tuesdays | 2020 | Spin-off of Williams Street Swap Shop |
| The Trial | 2017 | Spin-off of On Cinema |
| Truthpoint | 2019–20 | |
| Vindicators 2 | 2022 | Spin-off of Rick and Morty |
| The Weather | 2019–20 | |
| Williams Street Swap Shop | 2015–20 | |
| The Wonder Closet | 2018–20 | Formerly Friday Fix |
| Your Pretty Face Is Going to Hell: The Cartoon | 2022 | Continuation of Your Pretty Face Is Going to Hell |

== Pilots and specials ==
=== Pilots ===
| Title | Originally aired | Description |
|---|---|---|
| Art Prison | 2018 | Aired on July 29, 2018. |
| Bad Guys | 2016 | Aired on December 4, 2016. |
| Captain Sturdy: The Originals | 2003 | Produced by Renegade Animation. Sequel/rework to a Cartoon Network 2001 pilot (Captain Sturdy: "Back in Action!") originally aimed at children. Rejected by Adult Swim. |
| Cheyenne Cinnamon and the Fantabulous Unicorn of Sugar Town Candy Fudge | 2010 | Features the voices of Neko Case and MC Chris. The pilot aired on March 29, 2010, as the winner of an online popularity contest sponsored by Burger King. It was not picked up as a series. |
| Chuck Deuce | 2018 | Aired on May 13, 2018. |
| Di Bibl | 2019 | Aired on April 22, 2019. |
| Duckworth | 2011 | Live-action pilot created by Dave Willis and Matt Harrigan (co-creator of Assy McGee and Perfect Hair Forever) starring Matt Berry, Dana Snyder, Jason Mantzoukas, and Bill Raymond. Pilot aired on Adult Swim's DVR Theater on January 18, 2011. |
| Eggland | 2022 | Produced in 2022. Pilot uploaded to the Adult Swim's YouTube channel on August 3, 2024. |
| The Finkel Files | 2002 | Produced by FlickerLab and aired in 2002; rejected by Cartoon Network. |
| Filthy Sexy Teen$ | 2013 | Live action pilot created by Paul Scheer, Jonathan Stern, and Curtis Gwinn. Produced by Abominable Pictures and Scheer's company 2nd Man On The Moon. Premiered on October 10, 2013. Later picked up by online service Fullscreen. |
| Gigglefudge, USA! | 2016 | Aired April 11, 2016. |
| The Groovenians | 2002 | Created by Kenny Scharf and produced by Cartoon Network Studios. Rejected due to extremely negative reviews from critics and audiences. |
| The Hindenburg Explodes! | 2016 | Live-action comedy centering on the Hindenburg disaster. Created by Rob Corddry, Josh Perilo, and Jonathan Stern. Aired December 2, 2016. |
| Hunky Boys Go Ding-Dong | 2018 | Created by Todd Rohal and produced by PFFR. Aired on December 4, 2018. |
| Korgoth of Barbaria | 2006 | Created by Aaron Springer and produced by Cartoon Network Studios. Animation was directed by Genndy Tartakovsky of . It premiered June 4, 2006. Two more storyboards were ordered, but the series was not greenlit due to financial reasons. Aired as daylight saving time filler during Toonami. |
| Let's Fish | 2007 | Created by Mark Rivers. Starring Scott Adsit and Brendon Small. Pilot rejected by Adult Swim. |
| The Lewis Lectures | 2002 | Created by Merrill Markoe and produced by Soup2Nuts. Starring Jack Black as a Tony Robbins-esque dog. Pilot rejected by Cartoon Network in 2000 and was not picked up by Adult Swim. |
| Macbeth with Dinosaurs | 2021 | Pilot uploaded to the Adult Swim's YouTube channel on September 9, 2021. Aired on Adult Swim on February 1, 2023. |
| The Mark Lembeck Technique | 2016 | Live action comedy starring Jason Alexander. Aired December 2, 2016. |
| Mystery Cuddlers | 2024 | Created by Pendleton Ward and Jack Pendarvis. It aired on November 19, 2024 at 4:00 am. Pilot was uploaded to the Adult Swim's YouTube channel on the same day. |
| Neon Knome | 2008 | Created by Ben Jones and produced by PFFR. Moved to Cartoon Network due to Adult Swim executives thinking it was too "mind-blowingly cute" for the block and reworked into The Problem Solverz, with Cartoon Network Studios and Mirari Films producing the series. |
| Ole Bud's ANU Football Weekly | 2018 | Aired on October 22, 2018. |
| Paid Programming | 2009 | The pilot aired as a "special" unannounced on November 3, 2009, then re-aired every Tuesday-Thursday until December 3, 2009. It was not picked up for a full series, as confirmed when creator, H. Jon Benjamin, called it an "abject failure". |
| Penguins Behind Bars | 2003 | Created by Janet Perlman and produced by Hulascope Studio. Aired once on July 20, 2003 and rejected by Adult Swim; did not receive acknowledgement until it was uploaded onto the Adult Swim website. |
| Pibby | 2021 | Created by Dodge Greenley and produced by Cartoon Network Studios. Concept trailer uploaded to the Adult Swim YouTube channel on October 30, 2021. The trailer received widespread popularity online and the concept would be expanded on during Adult Swim's April Fools 2022 broadcast. On October 3, 2023, Greenley announced Pibby would not be moving forward as a series. On April 26, 2024, Dodge Greenley uploaded parts of a storyboard for a Pibby pilot to his website, providing fans a glimpse into what had been developed. The storyboard was removed from the website the following day. The full animatic of the pilot was leaked online on June 30, 2024. |
| The Pound Hole | 2015 | 15 minute short set to introduce the pilot on April 20, 2015. |
| Saddle Rash | 2002 | Created by Loren Bouchard and produced by FlickerLab. It was rejected by Adult Swim. |
| Snake 'n' Bacon | 2009 | The pilot first aired May 10, 2009. It was entered in a Burger King popularity contest to be aired in March and then re-evaluated for a series run, but was not successful. |
| Southies | 2011 | Animated comedy about a family in South Boston. Created by Carl W. Adams who worked on Dr. Katz, Home Movies, and Assy McGee. Pilot aired on Adult Swim's DVR Theater on January 19, 2011. |
| Stiff | 2007 | Live-action special from Matt Maiellaro, it aired on Adult Swim on October 31, 2007. |
| That Crook'd 'Sipp | 2007 | Created by Nick Weidenfeld, Jacob Escobedo, and Mike Weiss and starring David Banner. Pilot aired on May 13, 2007. The show idea was scrapped and later produced into the hour-long special Freaknik: The Musical, which first aired on March 7, 2010. |
| Totally for Teens | 2011 | Pilot from Derrick Beckles (TV Carnage, Street Carnage) and Sabrina Saccoccio, and executively produced by Vernon Chatman (PFFR, Wonder Showzen, Xavier: Renegade Angel), and Ari Fishman from The Daily Show. Pilot aired on Adult Swim's DVR Theater on January 20, 2011. |
| Trap Universe | 2018 | Created by JJ Villard, who created King Star King and later JJ Villard's Fairy Tales, and produced by Titmouse, Inc. for Adult Swim. Aired on May 13, 2018. |
| Übermansion | 2013 | Animated pilot by Zeb Wells and Matthew Senreich. Produced by Stoopid Buddy Stoodios and Stoop!d Monkey. The pilot was released online on July 22, 2013, as part of a vote to decide whether or not it will air on August 26. The pilot won and aired on television on August 26, 2013. Later picked up by online service Crackle and retitled SuperMansion. |
| Welcome to Eltingville | 2002 | Created by Evan Dorkin and produced by Cartoon Network Studios. An adaptation of Dorkin's Eisner Award-winning comic book Dork!. |
| Yenor | 2023 | Created by Matt Maiellaro. Aired on February 1, 2023. |

=== Original specials ===
For special programming released under the "Infomercials" banner, please see Infomercials.

| Title | Originally aired | Description |
|---|---|---|
| The Adult Swim Golf Classic: Daly vs. Scott | 2016 | Aired April 8, 2016. Extended 72-minute version was available at Adult Swim's website. |
| Adult Swim Yule Log (also known as The Fireplace) | 2022 | Aired on December 11, 2022. |
| Adult Swim Yule Log 2: Branching Out | 2024 | Aired on December 6, 2024. |
| Ambient Swim: Vintertog | 2023 | Aired on March 31, 2023. |
| Anime Talk Show | 2004 | Space Ghost interviews Meatwad from Aqua Teen Hunger Force, Sharko from Sealab 2021, and Early Cuyler from Squidbillies. It aired as a response to the pilot episode of Perfect Hair Forever, which unexpectedly preempted the Squidbillies pilot. |
| Bagboy | 2015 | Aired February 20, 2015. |
| Ballmastrz: Rubicon | 2023 | Aired on February 20, 2023. Sequel to Ballmastrz: 9009. |
| Beforel Orel: Trust | 2012 | Aired on November 18, 2012; announced after a Mary Shelley's Frankenhole marathon. Prequel to Moral Orel. |
| Brett Gelman's Dinner in America | 2016 | Aired July 1, 2016. Final Brett Gelman special. |
| Bushworld Adventures | 2018 | 11-minute animated parody of Rick and Morty from Michael Cusack. Aired unannounced on April 1, 2018. |
| Christmas in December | 2009–10 | A Christmas infomercial parody, featuring a compilation of mini-infomercials marketing merchandise in the Adult Swim shop. |
| Dinner with Family with Brett Gelman and Brett Gelman's Family | 2015 | Aired February 20, 2015. |
| Dinner with Friends with Brett Gelman and Friends | 2014 | Live-action 30-minute special parodying Dinner for Five. Aired April 24, 2014. |
| Earth Ghost | 2011 | Aired on April 1, 2011, as part of an April Fools' Day prank. It is a version of the Lowe Country pilot that was released online in May 2007. In this version George Lowe is replaced by a poorly animated CGI Space Ghost along with all of the people that he interacted with replaced with poorly animated CGI stand-ins of themselves. |
| The Elephant | 2025 | Aired on December 19, 2025. |
| Freaknik: The Musical | 2010 | A 60-minute special starring T-Pain, Rick Ross, Lil' Wayne, Andy Samberg, and numerous other special guests. This was originally planned as a series titled That Crook'd 'Sipp, but the series plan was scrapped and changed into an hour-long special, which first aired March 7, 2010. |
| The Greatest Event in Television History | 2012–14 | Each episode aired periodically by itself as a series of specials. Creator Adam Scott confirmed that it has ended. |
| Harvey Birdman: Attorney General | 2018 | Aired on October 15, 2018. Sequel to Harvey Birdman, Attorney at Law. |
| Infomercials | 2009–present | 15-minute American television comedy specials that lampoon the infomercial format as well as other graveyard slot programming. |
| Joe Pera Helps You Find the Perfect Christmas Tree | 2016 | Aired on December 9, 2016. |
| King Star King!/!/!/ | 2023 | Aired on February 13, 2023. Sequel to King Star King. |
| KRFT Punk's Political Party | 2019 | Aired on March 8, 2019. |
| Mother, May I Dance with Mary Jane's Fist? | 2018 | Forty-five minute special from Mary Elizabeth Ellis and Artemis Pebdani. Based on a play of the same name. Aired January 7, 2018, at midnight. |
| Metalocalypse: The Doom Star Requiem | 2013 | One-hour rock opera special from the Adult Swim series Metalocalypse. Aired on October 27, 2013. |
| Mr. Neighbor's House | 2016–18 | Created by Brian Huskey, Jason Mantzoukas, and Jesse Falcon. Parody of children's shows such as Mister Rogers' Neighborhood. Two specials produced. |
| Scavengers | 2016 | Aired December 24, 2016. |
| Smalls | 2018–present | A series of shorts from a wide variety of creators. Various shorts, including May I Please Enter?, Shop: A Pop Opera, Wet City, Jamir at Home, and Jack Stauber's OPAL, have aired on TV as specials. Other shorts have been released exclusively to Adult Swim's website and/or Adult Swim's YouTube channel. |
| Scott Pilgrim vs. The Animation | 2010 | 5-minute animated short produced by Titmouse, Inc. made to promote Scott Pilgrim vs. the World. Aired August 12, 2010, in two parts during commercial breaks. |
| Soft Focus | 2018—19 | Created by Jena Friedman. The first special aired on February 18, 2018, and the second aired on January 25, 2019. |
| Too Many Cooks | 2014 | Surreal dark comedy short created, written, and directed by Casper Kelly that became a viral video online. |
| Toonami: Countdown Supercut | 2018 | Special editing the Toonami: Countdown interstitials together into a full narrative. Aired April 7, 2018. |
| The Xtacles | 2008 | Spin-off special of Frisky Dingo. Only two episodes were produced. They both aired together on November 9, 2008. An animated short bridging the gap between the show and Frisky Dingo was produced as a special feature on the season 2 DVD of Frisky Dingo on January 6, 2009. |
| Young Person's Guide to History | 2008 | A two-part special from the creators of Saul of the Mole Men. |

=== Syndicated shorts and specials ===
| Title | Originally aired | Description |
|---|---|---|
| A Day in the Life of Ranger Smith | 2002 | Created by John Kricfalusi and produced by Spümcø. Originally aired on Cartoon Network in 1999 as part of The Cartoon Cartoons Show. Based on Ranger Smith. |
| The Animation Show | 2005 | Animated shorts from The Animation Show 2003. Featured Billy's Balloon, Intermission, and Mike's Pencil Test. Aired in November 2005. |
| Batman: Strange Days | 2014 | Animated short created for Batman's 75th anniversary. Originally broadcast on Cartoon Network as part of DC Nation. Aired May 10, 2014, during a commercial break of a Beware the Batman episode. |
| Batman Beyond | 2014 | Animated short created for Batman's 75th anniversary. Originally broadcast on Cartoon Network as part of DC Nation. Aired August 2, 2014, during a commercial break of a Beware the Batman episode. Not to be confused with the television series of the same name. |
| Blade Runner Black Out 2022 | 2021 | An anime short film based on the Blade Runner franchise. Aired November 26, 2021, on Toonami's special Friday night broadcast. |
| Boo Boo Runs Wild | 2002 | Created by John Kricfalusi and produced by Spümcø. Originally aired on Cartoon Network in 1999 as part of The Cartoon Cartoons Show. Based on Yogi Bear. |
| Kakurenbo: Hide and Seek | 2005 | Japanese animated short centering around demonic themes. Aired October 31, 2005. |
| Kick-Heart | 2013 | Animated short by Production I.G. Aired August 31, 2013, on Toonami. Aired for a third time as daylight saving time filler on November 2, 2013. |
| Night of the Living Doo | 2002 | A Scooby-Doo television special written by Casper Kelly and Jeff Olson for Cartoon Network. Sequel to The Scooby-Doo Project. |
| Shelter: The Animation | 2016 | Japanese animated music video. Aired December 31, 2016, on Toonami. |
| The Jetsons: Father and Son Day | 2002 | Flash animated short made by Spümcø based on The Jetsons. |
| The Jetsons: The Best Son | 2002 | Flash animated short made by Spümcø based on The Jetsons. |

== Films ==
| Title | Originally aired | Description |
|---|---|---|
| Akira | 2013 | 1988 animated film based on the manga series of the same name. Premiered December 7, 2013, on Toonami. |
| Aqua Teen Hunger Force Colon Movie Film for Theaters | 2008 | An original Adult Swim feature film based on Aqua Teen Hunger Force, and was the first film adaptation of an Adult Swim series. It was released in theaters on April 13, 2007. The film made its official television debut on March 31, 2008, on Adult Swim. |
| Aqua Teen Forever: Plantasm | 2023 | An original Adult Swim film. First released direct-to-video on November 8, 2022, and later Max on February 8, 2023. It later premiered on television on March 19, 2023. |
| Batman: Gotham Knight | 2020 | Premiered August 22, 2020, on Toonami. |
| Batman: Hush | 2022 | Premiered September 17, 2022, on Toonami. |
| Batman: Mask of the Phantasm | 2022 | Premiered September 17, 2022, on Toonami. |
| Batman: The Dark Knight Returns Part 1 | 2020 | Premiered August 15, 2020, on Toonami. |
| Batman: The Dark Knight Returns Part 2 | 2020 | Premiered August 22, 2020, on Toonami. |
| Batman: The Long Halloween | 2021 | Premiered October 23, 2021, on Toonami. Parts 1 and 2 aired together. |
| Batman: Under the Red Hood | 2021 | Premiered October 16, 2021, on Toonami. |
| Batman: Year One | 2020 | Premiered August 15, 2020, on Toonami. |
| Batman Ninja | 2021 | Premiered October 16, 2021, on Toonami. |
| Black Dynamite | 2012 | 2009 live-action film that inspired the Adult Swim animated series. Aired on September 2, 2012. |
| Blade Runner 2049 | 2021 | 2017 live-action blockbuster film and sequel to the 1982 Blade Runner film. Aired November 26, 2021, on Toonami's special Friday night broadcast. |
| Bleach: Memories of Nobody | 2009 | Aired on September 5, 2009. |
| Bleach: The DiamondDust Rebellion | 2009 | Aired on December 5, 2009. First anime film to air on Adult Swim in high definition. |
| Children Who Chase Lost Voices | 2016 | 2011 animated film directed by Makoto Shinkai. Premiered November 5, 2016, on Toonami. |
| Cowboy Bebop: The Movie | 2005 | Premiered September 3, 2005. A theatrical Cowboy Bebop movie based on the TV show. Also known as Cowboy Bebop: Knockin' on Heaven's Door. |
| Dragon Ball Z: Broly – The Legendary Super Saiyan | 2014 | 1993 animated film based on the Dragon Ball Z anime series. Premiered December 21, 2014, on Toonami. |
| Dragon Ball Z: Cooler's Revenge | 2014 | 1991 animated film based on the Dragon Ball Z anime series. Premiered May 24, 2014, on Toonami. |
| Escaflowne: The Movie | 2005 | Premiered September 10, 2005. |
| Evangelion 1.11 You Are (Not) Alone | 2013 | 2007 animated film remake of the Neon Genesis Evangelion TV series. Premiered March 17, 2013. The first film broadcast on Toonami since its revival in 2012; Funimation dub. |
| Evangelion 2.22 You Can (Not) Advance | 2013 | 2009 animated film remake of the Neon Genesis Evangelion TV series. Sequel to Evangelion 1.11. Premiered August 31, 2013, on Toonami; Funimation dub. |
| Fullmetal Alchemist the Movie: Conqueror of Shamballa | 2013 | 2005 animated film sequel of the original 2003 Fullmetal Alchemist anime series. Premiered December 21, 2013, on Toonami. |
| Fullmetal Alchemist: The Sacred Star of Milos | 2014 | 2011 animated film based on the Fullmetal Alchemist: Brotherhood anime series. Premiered December 14, 2014, on Toonami. |
| G.I. Joe: Resolute | 2009 | A feature film version of the shorts that aired on April 25, 2009. |
| Injustice | 2023 | Premiered February 19, 2023, on Toonami. |
| Inuyasha the Movie: Affections Touching Across Time | 2005 | Premiered May 21, 2005. The first theatrical Inuyasha movie. Also known as Inuyasha: The Love that Transcends Time. |
| Inuyasha the Movie: The Castle Beyond the Looking Glass | 2005 | Premiered August 28, 2005. |
| Inuyasha the Movie: Swords of an Honorable Ruler | 2006 | Premiered August 12, 2006. |
| Inuyasha the Movie: Fire on the Mystic Island | 2006 | Premiered December 23, 2006. |
| Justice League: The New Frontier | 2020 | Premiered December 19, 2020, on Toonami. |
| Justice League vs. the Fatal Five | 2023 | Premiered February 26, 2023, on Toonami. |
| Metropolis | 2005 | Premiered May 14, 2005. Theatrical film based on the manga by Osamu Tezuka and the 1927 film of the same name. |
| Mind Game | 2018 | 2004 animated film written and directed by Masaaki Yuasa. Premiered April 1, 2018. Presented in its original Japanese language audio with English subtitles on Toonami as part of an April Fools' stunt. |
| Mobile Suit Gundam: Char's Counterattack | 2003 | Premiered January 4, 2003. Theatrical film based on the Mobile Suit Gundam series. The last program aired on Adult Swim Action's Saturday schedule before it was renewed in 2004. |
| Read or Die | 2004 | Three-episode OVA prequel to the Read or Die series that premiered on October 23, 2004. Aired as a single feature with credits at the end. |
| Summer Wars | 2013 | 2009 animated film by director Mamoru Hosoda. Premiered December 14, 2013, on Toonami. |
| The Animatrix | 2004, 2021 | Premiered April 17, 2004. Series of Japanese and American animated shorts based on The Matrix films. Premiered December 18, 2021, on Toonami to promote The Matrix Resurrections. |
| The Room | 2009 | First aired on April 1, 2009, as part of an April Fools' Day prank. In 2010 it aired again on April Fools' Day; featuring Space Ghost interviewing Tommy Wiseau in the same format as Space Ghost Coast to Coast as bumps. The movie aired again on April 1, 2011, for the third year in a row. On April 1, 2012, part of the opening was aired, before cutting to T.O.M. from Toonami, opening an announced night of the block. |
| Trigun: Badlands Rumble | 2013 | 2010 animated film set in the same universe as the 1998 Trigun anime series. Premiered December 28, 2013, on Toonami. |
| Wonder Woman: Bloodlines | 2020 | Premiered December 19, 2020, on Toonami. |

== See also ==
- List of programs broadcast by Cartoon Network
- List of programs broadcast by Cartoonito
- List of programs broadcast by Toonami
- List of programs broadcast by Boomerang
- List of programs broadcast by Discovery Family
