= Radical Axis (studio) =

American animation studio

Radical Axis, Inc.
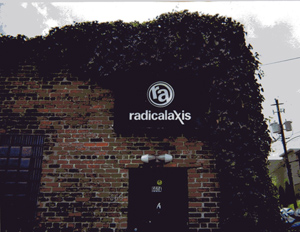
- The studio exterior in Atlanta in 2010
- Type: Private
- Industry: Film, television animation and commercials
- Founded: 2000; 26 years ago
- Founder: Scott Fry
- Defunct: September 30, 2021; 5 years ago
- Fate: Dissolved by SOS
- Headquarters: Atlanta, Georgia, U.S.
- Key people: Scott Fry, Craig Hartin, Todd Redner, April Pesa, Brandon Betts
- Products: Aqua Teen Hunger Force; Squidbillies; Cheyenne Cinnamon; 12 oz. Mouse; Perfect Hair Forever; Sealab 2021; Archer
- Number of employees: 11 to 50
- Website: radicalaxis.com

Radical Axis, Inc. (stylized as radicalaxis) was an American animation studio headquartered in Atlanta, Georgia. It is known for providing animation services to adult animated television shows and commercials. The studio's television credits include Aqua Teen Hunger Force, Squidbillies, Cheyenne Cinnamon, 12 oz. Mouse, Perfect Hair Forever, Sealab 2021 on Adult Swim, Freak Show on Comedy Central, and Archer on FX, and its feature film credits include Aqua Teen Hunger Force Colon Movie Film For Theaters.

== Overview ==
Radical Axis was founded in 2000 by Scott Fry, who became an animator on the series Aqua Teen Hunger Force.

"Rhett Danielson" (played by writer/comedian Nick Gibbons) interviews studio CEO, Scott Fry in Radical Axis Presents Radical Axis Presents.

Specializing in animation and design for episodic and commercial projects, the studio also provides turnkey production services that include the creation, execution, and delivery of broadcast ready content. For Freak Show, Radical Axis handled all aspects of production, from initial audio records, designs and storyboards to the final delivery of the master.

The studio was profiled in a 1940s-style mockumentary short, "Radical Axis Presents Radical Axis Presents", that appeared as a Special Feature on the Aqua Teen Hunger Force Volume 6 DVD. Radical Axis has also been praised by comedian and Freak Show creator/writer, David Cross, who said, "Radical Axis is to animation what the Gutenberg Bible is to publishing. In short, one of the most significant, groundbreaking inventions in history that will move us forward and out of these dark ages. That, and they're funny too."

In addition to its work in episodic television, the studio has also provided animation, motion graphics, and design services for hundreds of commercial projects for companies such as Chuck E. Cheese, Earthlink, Cheetos, and L'Oreal.

On 30 September 2021, Radical Axis, Inc. was officially dissolved by the Georgia Secretary of State. The company's website is defunct and its principal office at 666 9th Street Northwest in Atlanta is unoccupied.

== Growth ==
The studio had offices in Studio City, California and Bangkok, Thailand. Operating out of a storage closet at Cartoon Network's Williams Street facility for two years from its inception, Radical Axis moved into a 2,800-square-foot (260 m^{2}) studio in Midtown Atlanta, before expanding again to over 6,000 square feet.

== Production ==
In 2005, Radical Axis averaged a completed commercial project every four days and a television program every three weeks.

According to an interview with Radical Axis' Scott Fry, Craig Hartin, Todd Redner and Aqua Teen Hunger Force co-creator, Matt Maiellaro, animation files and drawings are often downloaded from FTP sites and approved via email or instant messenger.

== Projects ==
- 12 oz. Mouse
- A Priest, A Rabbi and A Minister Walk Into a Bar - Crackle.com comedy starring Adam Carolla, Larry Miller and Lenny Clarke
- Aqua Teen Hunger Force
- Aqua Teen Hunger Force Colon Movie Film for Theaters
- Archer
- The Brak Show - additional animation.
- Robot Chicken
- Cherry Bomb
- Cheyenne Cinnamon - pilot starring Neko Case that was included in the Adult Swim in a Box DVD collection and aired on Adult Swim on March 29, 2010, after winning an online vote
- Commercial Projects for TNT, L'Oreal, Wal-Mart, Campbell's Soup, Kellogg's and Turner Broadcasting
- Freak Show
- Perfect Hair Forever
- Sealab 2021
- Soul Quest Overdrive - David Cross, H. Jon Benjamin, and Kristen Schaal spin-off of the "Bible Fruit" episode of Aqua Teen Hunger Force
- Squidbillies
- Stiff - Radical Axis provided visual effects and the title sequence animation for this live-action horror homage created by Matt Maiellaro
- Window Seat - a Comedy Central.com web series co-created and produced by Radical Axis featuring "a put-upon business traveler and the various weirdos who sit next to him on the plane." Animated in the style of airplane safety pamphlets, this original series was named a "must see" by Time Out New York.
