= Six Myths about the Good Life =

Six Myths about the Good Life: Thinking about what has Value is a popular philosophical book by Joel J. Kupperman of the University of Connecticut. Its primary focus is on what has value, and which values are most worth espousing in life — a question central to what is known as the philosophy of life.

While some philosophers have come to see the pursuit of happiness as central to the making of a good life, others point to the value of achievement. Kupperman sees grounds for both conceptions, but finds them wanting in simple and general terms. Drawing on classical Chinese, Indian, Greek and Roman sources, Six Myths explores this and in the process gives its readership a general impression of what Kupperman believes a good life ought to be. The "broader theme", according to reviewer and Rhodes University philosopher Samantha Vice, "is an exploration of particular values and their role in making a life desirable." Kupperman seeks also to debunk the apparently widely held notion that a simple account suffices.

== The myths ==
1. "Pursuing Comfort and Pleasure Will Lead to the Best Possible Life".
2. "The Desirable Life Equals the One That Is Most Happy".
3. "The Good Life Requires Reaching a Good Equilibrium, a Point at Which the Important Difficulties Are Resolved".
4. "Reason Rather Than Emotions Would Be the Best Indicator of What Would Be a Good Life".
5. "There Is No Real Connection, At Least in This Life, Between True Virtue and a Desirable Kind of Life".
6. "True Virtue is Impeccable".

There is also a seventh chapter, entitled "How Can We Know What Has Value?", and an appendix addressing ensuant concerns.

== Critical reception ==
"This," declared Boston University's Philip J. Ivanhoe, "is the best introduction to philosophical accounts of the good life available. An excellent choice for any student of philosophy, this original and revealing study will inform, stimulate, and challenge even the most sophisticated reader. Kupperman combines the distinctive care, precision, and analytic power of philosophy with the best insights of contemporary psychology and a sophisticated, sensitive, and wise appreciation of the Indian, Chinese, and Western philosophical traditions. The result is a modern classic."

Charles Guignon of the University of South Florida was similarly impressed:

Six Myths is a consistently clear and engaging book, in the same league as Bertrand Russell's classic work, The Conquest of Happiness [...]. The author's grasp of Eastern thought and the "positive psychology" movement makes the book useful to a very wide audience.

== Bibliography ==
- Kupperman, Joel J. Six Myths about the Good Life: Thinking about what has Value. Indianapolis: Hackett, 2006.
- Vice, Samantha. "Joel K. Kupperman - Six Myths about the Good Life: Thinking About What Has Value - Reviewed by Samantha Vice, Rhodes University." Notre Dame Philosophical Reviews. 16 August 2006. (accessed June 10, 2009).
