= Korgoth of Barbaria =

2006 American adult animated television pilot

- Genre: Black comedy Action; Splatter
- Created by: Aaron Springer
- Written by: Aaron Springer
- Directed by: Aaron Springer; Genndy Tartakovsky (animation)
- Voices of: Diedrich Bader; Corey Burton; John DiMaggio; Tom Kenny; Craig T. Raisner; Susan Spano
- Narrated by: Corey Burton
- Composer: Lee Holdridge
- Country of origin: United States
- Original language: English
- No. of episodes: 1

Production
- Executive producers: Aaron Springer; Brian A. Miller (Note: For Cartoon Network Studios.); Mike Lazzo (Note: For Williams Street.); Keith Crofford; Nick Weidenfeld
- Running time: 22 minutes
- Production companies: Cartoon Network Studios; Williams Street

Original release
- Network: Adult Swim
- Release: June 4, 2006

Korgoth of Barbaria is an American adult animated television pilot created by Aaron Springer for Cartoon Network's nighttime programming block Adult Swim. Produced by Cartoon Network Studios, it was the first production by the studio to be co-produced by Williams Street. It aired on June 4, 2006, and was picked up, but was cancelled by the network for high production costs.

== Production ==
The series creator, Aaron Springer, is a storyboard artist, writer and director for Dexter's Laboratory, The Grim Adventures of Billy & Mandy, Samurai Jack, and SpongeBob SquarePants, who previously created another failed pilot at Cartoon Network Studios called Periwinkle Around the World. He would later go on to produce Billy Dilley's Super-Duper Subterranean Summer for Disney XD. Genndy Tartakovsky, creator of Dexter's Laboratory and Samurai Jack, directed the animation for the pilot. This was not the only time he worked on a pilot created by Springer, as Tartakovsky also produced and directed Periwinkle Around the World. Animation services was provided by Rough Draft Korea.

At Comic-Con 2006, the show was scheduled to release sometime in spring of 2007. As of December 29, 2007, the only mention of the show on the Adult Swim website was an intro graphic with the words "You couldn't handle more than one anyway."

== Airing ==
The series was first aired in the United States on June 4, 2006, at 12:30 AM (EST) on Adult Swim. On June 18, Adult Swim ran a bumper announcing that Korgoth of Barbaria was officially picked up as a series, because of its critical and commercial success with garnering high ratings. Later events, including a formal petition to revive the show and an Adult Swim bumper announcement mentioning its cancellation, indicate that it was dropped before production began due to high production costs.

Adult Swim re-aired the pilot episode on the night of October 31, 2008, as part of an advertised "Halloween Stunt" night, where rarely seen programs such as Welcome to Eltingville and Boo Boo Runs Wild were aired, rather than the usual programming line-up for a Friday evening.

In November 2010, Adult Swim ran a bumper listing shows that were not picked up and brief reasons why. Korgoth was listed with the explanation as "too expensive".

Adult Swim re-aired the pilot (teased as a "surprise") on November 3, 2013, as a part of their Toonami block.

Adult Swim re-aired the pilot again on January 29, 2019.

== Episode ==
=== Summary ===
From the Adult Swim website:

In a dark future wasteland, the great cities have risen and fallen, primordial beasts have reclaimed the wilderness and thieves and savages populate sparse, dirty towns. From the frozen north emerges a warrior known as Korgoth, and his merciless savagery may be his only key to survival.

Korgoth of Barbaria followed the exploits of the eponymous Korgoth (voiced by actor Diedrich Bader), and parodied Conan the Barbarian, as well as the sword and sorcery subgenre in general. The show was set in a post-apocalyptic world where sorcery and the remnants of technology exist simultaneously. The theme song in the style of thrash metal was composed by Lee Holdridge.

=== Plot ===
Korgoth is infected with a deadly parasite by Gog-Ma-Gogg and extorted to steal an item known as "The Golden Goblin of the Fourth Age" from the wizard Specules, who Gog believes to have recently died. He journeys with a group of Gog-Ma-Gogg's henchmen to Specules' castle, picking up a girl and killing several things along the way. The group reaches the castle and begin to plunder it. As Korgoth searches for the Golden Goblin, Specules returns, explaining that he was on vacation. Specules uses his magic to kill or incapacitate all but Korgoth, who proves too strong for the ridiculous creatures that the wizard conjures through chewing gum. As a last resort, Specules uses his magic directly against Korgoth, only to be knocked off-balance and accidentally kill Korgoth's girl. Angered, Korgoth takes a two-pronged candle stick holder and impales Specules through the eyes, only to find that the wizard has magically transferred his head onto the dead girl's body. Specules proceeds to fly out the window. Korgoth returns to Gog-Ma-Gogg with the Golden Goblin (a simple novelty item) and gets the elixir for the deadly parasite, though the elixir takes many seasons to take effect. Korgoth is last seen walking away, pulling a cart full of medicine bottles.

== Voice cast ==
The main character, Korgoth

- Diedrich Bader as Korgoth, Henchman #1
- Corey Burton as Specules, Narrator, Doorman, Henchman #2
- Craig T. Raisner as Gog-Ma-Gogg, Bargrot
- John DiMaggio as Stink, Scrotus, Henchman #4
- Tom Kenny as Hargon, Henchman #3
- Susan Spano as Orala

== Home media ==
Warner Home Video released Adult Swim in a Box in October 2009, a DVD box set of a variety of Adult Swim shows. Korgoth of Barbaria was featured on this box set on a special DVD along with Welcome to Eltingville, the pilot episode of Perfect Hair Forever, Totally for Teens, and Cheyenne Cinnamon and the Fantabulous Unicorn of Sugar Town Candy Fudge. In June 2010, the bonus DVD from "Adult Swim in a Box" was made available for separate purchase on (the now defunct) Adultswimshop.com.
