= Craig Raisner =

American voice actor

- Adult Swim promotional shot
- Born: April 15, 1961
- Died: March 2, 2018 (aged 56); Rochester, NY

Craig T. Raisner (April 15, 1961 - March 2, 2018) was a voice actor, composer, writer and film/television producer. He was a native of Toledo, Ohio, known primarily for playing Gog-Ma-Gogg in Cartoon Network's Adult Swim animated series Korgoth of Barbaria.

== Career ==
Raisner was a comedian trained at The Second City and was a reluctant stand-up comedian in the Hollywood area. He had several on-screen credits, such as Louis in the underground classic film Le Petomane: Parti Avec le Vent. As a voice-over actor, he worked in the regional commercial market. He had credits as a Stage Manager in New York and with the Broadway show Jellyroll. He was a composer and pianist and had credits accompanying or conducting over 40 Broadway shows. He was also a writer and freelance producer in television and motion pictures.

== Personal life and death ==
He attended Maumee Valley Country Day School in Toledo, Ohio. While attending Boston University College of Fine Arts, Raisner was in the same class as actor Michael Chiklis.

On June 18, 2017, Craig Raisner was in a serious car accident in Fairport, NY. Despite several back operations, he remained paralyzed from the chest down. He died on March 2, 2018, at Strong Hospital in Rochester, New York of complications of blood infection and heart surgery.
