= Joel J. Kupperman =

American philosopher (1936–2020)

- Born: Joel Jay Kupperman; May 18, 1936; Chicago, Illinois, US
- Died: April 8, 2020 (aged 83); Brooklyn, New York City, US
- Education: University of Chicago; University of Cambridge
- Occupation: Professor of philosophy
- Known for: Quiz Kids
- Notable work: Six Myths about the Good Life
- Spouse: Karen Ordahl Kupperman
- Children: Michael Kupperman; Charlie Kupperman

Joel Jay Kupperman (May 18, 1936 – April 8, 2020) was an American professor of philosophy at the University of Connecticut and author of Six Myths about the Good Life, a popular philosophical volume centering on those values most worth engaging in human life. He was best known to the general public as a young math expert on the radio and television show Quiz Kids. Kupperman astounded audiences with his ability to do complex mathematics rapidly and seemingly "in his head." He also had strong general knowledge, and was often the winner of the weekly competitions featured on the show. The 1944 film Chip Off the Old Block, starring Donald O'Connor, Peggy Ryan and Ann Blyth, featured Kupperman as the "Quiz Kid", representative of the group.

During his initial Quiz Kids shows, Kupperman, who was then seven, lisped, which emphasized his youth and endeared him to the listening audience. In one episode of Quiz Kids, Joel showed his ability to multiply any number times 99 "in his head." When asked how he was able to do this, Kupperman replied "It's a theequit twick." When asked what the "secret trick" was, he explained that he merely multiplied the number he was given by 100, then subtracted the original number from that total to get the correct answer.

Kupperman received his bachelor's and master's degrees at the University of Chicago, where he enrolled at age 16. Due to his fame as a Quiz Kids prodigy, Kupperman was bullied by other students. He developed an interest in Asian philosophy, through which he found a mentor: a visiting professor who advised him to leave the United States. Kupperman migrated to England, where he enrolled in the University of Cambridge, earning a Ph.D. in Philosophy. Kupperman started teaching at the University of Connecticut in 1960 and was made a full professor in 1972.

Kupperman was married to noted historian/author Karen Ordahl Kupperman, who taught at New York University. They had two children: Michael Joel Kupperman, a noted cartoonist; and Charlie Anders Kupperman, a medical journalist and editor for Eli Healthcare. Kupperman was Jewish.

In 2018, Simon & Schuster published All the Answers, a graphic memoir by Michael Kupperman on his father Joel's rise to fame and his subsequent retreat from public life.

Kupperman died from complications of COVID-19 in Brooklyn, New York, on April 8, 2020. He was 83 years old.
