= Derrick Beckles =

Canadian television host

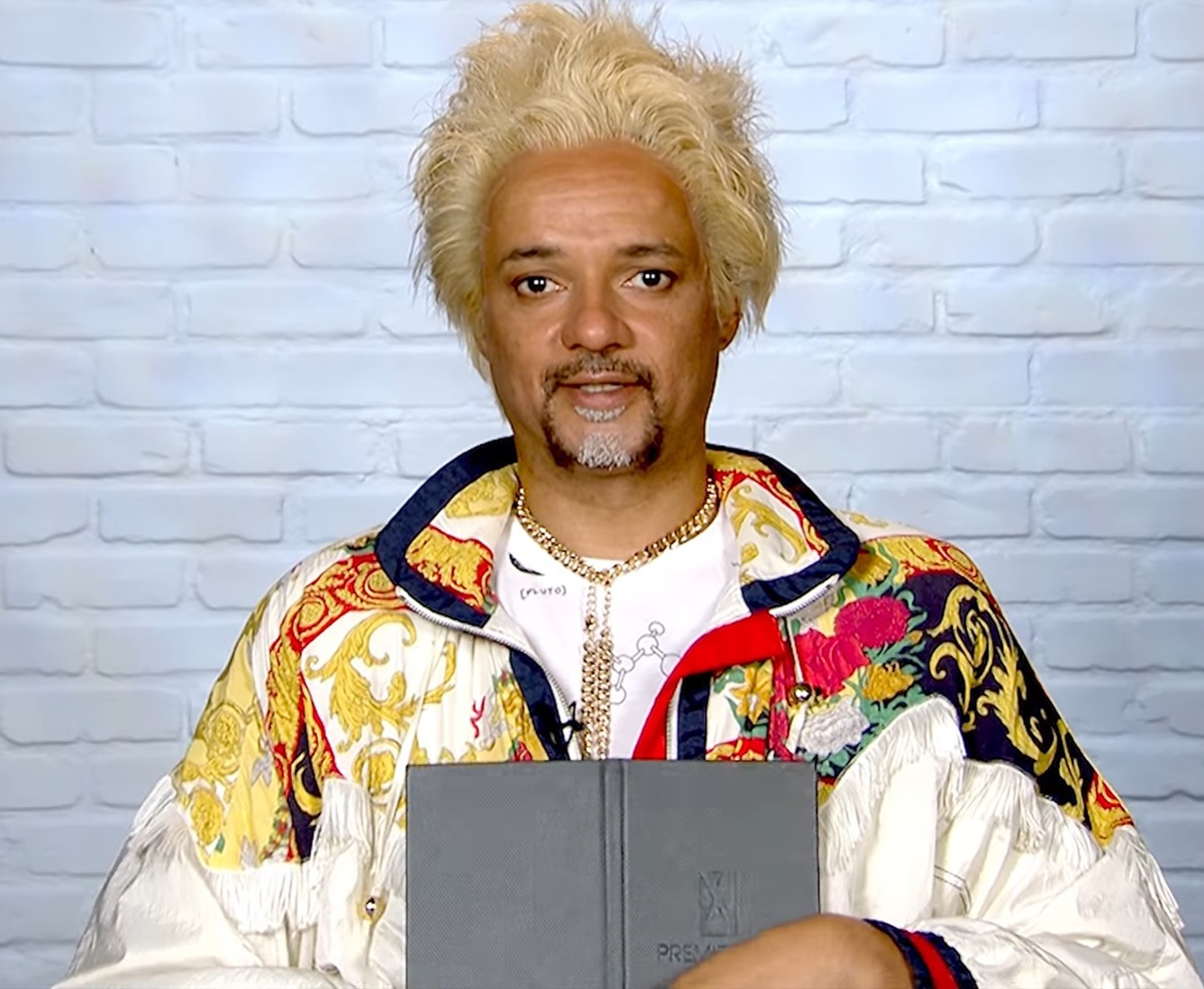
Beckles discusses Mostly 4 Millennials in 2018

Derrick Beckles is a Canadian writer, director, actor, punk rock singer and comedian from Scarborough, Ontario. He is the creator and host of the Adult Swim television show Hot Package, creator of the "TV Carnage" compilations, and helped found Vice TV. He also hosted the Adult Swim show Mostly 4 Millennials, after starting off fronting the Toronto band Black Jello.

== TV Carnage ==
Beckles recognized the appeal of poor programming in 1994 when he began releasing VHS mashups of spray-on hair infomercials, squirrel cooking shows, and public access freaks performing like no one’s watching. These compilations led to the creation of TV Carnage, a bootleg home-video series in which Beckles distills all the strangest clips from late-night infomercials, local-access programs and found videos, into hour-long DVDs.

While Beckles had been editing together Tex Avery cartoons with The Stooges songs to entertain his friends while in high school, the TV Carnage format didn't evolve into its current form until 1996. While bedridden and doped up on painkillers, Beckles began to assemble mashups with themes. In these mashups, Beckles treats well-known and unknown footage alike, sewing the scenes and moments together to create an absurd alternate entertainment universe.

A self-described, "slutty distributor of heavenly crap", Beckles calls the creation of TV Carnage his "way of screaming at the world". Though the compilations' original format was VHS, Beckles soon began producing DVDs. The format allowed for a wider audience and soon TV Carnage began to gain a cult following. Michael Cera has claimed, "TV Carnage is some of the most brilliant stuff out there right now."

TV Carnage DVDs include:

- Ouch Television My Brain Hurts
- A Rich Tradition of Magic
- When Television Attacks
- Casual Fridays
- A Sore For Sighted Eyes
- Let's Work It Out!

Beckles hosted many of the premieres for the TV Carnage DVDs at porn theatres in Toronto.

== Vice TV ==
After being a writer for Canadian publication Vice, Beckles worked with Johnny Knoxville and David Cross to develop Vice TV.

== Totally for Teens ==
Beckles developed a pilot in 2009 for Adult Swim called Totally for Teens with Sabrina Saccoccio. The program was designed to be a "mock teen show directly inspired by TRL, Christian programming and the Reagan-era 'Just Say No' campaign PSAs." On the show, the audience is taught "questionable life lessons from its morally bankrupt host." The pilot was never picked up but eventually aired on Adult Swim's DVR Theater on January 19, 2011.

== Music videos ==
Beckles has directed music videos for various recording artists that include Melissa Auf der Maur, Crystal Castles, Electric Six, and Islands. The video for Islands' song "No You Don't" stars Michael Cera.

The list of videos include:

- Uncut – "Understanding the New Violence" – 2006
- Crystal Castles – "Vanished" – 2008
- Electric Six – "Randy's Hot Tonight" – 2008
- White Williams – "New Violence" – 2008 Selected as one of the Top Videos of the Year by Pitchfork
- Tobacco – "Motor Licker" – 2010
- Islands – "No You Don't"- 2010
- Dirty Ghosts – "Ropes" – 2012
- HEALTH – "L.A. Looks" – 2016
- Neon Indian - "Techno Clique" - 2016
- Off! - "Holier than Thou" - 2021 Beckles didn't direct, however, he did act in the video playing the role of Rock Jesus

== See also ==
- Mostly 4 Millennials (2018)
