= Soul Quest Overdrive =

- From left to right: Mick, Mortimer, Bert, and Tammy.
- Created by: Dave Willis; Matt Maiellaro
- Voices of: Kristen Schaal; H. Jon Benjamin; David Cross; Gavin McInnes
- Country of origin: United States
- Original language: English
- No. of seasons: 1
- No. of episodes: 7 (2 unaired + unaired pilot)

Production
- Executive producers: Matt Maiellaro; Dave Willis; Keith Crofford; Mike Lazzo
- Producers: Nick Ingkatanuwat; John Brestan
- Editors: John Brestan; Lear Bunda; Nick Ingkatanuwat
- Running time: 4–5 minutes
- Production companies: Williams Street; Radical Axis

Original release
- Network: Adult Swim
- Release: May 24, 2011

Related
- Aqua Teen Hunger Force

Soul Quest Overdrive is an American adult animated television series that aired on Cartoon Network's late night programming block, Adult Swim. Soul Quest Overdrive is a spin-off of the Adult Swim series Aqua Teen Hunger Force. It was created by Aqua Teen Hunger Force creators Matt Maiellaro and Dave Willis. It made its formal debut and ended on May 24, 2011, leaving two episodes unaired. The series serves as a more adult parody of VeggieTales, and is about the misadventures of four anthropomorphic pieces of sports equipment.

== Premise ==
The series is about the misadventures of four anthropomorphic pieces of sports equipment: Mick, Mortimer, Bert, and Tammy, who live together in a mobile home. Despite being Evangelical Christians, they are also hedonistic drug addicts prone to extremely impulsive and destructive behavior.

== Characters ==
- Bert (David Cross) – an impulsive bowling pin.
- Mortimer (H. Jon Benjamin) – a baseball glove who seems more grounded than the rest of the group.
- Tammy (Kristen Schaal) – an abused basketball.
- Mick (Gavin McInnes) – a wild energetic Scottish soccer ball.

== Production ==
Soul Quest Overdrive was created by Matt Maiellaro and Dave Willis. It was picked up for six episodes in 2010.

The series is a spin-off of the Adult Swim series Aqua Teen Hunger Force, which was also created by Maiellaro and Willis. The characters originated as one-time characters from the Aqua Teen Hunger Force season five episode "Bible Fruit", which originally aired on March 23, 2008. "Bible Fruit" was created as a dark parody of VeggieTales, and features the main characters from Soul Quest Overdrive (with the exception of Mick) in the form of anthropomorphic fruits. The fruit characters from "Bible Fruit" were changed to pieces of anthropomorphic sports equipment in Soul Quest Overdrive, but maintained similar personalities and their original names. In "Bible Fruit" the fruit versions of the characters were voiced by the same voice actors who would go on to voice their respective sports equipment counterparts in Soul Quest Overdrive.

The character Mick does not appear in the pilot episode and did not have a counterpart in "Bible Fruit". Gavin McInnes, who provided the voice of Mick, was personally approached by Adult Swim and asked to play the voice of Mick, who has a thick Scottish accent on the show (McInnes himself is Canadian, of Glaswegian ancestry, but does not speak with a Scottish accent in real life).

== Broadcast history ==
"Meals on Wheels" was originally released online in early 2010, as part of a pilot contest in which viewers could watch several different pilots and vote on which would be best to air. It ultimately lost to the pilot of Cheyenne Cinnamon and the Fantabulous Unicorn of Sugar Town Candy Fudge, which aired on March 29, 2010. Although Cheyenne Cinnamon won the contest, it was never picked up for a full series, unlike Soul Quest Overdrive.

Three episodes from the first season originally premiered in Adult Swim's "DVR Theater" on May 24, 2011, alongside the television debut of "Meals on Wheels". No further episodes have been released following the show's debut on May 24, 2011, although the original still-unaired pilot has been made available online. Two episodes were never aired or released to the public in any format.

== Episodes ==
=== Pilot (2009) ===
Title	Written by	Original release date
"Pilot"	Nick Ingkatanuwat, John Brestan, Matt Maiellaro, and Dave Willis	Unaired
Bert runs over a man while driving erratically. Guest appearances: S. Scott Bullock as Injured man, and Paul Reubens as Tiger Jesus.

=== Season 1 (2011) ===
No.	Title	Written by	Original release date
1	"Adoption"	Nick Ingkatanuwat, John Brestan, Matt Maiellaro, and Dave Willis	May 24, 2011
The team adopts a baby monster. Guest appearances: Mary Craft as a woman, and Adam Reed as a social worker.
2	"Meals on Wheels"	Nick Ingkatanuwat, John Brestan, Matt Maiellaro, and Dave Willis	Early 2010 (online); May 24, 2011 (television)
The team helps bring food to the elderly though the Meals on Wheels program.
3	"Golf"	Nick Ingkatanuwat, John Brestan, Matt Maiellaro, and Lear Bunda	May 24, 2011
The team is taken to a planet of robot ex-wives. Guest appearances: John DiMaggio as a rich divorcee, and Anessa Ramsey as a robot ex-wife.
4	"Spaghetti"	Nick Ingkatanuwat, John Brestan, and Matt Maiellaro	May 24, 2011
The team is terrorized by spaghetti alien.
5	N/A	N/A	Unaired
6	N/A	N/A	Unaired

== See Also ==
- VeggieTales - the franchise that this show acts as a parody of.
- Moral Orel - another Adult Swim show that parodies another popular Christian show, that being Davey and Goliath.
