= Adult Swim in a Box =

DVD box set

- Box Art of the DVD
- Production company: Williams Street
- Distributed by: Warner Home Video
- Release date: October 27, 2009

Adult Swim in a Box is a seven-disc DVD box set produced by Williams Street and released by Warner Home Video on October 27, 2009. The box set contains various seasonal volume releases from Adult Swim series, as well as several pilots that were pitched to the network. The box set was first announced by Warner Home Video on July 31, 2009, to be released in October of the same year. The set was promoted as having a roughly threefold value, totaling 21 hours and 20 minutes of content.

An Australian version of Adult Swim in a Box was released in 2011. Critical reception for Adult Swim in a Box was mixed, with some reviewers confused as to the selection of content or recommending fans who have already purchased the shows on the set passing on it.

== Release ==
Adult Swim in a Box was first announced by Warner Home Video on July 31, 2009, to be released on October 27 of the same year. The set was promoted as having a roughly threefold retail value (US$180 or $160 to $69.98), containing "4 of the 5 best selling Adult Swim series." It consists of seven discs, totaling 21 hours and 20 minutes of content. According to the network's now-defunct online shopping site, the set was chosen to harken to the experience of purchasing an entire album "because you knew you liked at least one song."

== Contents ==
=== Series ===
- The 2nd volume of Aqua Teen Hunger Force
- The 3rd volume of Space Ghost Coast to Coast
- The uncensored 1st volume of Moral Orel
- The uncensored 2nd season of Robot Chicken
- The 1st season of Metalocalypse
- The 2nd season of Sealab 2021

=== Pilots ===
The following pilots are contained on one disc:

- Totally for Teens
- Cheyenne Cinnamon and the Fantabulous Unicorn of Sugar Town Candy Fudge
- Korgoth of Barbaria
- Welcome to Eltingville
- The 1st episode of Perfect Hair Forever

== Australian release ==
A Region 4 version of Adult Swim in a Box released on October 19, 2011. The contents of the Australian release differ from the region 1 release; while still having the pilots DVD and Moral Orel, the 1st volume of Space Ghost: Coast to Coast, Aqua Teen Hunger Force, and the 1st season of Sealab 2021 are used instead of later volumes. Robot Chicken and Metalocalypse are not included, and are replaced with the 1st season of Frisky Dingo, and the 1st volume of Squidbillies and The Brak Show.

Further collections of Adult Swim shows were released by Madman Entertainment for the Australian market. The Adult Swim Meat Tray Collection consists of six discs containing every episode of Lucy, the Daughter of the Devil, 12 oz. Mouse (at the time of its release) and Tom Goes to the Mayor. The set was released on November 28, 2012. The Adult Swim Grab Bag Collection, released on the same day, includes every episode of Titan Maximum, Minoriteam, Assy McGee, and Xavier: Renegade Angel.

== Critical reception ==
The box set received mixed critical reception; R.L. Shaffer of IGN was critical in his review of it, calling the release was "a complete waste" and the bonus disc "roughly 80 minutes of mediocre entertainment". He recommended fans purchase "the shows you like instead, and start in the proper place, with the first season." He ultimately gave the release an eight out of ten, however, stating "while this set is certainly well rated" in its content, he could not "find a reason to recommend it". Noel Murray of The A.V. Club expressed confusion over the selection of material, suggesting to the network to release a "straight-up Adult Swim best-of set with rarities". DVD Verdict's Mac McEntire felt the set was not "good enough to warrant you re-buying them all", should buyers already own all six season volume releases. He gave the release an 85 out of 100, remarking the pilots as showing "just how tough it must be to create a pilot, one that not only introduces characters and settings, but also promises a potential for weeks and perhaps years of additional stories."

DVD Talk's Casey Burchby called the release "sloppy", stating that fans who already owned DVD releases from their favorite programming on the network "can safely skip the release", though the set "does fairly represent the insanely creative, off-the-wall nature of the network." Jeff Niesel of the Cleveland Scene found the physical build of the set "a bit flimsy, but that's to be expected for such an affordably priced set." The Austin Chronicle's James Renovitch dubbed the release "the anti-box-set" that keeps "with the spirit of Adult Swim", while John Scott Lewinski of Wired called it "a sort of survival kit" for desperate fans of the network. Writing for Filter, Erik Nowlan rated it 90 percent, ensuring fans of Adult Swim will be "in pig heaven" upon its release. Nick Zaino of AOL TV praised the inclusion of Sealab 2021 and Metalocalypse, but called the pilots disc "a mixed bag, but mostly good." PopMatters' W. Scott Poole felt that the selection of series was "odd", stating that while the series included "belong in any selection of Adult Swim bests", so did others, naming The Venture Bros. and Harvey Birdman, Attorney at Law as deserving candidates that were not included.
