= Totally for Teens =

- Also known as: The Best of Totally for Teens; Totally 4 Teens
- Genre: Variety; Sketch comedy; Satire; Parody
- Created by: Derrick Beckles; Sabrina Saccoccio
- Written by: Derrick Beckles
- Directed by: Chris Grismer
- Starring: Derrick Beckles; Leo Fitzpatrick
- Composers: Nick Thorburn; Ethan Kath; Sam Muglia; Jason Bartell
- Country of origin: United States
- Original language: English

Production
- Executive producers: Derrick Beckles; Ari Fishman; Vernon Chatman
- Producers: Ari Fishman; Derrick Beckles
- Cinematography: John Rosenblatt; Ari Haberberg
- Editors: Derrick Beckles; Mike LaHaie
- Running time: 12 minutes approx.
- Production companies: TV Carnage; Williams Street

Original release
- Network: Adult Swim
- Release: January 19, 2011

Totally for Teens (also known as The Best of Totally for Teens or Totally 4 Teens) is an American failed television pilot created by Derrick Beckles and Sabrina Saccoccio for Cartoon Network's late night programing block, Adult Swim. It eventually aired on Adult Swim's "DVR theater" on January 19, 2011.

== Production ==
Filmed in Brooklyn, New York, the pilot episode for Totally for Teens was written and produced by Derrick Beckles, who also starred in it. Produced alongside Ari Fishman (former The Daily Show producer from 2000 to 2005) and directed by Chris Grismer, Totally for Teens ran for approximately 12 minutes, and was released on January 6, 2009. Comedy Central showed interest in the show and several actors were interested in working with him if it were to be picked up. Totally for Teens has had regular screenings at Street Carnage's "Monster Island", and Derrick has played it on comedy tours.

Totally for Teens’ format later served as the basis for Beckles’ future Adult Swim show, Mostly 4 Millennials.

== Summary ==
Described as a low-quality, live-action retro after school show, Totally for Teens is a parody of shows marketed for the teen demographic, which utilizes "teen lingo" and "teen styled" wardrobes.

In an interview with the Tea Party Boston, Beckles himself describes the Totally for Teens and his role in it as being "this teen show that never existed; basically I’m trying to give these teens the worst set of ethics and morals possible." The show features several clips from various vintage footage, one of which is a rap duo Riff Raff, who perform a song "D-I-S-E-A-S-E", which is about practicing safety against the contraction of AIDS in front of their classroom as part of an assignment, from a 1987 educational film. Sketch comedy and man-on-the-street segments are also featured. It also stars Leo Fitzpatrick as a cross dressing drug dealer, named "Mookie". Derrick is shown holding a lit cigarette, despite his opposition in real life as part of the Truth.com campaign, and in show as he attempts to dissuade a teenage boy against smoking. Street Carnage itself has called Totally for Teens a "warped teen show meets hyperactive video editing meets equal parts obnoxiousness and genius".

== Cast ==
Name	Character(s)
Derrick Beckles	Himself
Leo Fitzpatrick	Mookie
Ted Shumaker	Announcer
Marlee Roberts	Christian Teen

== Pilot episode ==
Title	Original release date	Prod. code
"Pilot"	January 19, 2011	101
The show begins with advertisements from "Drastic Pickles", which are pickles marketed for teens. Host Derrick appears in front of an audience of children, and begins by announcing what will precede over the course of the recording, which includes a performance by Good Charlotte. His first guest is the teen pop sensation Teen Insecurity, a girl modeled after the pop princess archetype. Upon interview, Teen Insecurity's negative perception of herself manifests into a floating flaming head. It features a skit with the 1991 Miss Teenage North America Pageant contestants, who act out buying and using drugs in an effort to inform the teens of potential death by "drugacide". This leads to one contestant to becoming ill, and forces the other girls to seek out "good drugs" to fight off the effects of "bad drugs" by contacting their friend Mookie, who promptly leaves. Later in the show, Derrick confronts a teenager interested in smoking by revealing to him the kind of person he would become by choosing to smoke or not to, and the teenager embarks on a existential journey with both of his future selves. The pilot ends with the fictional quadriplegic musician Broken Promises' song playing over the credits.

== Release ==
Totally for Teens was released on DVD as part of Adult Swim in a Box on October 29, 2009, on an extra DVD of Adult Swim pilots, along with Cheyenne Cinnamon and the Fantabulous Unicorn of Sugar Town Candy Fudge, Korgoth of Barbaria, Welcome to Eltingville, and the pilot episode of Perfect Hair Forever. The pilots DVD was re-released alone in June 2010.

== Sources ==
- Hatcher, RA; Hughes, MS (November–December 1988). "The truth about condoms". SIECUS Report. 17 (1–8). U.S. National Library of Medicine. ISSN 0091-3995. OCLC 112602410.
