= Ward Jones =

South African philosopher

Ward E. Jones is a scholar at Rhodes University in Grahamstown, South Africa, where he is a professor of philosophy. He joined the department in 1999.

His DPhil. thesis, The View from Here: A First-Person Constraint on Believing, was completed in 1998 at Oxford University. While finishing his thesis, Jones spent three years teaching philosophy at various colleges in Oxford.

Jones has published in the areas of epistemology, ethics, philosophy of mind, aesthetics, and metaphilosophy.

With a 1997 paper, "Why Do We Value Knowledge?", published in American Philosophical Quarterly, he won regard as one of the early contributors to the nascent debate on the Meno problem. In collaboration with Samantha Vice, he has edited and contributed to Ethics at the Cinema, which was published by Oxford University Press in 2010.

Turning to metaphilosophy in 2013, he completed a short manuscript, Dissensus and the Value of Philosophy, on the value of philosophy to the non-philosopher. It is currently under consideration at publishers.

He is currently co-editor of Philosophical Papers, published by Routledge.
