= Michael Kupperman =

American cartoonist and illustrator

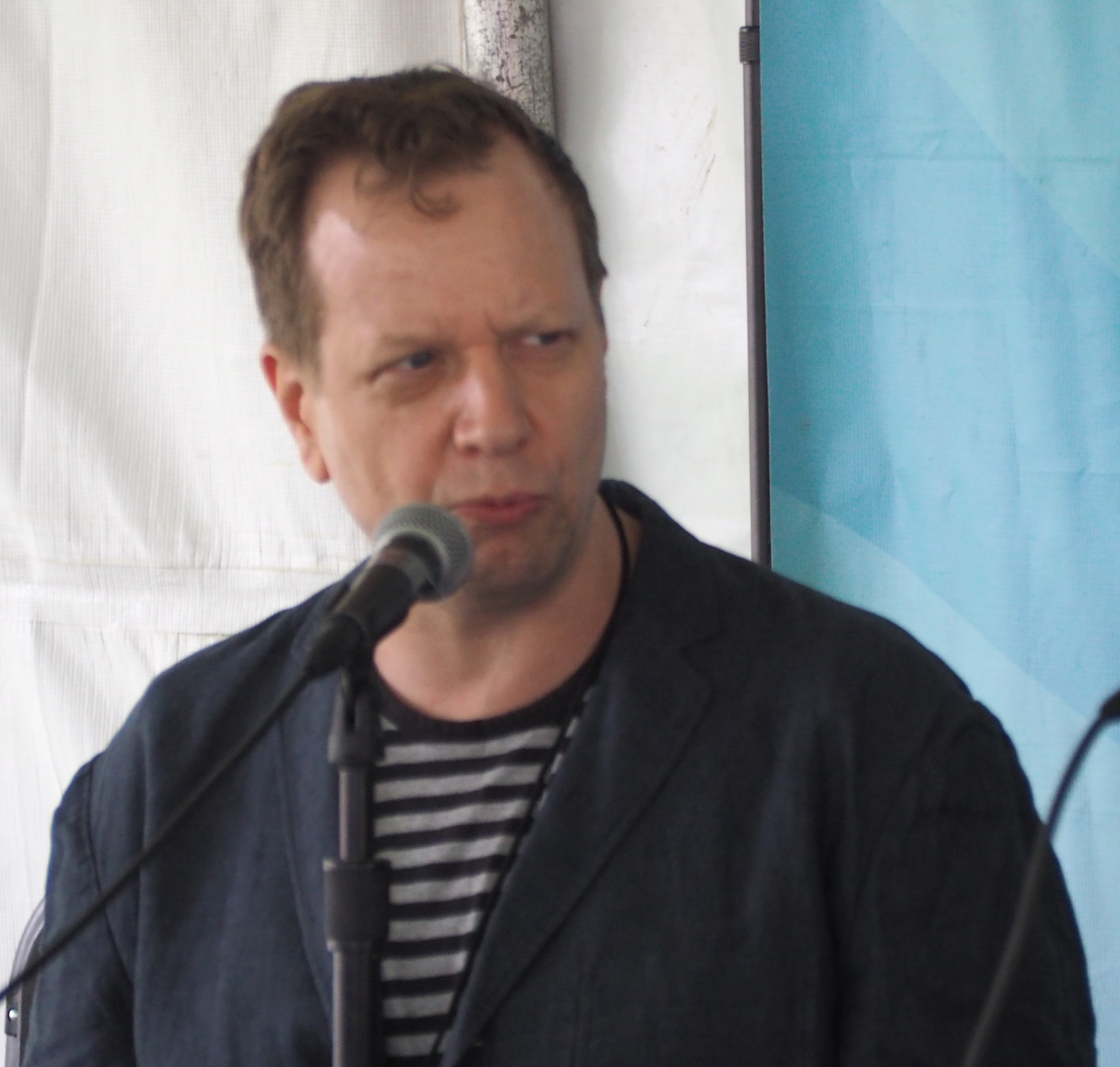
- Born: April 26, 1966 (age 60)
- Areas: Cartoonist, Writer, Artist
- Pseudonym: P. Revess
- Notable works: Tales Designed to Thrizzle; Snake 'n' Bacon's Cartoon Cabaret; All the Answers
- Awards: Eisner Award
- Relatives: Karen Ordahl Kupperman (mother); Joel J. Kupperman (father)

Michael Kupperman (born April 26, 1966), also known by the pseudonym P. Revess, is an American cartoonist and illustrator. He created the comic strips Up All Night and Found in the Street, and has written scripts for DC Comics. His work often dwells in surrealism and absurdity "played as seriously as possible."

His work has appeared in The New Yorker, The New York Times, LA Weekly, The Wall Street Journal, Screw, Fortune, The Independent on Sunday, Libération, Nickelodeon Magazine, The Believer, and Heavy Metal, as well as in comics anthologies such as Hotwire, Snake Eyes, Zero Zero, Hyena, Hodags and Hodaddies, Blood Orange, Rosetta, 106U, and Legal Action Comics. He has also worked on many books and projects for McSweeney's.

== Biography ==
Kupperman spent part of his childhood in England. Later on, back in the United States, his parents became professors at the University of Connecticut. His mother is Karen Ordahl Kupperman, noted historian of Early America. His father is Joel J. Kupperman, the most famous of the original 1940s Quiz Kids. When Michael was young, between ages ten and twelve, he was fascinated with editorial cartoons, particularly the work of Pat Oliphant. As a young man, Kupperman did a political strip for the Washington City Paper.

HarperCollins published Kupperman's book Snake 'n' Bacon's Cartoon Cabaret in 2000. Parts of his work were animated later that year for the Comedy Central show TV Funhouse, produced by Robert Smigel and Dino Stamatopoulos. In 2005, he started a comic book series called Tales Designed To Thrizzle, published by Fantagraphics. As of 2009, Kupperman is writing sketches for a new comedy series starring Peter Serafinowicz, and he created a one-off pilot called Snake 'N' Bacon for the Adult Swim network.

In 2013, Kupperman won the Eisner Award for "Moon 1969: The True Story of the 1969 Moon Launch", published in Tales Designed to Thrizzle Vol. 2, Issue 8.

In 2013, Michael Kupperman started a biography of his father Joel, who was a child celebrity in the 1940s. Kupperman published the book, All the Answers, in May 2018, getting a Publishers Weekly Best Book of the Year award.

Kupperman lives in Brooklyn, New York, with his son, Ulysses Dougherty, and his wife, Muire Dougherty.

== Recurring characters, comics, and themes ==
- Snake 'n' Bacon — A film duo composed of a snake and a strip of bacon. Snake only hisses and Bacon only makes comments about bacon, such as "Pat me with a paper towel to remove excess grease". Aired as a pilot on Cartoon Network May 10, 2009.
- Underpants-On-His-Head Man — A costumed crimefighter who wears underpants on his head
- Hercules — "the public domain superhero" who often smashes things.
- Wonder Book Junior, Boy Detective
- The Mannister — A man who can transform himself into the shape of a banister
- Cousin Grandpa
- Mister Bossman
- Pagus — Jesus's half-brother, worshipped by Pagans
- Long John Silver, as the proprietor of a Sex Blimp
- Mark Twain and Albert Einstein (as a duo)
- Sex Blimps, and their logical inverse, Sex Holes
- [Adjective] District Attorney - A series of bizarre District Attorneys tackling crime with quirks (e.g. Rabid District Attorney, Flying District Attorney, and The District Attorney of a 1000 Faces)
- Remembering the Thirties
- Citobor — An invisible and silent robot ("robotic" spelled backwards)
- Roger Daltrey, looking for "birds" to shag

== Bibliography ==
- Snake 'n' Bacon's Cartoon Cabaret (ISBN 0-380-80790-4) (2000)
- Who Moved My Soap?: The CEO's Guide to Surviving in Prison (illustrator) (2003)
- Stepmother (illustrator) (ISBN 1-932416-09-9) (2004)
- Giraffes? Giraffes! (cover) (2004)
- Your Disgusting Head: The Darkest, Most Offensive and Moist Secrets of Your Ears, Mouth and Nose (cover) (2004)
- The Future Dictionary of America (art, art direction, writing) (ISBN 1-932416-42-0) (2004)
- McSweeneys #16, #19 (art & design) (2004, 2006)
- Nick Mag Presents: Best of Comics (contributor) (2005)
- A Child Again (illustrator) (ISBN 1-932416-22-6) (2005)
- Tales Designed To Thrizzle #1-8 (2005–present)
  - Tales Designed To Thrizzle Vol. 1 (Collects issues 1-4) (ISBN 9781606991640) (2009)
  - Tales Designed To Thrizzle Vol. 2 (Collects issues 5-8) (ISBN 9781606996157) (2012)
- Animals of the Ocean, in Particular the Giant Squid (cover) (2006)
- All Select Comics #1 Marvel (2009)
- Strange Tales #1-3 Marvel (2009)
- Mark Twain's Autobiography 1910-2010 Fantagraphics (2011)
- All the Answers Simon & Schuster (2018)
