= Mostly 4 Millennials =

American television series

- Genre: Surreal comedy Sketch comedy
- Created by: Derrick Beckles
- Written by: Derrick Beckles; Eric André /Dan Curry
- Directed by: Derrick Beckles
- Starring: Derrick Beckles; Fred Durst (as DJ Durst)
- Country of origin: United States
- Original language: English
- No. of seasons: 1
- No. of episodes: 8

Production
- Executive producers: Eric André; Derrick Beckles; Mark Costa (Note: Costa is the executive producer for Factual Productions, Inc.); Keith Crofford (Note: Crofford and Newman are the executive producers for Williams Street); Walter Newman
- Editors: Pete Martich; Andy Maxwell
- Running time: 11 minutes
- Production companies: TV Carnage; Sick Duck Productions; Factual Productions, Inc. Williams Street

Original release
- Network: Adult Swim
- Release: July 2 – July 23, 2018

Related
- Totally for Teens

Mostly 4 Millennials is an American comedy television series on Adult Swim. The series, a satirical look at the Millennial generation, was created and directed by comedian Derrick Beckles and is written and executive produced by Beckles and Eric André. Beckles formerly created the pilot Totally for Teens for Adult Swim in 2009 and the series Hot Package, which aired from 2013 to 2015. Mostly 4 Millennials premiered on July 2, 2018. The show is produced by Factual Productions, Inc.

== Episodes ==
No.	Title	Guest	Original release date	U.S. viewers (millions)
1	"Distractions"	Maggie Lindemann	July 2, 2018	0.60
2	"Feelings & Emotions"	Madison Beer	July 2, 2018	0.50
3	"Diversity"	Snooki	July 9, 2018	0.51
4	"Bravery"	Coby Persin	July 9, 2018	0.46
5	"Interfacing"	Joey Badass	July 15, 2018	0.56
6	"Entitlement"	Ann Coulter	July 15, 2018	0.49
7	"Responsibility"	Steve Wilkos	July 23, 2018	N/A
8	"Empowerment"	Rah Ali	July 23, 2018	N/A
