= Karen Ordahl Kupperman =

American historian (born 1939)

- Born: 23 April 1939 (age 87); Devils Lake, North Dakota
- Education: University of Missouri; Harvard University; University of Cambridge
- Occupation: Historian
- Known for: Providence Island, 1630–1641: The Other Puritan Colony

Karen Ordahl Kupperman (born 23 April 1939) is an American historian who specializes in colonial history in the Atlantic world of the sixteenth and seventeenth centuries.

== Biography ==
Karen Ordahl Kupperman was born in Devils Lake, North Dakota on 23 April 1939, of Swedish and Norwegian ancestry. Her father was a colonel in the United States Army, and the family moved often during her childhood. They lived in Fort Benning, Georgia, Fargo, North Dakota, army posts in Japan and Springfield, Missouri.

She studied history at the University of Missouri, graduating in 1961 with a BA. She was also a member of Kappa Alpha Theta. She obtained a Woodrow Wilson fellowship and studied at Harvard University, earning an MA in 1962.

Karen Kupperman married Joel J. Kupperman, professor of philosophy at the University of Connecticut. They have two children, Michael Kupperman and Charlie Anders Kupperman. While the children were young, Kupperman taught at the University of Connecticut. She moved to the University of Cambridge for two years with her family, earning a PhD in 1978. She then taught at the University of Connecticut until 1995. She was a Mellon Faculty Fellow at Harvard University from 1980 to 1981. In 1995 she became a professor of history at New York University.

Kupperman has been a fellow of the American Philosophical Society, the National Humanities Center, the American Council of Learned Societies, the Rockefeller Foundation, and the National Endowment for the Humanities. She has served on boards and committees of the American Historical Association, Omohundro Institute of Early American History and Culture, William and Mary Quarterly, New England Seminar in American History, Virginia Magazine of History and Biography and the American Antiquarian Society.

== Work and reception ==
Kupperman's focus has been on contacts and ventures in the Atlantic world in the sixteenth and seventeenth centuries, and on the interactions between the participants. Kupperman’s Apathy and Death in Early Jamestown won the Binkley-Stephenson Award of the Organization of American Historians for the best article in The Journal of American History in 1980. Her best-known work may be her 1993 Providence Island, 1630–1641: The Other Puritan Colony, which won the American Historical Association's Albert J. Beveridge Award. Barbadian historian Sir Hilary Beckles has said of this work that it "makes a seminal contribution to early West Indian economic and social history." Her 2000 book Indians and English: Facing Off in Early America won the AHA Prize in Atlantic History.

Her 2007 interpretation of the settlement of early Virginia, The Jamestown Project, argues that the activity of the Virginia Company and the establishment of Jamestown, Virginia must be viewed within the broader context of English expansionary efforts, and that the structure of a functional colony was evolved through trial and error. A reviewer said she merged these ideas well, and produced an engaging and accessible work.

== Bibliography ==
- Kupperman, Karen Ordahl (1980). Settling with the Indians: the meeting of English and Indian cultures in America, 1580-1640. Rowman and Littlefield. p. 224. ISBN 978-0-8476-6210-4.
- Karen Ordahl (ed.) Kupperman (1995-02-20). America in European Consciousness, 1493-1750. UNC Press Books. p. 428. ISBN 978-0-8078-4510-3.
- Kupperman, Karen Ordahl (1995-06-30). Providence Island, 1630-1641: The Other Puritan Colony. Cambridge University Press. p. 393. ISBN 978-0-521-55835-8.
- Kupperman, Karen Ordahl (2000). Indians and English: Facing Off in Early America. Cornell University Press. p. 297. ISBN 978-0-8014-8282-3.
- Kupperman, Karen Ordahl (2007). Roanoke: The Abandoned Colony. Rowman & Littlefield. p. 191. ISBN 978-0-7425-5263-0.
- Kupperman, Karen Ordahl (2008-10-15). The Jamestown Project. Harvard University Press. p. 390. ISBN 978-0-674-03056-5.
- Andrews, Charles M.; Kupperman, Karen Ordahl (2009-06-30). Our Earliest Colonial Settlements: Their Diversities of Origin and Later Characteristics. Cornell University Press. p. 179. ISBN 978-0-8014-7544-3.
- Ligon, Richard; Kupperman, Karen Ordahl (2011-09-30). A True and Exact History of the Island of Barbados. Hackett Publishing. p. 201. ISBN 978-1-60384-620-2.
- Kupperman, Karen Ordahl (2012-01-01). Major Problems in American Colonial History: Documents and Essays. Cengage Learning. p. 467. ISBN 978-0-495-91299-6.
- Kupperman, Karen Ordahl (2012-08-23). The Atlantic in World History. Oxford University Press. p. 144. ISBN 978-0-19-533809-6.
