= Freak Show (TV series) =

American adult animated television series

- Created by: H. Jon Benjamin; David Cross
- Voices of: David Cross; H. Jon Benjamin; Janeane Garofalo; Brian Stack; Jon Glaser; Will Arnett
- Country of origin: United States
- No. of seasons: 1
- No. of episodes: 7

Production
- Producer: Scott Fry
- Running time: 22 minutes
- Production company: Radical Axis

Original release
- Network: Comedy Central
- Release: October 4 – November 16, 2006

Freak Show is an American adult animated sitcom that aired on Comedy Central created by H. Jon Benjamin and David Cross.

The show chronicles a freak show, called the Freak Squad, which reluctantly moonlights as a group of second-rate superheroes employed by the US government.

The only season, which consisted of seven episodes, premiered on October 4, and ended on November 16, 2006. Cross and Benjamin were executive producers in addition to voicing various characters. Radical Axis handled all aspects of production, from initial audio records and character design to final delivery of the master. The series was released on DVD on June 12, 2012.

== Cast ==
=== The Freak Squad ===
Benny and Tuck (David Cross and H. Jon Benjamin, respectively) – Conjoined twins, apparent leaders of the Squad. They are the only members of the squad to possess any semblance of responsibility and duty. They are also the only members of the squad to have actual names, as opposed to simply being referred to by their gimmick. Their super power is the ability to separate for up to 47 years at a time.

The Bearded Clam (Janeane Garofalo) – A giant, anthropomorphic clam with a beard, resembling a morbidly obese, middle-aged woman. Raised by eco-terrorists, she possesses numerous left-wing radical political views, has an anarchist symbol in her shell, and is an adherent to radical feminism. She often puts on demonstrations and rallies, at which she is usually the only participant. It has been implied that she has somewhat of a sordid sexual past, revealing that she's engaged in intercourse in such unconventional locales as the cockpit of an F-16. At times she is displayed as a den mother of sorts to the group, counting among her talents the ability to cook three different ways on a wok. In the series finale, she was killed in a clambake by being cooked alive by a group of Orthodox Jews and then fed to "The Jewish Messiah", a giant made up of circumcised foreskins. Her super power is "Acidic Bitch Juice", an extremely potent form of saliva capable of eating through most kinds of metal, that she can project from her mouth. She also possesses the ability to transform herself into a liquid state, which can then absorb other super-powered individuals and draw upon their abilities to shape shift.

World's Tallest Nebraskan (Brian Stack) – An especially tall man from Nebraska. He is portrayed as the stereotypical "ignorant hick", though he is also the most sensitive member of the Freak Squad, often going out of his way to carefully select words so as to be completely inoffensive, even in situations where upsetting someone else would neither be inappropriate nor even a reality. His super power is the ability to shrink six inches.

Primi the premature baby (David Cross) – A Jewish premature baby with the inexplicable ability to speak and operate a mechanical transport unit. He also inexplicably speaks in metaphors and dead tongues, which apparently only Bearded Clam can understand. He also has some sort of non-American accent, ostensibly Italian. At various points throughout the series, he has been depicted requiring the aid of some sort of incubation unit outfitted with wheels and mechanical gloves in order to be mobile. However, in the season finale, he left the unit and performed acrobatic stunts on his own. His super power is pinpoint vomiting, the ability to vomit at will and direct its flow at any individual he chooses.

Log Cabin Republican (Jon Glaser) – A gay Republican. Usually dressed in a business suit; at times deals with others on behalf of the group. On October 31, 2006, the character the Log Cabin Republican appeared on an episode of The Colbert Report, in which he was interviewed by the host. His super power is the ability to transform into "Burly Bear", who can run up to 60 mph, climb trees, and decapitate victims with one swipe of his immaculately manicured hands.

=== Supporting characters ===
Bob and Helen Hartsdale (Cross and Benjamin respectively) – The kind, older couple who own a freakshow and the Squad. They are often shown as senile people.

Duncan Schiesst (Will Arnett) – Works for Freak-Mart. the world's largest general purpose retailer, trying to purchase Mr. and Mrs. Hartsdale's Freak Show.

Frank Meinkowitz (Todd Barry) – The creator of the Freak Squad who gives them their missions.

World's Smallest Something (Kristen Schaal) – One of the Hartsdale's freaks. It is so small that no one knows its true gender or species. The World's Tallest Nebraskan accidentally stepped on it in the second episode.

Danny the Plumber Guy (Cross) – A parody of Larry the Cable Guy. His catchphrase is "Git to gittn'," a parody of Larry's "Git r done." Creator David Cross is known for being critical of Daniel Whitney's character and routine.

== Episodes ==
No.	Title	Original release date	Prod. code
1	"Premiere"	October 4, 2006	101
The Freak Squad is sent to the island of Jarbala to find delicious Perry nuts, the President's favorite nuts. Back home, the Hartsdales rebuff a buyout attempt by Freak Mart, the world's largest indoor freak pavilion.
2	"Glaucoma"	October 11, 2006	102
The Hartsdales, on their way to Vienna to accept an award for their work in the field of glaucoma research, receive a veiled threat from Freak Mart. Concerned, the Freak Squad outsource their mission (rolling back the mileage on the President's Trans Am) and go to Vienna to protect the Hartsdales.
3	"Git to Gitten'"	October 18, 2006	103
The Freaks perform at a fair with country music superstar Toby Tritt Greenwood. Despite her outspoken liberal stance, the Bearded Clam finds herself falling for the hyper-patriotic singer. When the Freak Squad is ordered to destroy a billboard that slanders the President, will Clam join them on the mission or pursue her love affair?
4	"Separate But Equal"	October 26, 2006	104
The Freak Squad is sent to New York City to scope out an apartment for the President's friend's cat. On the way, Siamese twins Tuck & Benny get into an argument over the merits of INXS and decide to separate. Will the twins settle their differences in time to save the city after Times Square is suddenly threatened by a family of nuclear tourists?
5	"Elections"	November 2, 2006	105
The Freak Squad beams up to New Hampshire to take over a mission from Log Cabin Republican, who has become distracted while running a Senate campaign. When "gay dancing" emerges as a wedge issue, Log is forced to choose between his loyalty to the Republican Party and his fondness for gay dancing.
6	"Mohel-Me-Not"	November 9, 2006	106
7	"Mohel-Me-Not"	November 16, 2006	107
The Hartsdales choose to circumcise Primi while performing in a heavily Jewish community, but does the local rabbi have an ulterior motive? Having used Primi's foreskin to summon Moshiach, the Jewish messiah, Pat Robertson and the President decide to fight back with their own secret weapon. When Primi exposes their plot and is captured, the Freak Squad must come to his rescue.

== Home media ==
DVD name	Release date	Ep #
The Complete Series	June 12, 2012	7
