= Roanoke: The Abandoned Colony =

1984 book

- Author: Karen Ordahl Kupperman
- Genre: Non-fiction
- Published: 1984
- Publisher: Rowman & Allenheld

Roanoke: The Abandoned Colony is a book by Karen Ordahl Kupperman. It was published in 1984 by Rowman and Allenheld.

== Synopsis ==
The book covers the history of both phases of the Roanoke Colony through the lens of Anglo-Indian relations, arguing that food scarcity and suspicion created tension between English settlers and the Native American inhabitants of the area.

== Reception ==
J. Frederick Fausz, in a review for The Journal of American History wrote that "it breaks no new factual ground and offers no novel solutions to the mystery of the 'Lost Colony', Kupperman's engaging style, ethnohistorical emphasis, and ability to personalize the major figures make it the best book on the subject."

Bernard W. Sheehan of The American Historical Review called it "a plausible enough account of the English settlement, but one that unfortunately lacks the depth and subtlety that the clash of culture deserves."
