= Snake 'n' Bacon =

- Genre: Comedy
- Created by: Michael Kupperman; Scott Jacobson; Rich Blomquist
- Written by: Michael Kupperman; Scott Jacobson; Rich Blomquist
- Directed by: Rich Blomquist; Scott Jacobson
- Starring: Dan Bakkedahl; Tim Lagasse; Kristen Schaal; David Rakoff
- Voices of: Chelsea Clark; Bill Hader; Greg Hollimon; Kristen Schaal; Peter Serafinowicz; Brian Stack; James Urbaniak
- Theme music composer: Franklin Bruno
- Opening theme: "Snake 'n' Bacon"
- Ending theme: "Snake 'n' Bacon" (Instrumental)
- Composer: Franklin Bruno
- Country of origin: United States
- Original language: English

Production
- Executive producers: Rich Blomquist; Michael Kupperman; Scott Jacobson
- Producers: Jackie Stolfi; Robert Smigel (consulting producer)
- Cinematography: Bill Berner
- Editor: Rick Broat
- Running time: 11 minutes
- Production companies: Fayettenam Records Corp. Williams Street

Original release
- Network: Adult Swim
- Release: May 10, 2009

Snake 'n' Bacon is a comic book and cartoon duo created by American cartoonist and illustrator Michael Kupperman (also known by his pseudonym P. Revess). Originally only in print comics, the characters were brought to television on May 10, 2009, when they were broadcast on Cartoon Network's Adult Swim block in a Snake 'n' Bacon animated show, but after its pilot the show was not picked up by Cartoon Network for Adult Swim. The Tales Designed to Thrizzle, Vol. 1 collection was published in 2009 by Fantagraphics.

== Characters ==
The characters in the comics were a parody of popular comedy teams. One of the characters is a snake, while the other is a strip of bacon. Other characters in the comic were Criminal District Attorney and Underpants-On-His-Head-Man. Utterances by Snake and Bacon are limited to hissing (on Snake's part) and making bacon-related comments (on Bacon's part) such as "I'm real bacon" and advice such as "Wrap your dog's pill in me." Still, their communications are filled with sexual innuendos.

The characters "highlight what is perhaps Kupperman’s greatest comedic skill—the ability to sell surreal ideas in the most serious way possible, highlighting the humor all the more vividly," according to one reviewer. Kupperman did cartoons for Robert Smigel's TV Funhouse TV series before returning to comic book making with a series for Fantagraphics called Tales Designed to Thrizzle, using many of the characters from Snake 'n' Bacon (including the titular pair) and new characters, such as Hercules ("the public domain superhero") and The Mannister, a man who can transform himself into the shape of a banister.

When the cartoon came to television, it combined animated and live-action sequences, with the help of such people as James Urbaniak ("Bacon"), Dan Bakkedahl, Bill Hader, David Rakoff, Kristen Schaal, Peter Serafinowicz, and Brian Stack. It was followed on the Cartoon Network schedule by "a spiritual cousin", the British comedy The Mighty Boosh.

== Influences and comedic approach ==
Kupperman has created several memorable cartoon characters, written for DC Comics, and has been influenced by absurdity and surrealism. Kupperman is said to use absurdist humor that includes straightforward jokes, pointing out through humor the absurdities of the past that just weren't visible to readers at the time, mimicking "silly" directions people put in books about how to use them, and putting famous people in silly situations.

== Pilot summary ==
The title of this episode is "Psst! Wanna See a Crime Scene?" After being woken up by The Green Fairy (Kristen Schaal) in the cold opening, Snake and Bacon (Tim Lagasse) visit a crime scene were a murder took place. Later, a detective (Dan Bakkedahl) shows Snake and Bacon all of the evidence from the scene, as collected by the Police Vac. After examining the evidence, Snake discovers that the murderer was hiding underneath a penny; Snake and Bacon are ordered to attack the murderer, who appears to admire them. Later, the district attorney (David Rakoff) congratulates them for their achievement. It's at this moment Snake has a realization that the district attorney has been flying above them and spying on them the whole time.

Sketches: "The Head", "The Saga of Teen Grandpa", "Toad to Perdition", "Rabid District Attorney", and "District Attorney of a 1000 Faces"

== Books ==
- Kupperman, Michael (2000). Snake 'n' Bacon's Cartoon Cabaret. New York: HarperCollins. ISBN 0-380-80790-4.
- Kupperman, Michael (2009). Tales Designed to Thrizzle: Volume 1. Seattle: Fantagraphics Books. ISBN 978-1-60699-164-0.
- Kupperman, Michael (2013). Tales Designed to Thrizzle: Volume 2. Seattle: Fantagraphics Books.
