= Spray-on hair =

Aerosol spray to create artificial hair

Spray-on hair or hair in a can is a hairstyling product consisting of an aerosol spray applied to balding areas of the scalp to create artificial hair covering that area. Spray-on hair generally works in one of two ways. Either it directly colors the scalp and enhances whatever hair is in the area by thickening it, or it generates hair-like filaments that cling to the scalp and existing hair.

Spray-on hair was one of the products pioneered by Ronco in the 1980s, under the name "GLH-9" (Great Looking Hair Formula #9). The product "was popular in the 1990s with 30-minute infomercials for the product on late-night cable TV", and the Ronco version sold over a half million cans. GLH came out in liquid form but contained powder particles that stuck to the follicles on the scalp.

In the documentary TV series Bald!, spray-on hair is one of the products tried by a participant on the show, which generated poor results.
