= Cheyenne Cinnamon and the Fantabulous Unicorn of Sugar Town Candy Fudge =

2010 American TV series pilot

- Also known as: Cheyenne Cinnamon
- Genre: Animated; Musical comedy Surreal humor Satire
- Created by: Dave Willis; Matt Harrigan
- Written by: Dave Willis; Matt Harrigan
- Voices of: Neko Case; Doom; Rachel Dratch; Kristen Schaal; MC Chris; Dana Snyder; T-Pain
- Theme music composer: Butch Walker
- Opening theme: "Sugar Town Candy Fudge", performed by Sofia Toufa
- Composer: Butch Walker
- Country of origin: United States
- Original language: English

Production
- Executive producers: Keith Crofford; Mike Lazzo
- Producers: Dave Hughes; Matt Harrigan; Dave Willis
- Editor: Dave Hughes
- Running time: 11 minutes
- Production company: Williams Street

Original release
- Network: Adult Swim
- Release: March 29, 2010

Cheyenne Cinnamon and the Fantabulous Unicorn of Sugar Town Candy Fudge (often shortened to Cheyenne Cinnamon) is an American adult animated television series pilot created by Dave Willis and Matt Harrigan for Cartoon Network's late night programming block Adult Swim. It originally aired on March 29, 2010 but was not picked up for a full series.

== Premise ==
A pregnant young girl named Emily, who is in love with her softball coach, runs away from home but is taken in to be "saved" by Cheyenne.

After a tour of Sugar Town Candy Fudge and "Cocaine-o", the cocaine-spewing volcano, a brief time skip occurs and the young girl, now a teen mother trying to take care of her child, is dragged away from home by Cheyenne for a party. Cheyenne crashes her unicorn after blinding it with a cigarette, leaving the teen mother unconscious.

A frantic Gummi runs to Cheyenne's rescue, demanding to know how much she had to drink and calling the police to report the unicorn as stolen.

== History and production ==
Willis explained the plot as "a Strawberry Shortcake pop princess that lives in a candy wonderland just outside Detroit". She comes into Detroit and helps solve problems of racism and teen pregnancy "with the power of love and teen pop songs". The pilot episode was first released in the United States, as part of the Adult Swim in a Box DVD box set on October 27, 2009. The pilot was later posted on Adultswim.com as part of an online poll entitled "Big, Uber Network Sampling" in early 2010. The pilot episode eventually aired on television in the United States on Adult Swim on March 29, 2010, and had 744,000 viewers.

The central joke of the series is a parody of how pop music sensations are often nothing like their public image: while Cheyenne outwardly projects the image of being a clean and wholesome role model, she is in fact a heavy abuser of drugs and is very promiscuous. For example, Cheyenne can magically transport people to her base of operations in a Candyland-like environment, but it turns out that the volcano that at first appears to be spewing sugar is in fact spewing cocaine, which Cheyenne snorts off-camera.

Alternative country singer Neko Case stars as Cheyenne Cinnamon but does not provide singing vocals. Instead, "her character will lip-synch, and then a decidedly different-sounding voice sings all the songs", according to Dave Willis. Rappers MF Doom, MC Chris and T-Pain provide additional voices. Radical Axis provided animation services. References to the show, including brief clips from the pilot, have been featured in various episodes of Squidbillies, another Adult Swim program which Willis co-created.

Willis mentioned on Twitter that the pilot was not picked up for a full series.

== Characters ==
- Cheyenne Cinnamon (Neko Case) – A pop singer.
- Emily (Kristen Schaal) – A pregnant teenager.
- Gummi (MC Chris) – A talking gummi bear, who is associated with Cheyenne.
- Big Chocolate Bunny (MF Doom) – A big chocolate bunny.
- Gingerbread Bouncer (T-Pain) – A club bouncer.

== Home media ==
On October 27, 2009, Adult Swim, and distributor Warner Home Video, released "Adult Swim in a Box", a seven-disc DVD box set of a variety of different Adult Swim shows. Cheyenne Cinnamon and the Fantabulous Unicorn of Sugar Town Candy Fudge is featured in this set on a bonus DVD along with Korgoth of Barbaria, the pilot episode of Perfect Hair Forever, Totally for Teens, and Welcome to Eltingville; in June 2010, the bonus DVD, from "Adult Swim in a Box", was made available for separate purchase on Adultswimshop.com.
