= Samantha Vice =

South African philosopher

- Born: 12 March 1973 (age 53)
- Citizenship: South Africa
- Occupation: Distinguished Professor at University of the Witwatersrand
- Awards: Commonwealth Scholarship (1999)

Academic background
- Education: Rhodes University (BA, MA); University of Reading (PhD)
- Thesis: Self-Reflection and the Worthwhile Life (2003)
- Doctoral advisor: John Cottingham

Academic work
- Discipline: Philosophy
- Sub-discipline: Normative ethics, social philosophy, aesthetics
- Institutions: Rhodes University, University of the Witwatersrand
- Main interests: Race, white privilege, white guilt, moral emotions
- Notable works: "How Do I Live in This Strange Place?" (2010)

Samantha Wynne Vice (born 12 March 1973) is a South African philosopher who is distinguished professor of philosophy at the University of the Witwatersrand (Wits). Her areas of specialisation are ethics and social philosophy, and she is especially well known for her work on the existential and moral philosophy of race.

== Academic background and positions ==
Born in South Africa, Vice completed her bachelor's and master's at Rhodes University. In 2003, she completed a PhD in philosophy at the University of Reading, which she attended on a Commonwealth Scholarship. Thereafter she joined the philosophy faculty at Rhodes, ultimately becoming the head of the philosophy department. In 2011, she was awarded the Rhodes Vice-Chancellor's Distinguished Research Award, designated for Rhodes faculty under the age of 40, for her research output.

In January 2015, she was appointed as distinguished professor of philosophy at Wits, where she works both in the philosophy department and at the Wits Centre for Ethics. She was admitted to the Academy of Science of South Africa in October 2021.

== Philosophical work ==
Vice's best known work is about race, particularly white privilege and white guilt. Her 2010 article "'How Do I Live in This Strange Place?'", published in the Journal of Social Philosophy while she was a senior lecturer at Rhodes, argued that shame and guilt were appropriate responses to the experience of white people in post-apartheid South Africa; she argued that white people were "even if unavoidably — a continuing product of white privilege and benefiting from it, implicated in and enacting injustice in many subtle ways". After Eusebius McKaiser published a commentary on the article in the mainstream press, her argument sparked heated public debate; the Mail & Guardian published a special report and series of responses, and the Wits Centre for Ethics hosted a seminar on the paper, with a panel comprising Vice, McKaiser, constitutional law scholar Pierre de Vos, and philosophers Ward Jones and David Benatar.

== Selected publications ==
- Vice, Samantha (2003). "Literature and the narrative self". Philosophy. 78 (1): 93–108. doi:10.1017/S0031819103000068.
- Vice, Samantha (2010). ""How do I live in this strange place?"". Journal of Social Philosophy. 41 (3): 323–42. doi:10.1111/j.1467-9833.2010.01496.x.
- Vice, Samantha (2011). "Cynicism and morality". Ethical Theory and Moral Practice. 14: 169–84. doi:10.1007/s10677-010-9250-y.
- Jones, Ward E., and Samantha Vice, eds. 2011. Ethics at the Cinema. Oxford University Press.
- Vice, Samantha (2023). The Ethics of Animal Beauty. Rowman & Littlefield.
