= Hot Package =

- Created by: Derrick Beckles
- Written by: Derrick Beckles
- Directed by: Derrick Beckles
- Starring: Derrick Beckles; Anastasia Roark; Mark McGrath
- Narrated by: Beau Weaver (Opening)
- Country of origin: United States
- Original language: English
- No. of seasons: 2
- No. of episodes: 11

Production
- Executive producers: Derrick Beckles; Dave Kneebone; Tim Heidecker; Eric Wareheim; Jonathan Stern (S01 only)
- Producers: Jonathan Roig; Griffin Pocock
- Cinematography: Carl Herse
- Editor: Derrick Beckels
- Running time: 10–11 minutes
- Production companies: TV Carnage; Abso Lutely Productions; Abominable Pictures (Season 1 only); Williams Street

Original release
- Network: Adult Swim
- Release: October 4, 2013 – 2015

Hot Package is an Adult Swim entertainment variety show, created by Derrick Beckles. The show parodies network entertainment shows such as Entertainment Tonight and Access Hollywood. Instead of sourcing its news from real celebrities, TV shows, and films, all of Hot Package's "entertainment" news comes from found footage, including clips from forgotten B films and bizarre TV shows. The show is hosted by Derrick Beckles, Pat O'Brien, Anastasia Roark, and Mark McGrath, and features colorful guests, makeovers, and interview segments. Hot Package, produced by Abso Lutely Productions, Abominable Pictures, TV Carnage, and Williams Street, premiered on October 4, 2013, and has currently aired eleven episodes. On May 9, 2014, Adult Swim confirmed that Hot Package would be returning for a second season.

The second season of Hot Package premiered on February 27, 2015. Special guest stars include: Mark McGrath, celebrity stalker Jeff Deane Turner, paperback hunk Fabio Lanzoni, ex-Hollywood madam Heidi Fleiss, and cult filmmaker Kenneth Anger.

== Segments ==
The show features a wide variety of segments parodying those found in entertainment news shows. Some of these segments include:

- HP Exclusive – Fake entertainment news based on an out-of-context film, TV, or found footage clip.
- Ones on One – Derrick interviews an obscure figure from film or television as if he/she were a celebrity guest.
- Hollywood Makeover – Derrick gives someone a makeover based on a "Hollywood hunk" from an obscure film/TV clip (such as Jon McBride in Cannibal Campout). Despite a wide number of film sources being used as inspiration, from action B-movies to LSD scare films, the makeovers largely turn out the same each time, usually with no reference to the film in question.
- Countdowns – A list of themed film clips.
- Curtain Raiser – Movie reviews. Again, the movie is always obscure, but treated like a recent Hollywood film.
- Bloopers – Embarrassing found footage.

== Episodes ==
Season	Episodes		Originally released	
Season	Episodes		First released	Last released
1	6	1	September 17, 2013	
1	6	5	October 3, 2013	
2	5		July 15, 2015	August 12, 2015

=== Season 1 (2013) ===
No. overall	No. in season	Title	Directed by	Written by	Original release date	Prod. code
1	1	"Pilot"	Peter Atencio	Derrick Beckles & Curtis Gwinn	September 17, 2013	101
2	2	"Bloopers"	Derrick Beckles	Derrick Beckles & Coert Donohue	October 3, 2013	102
3	3	"Drugs"	Derrick Beckles	Derrick Beckles & Coert Donohue	October 3, 2013	103
4	4	"Mens"	Derrick Beckles	Derrick Beckles & Coert Donohue	October 3, 2013	104
5	5	"Music"	Derrick Beckles	Derrick Beckles & Coert Donohue	October 3, 2013	105
6	6	"Romance"	Derrick Beckles	Derrick Beckles & Coert Donohue	October 3, 2013	106

=== Season 2 (2015) ===
No. overall	No. in season	Title	Directed by	Written by	Original release date	Prod. code
7	1	"Scandal"	Derrick Beckles & Dan Curry	Janicza Bravo & Dan Curry	July 15, 2015	201
8	2	"A Brand New Day"	Derrick Beckles & Dan Curry	Janicza Bravo & Dan Curry	July 22, 2015	202
9	3	"Sex & Violence"	Derrick Beckles & Dan Curry	Janicza Bravo & Dan Curry	July 29, 2015	203
10	4	"The HP Success Award"	Derrick Beckles & Dan Curry	Janicza Bravo & Dan Curry	August 5, 2015	204
11	5	"Fabio's Photo"	Derrick Beckles & Dan Curry	Janicza Bravo & Dan Curry	August 12, 2015	205
