= Perfect Hair Forever =

American adult animated television series

- Emblem of the show
- Genre: Surreal humor
- Created by: Mike Lazzo; Matt Harrigan; Matt Maiellaro
- Voices of: Kim Manning; Matt Maiellaro; Dave Willis; Nick Ingkatanuwat; George Lowe; MF Doom; C. Martin Croker
- Country of origin: United States
- Original language: English
- No. of seasons: 3
- No. of episodes: 9

Production
- Executive producers: Mike Lazzo; Keith Crofford
- Producers: Dave Hughes; Matt Harrigan
- Editors: Dave Hughes; Paul Painter (episodes 8 & 9)
- Running time: 11 minutes
- Production company: Williams Street

Original release
- Network: Adult Swim
- Release: November 7, 2004 – April 1, 2007
- Release: April 1, 2014

Related
- Space Ghost Coast to Coast

Perfect Hair Forever is an American adult animated television series created by Mike Lazzo, Matt Harrigan, and Matt Maiellaro for Cartoon Network's late night programming block Adult Swim. The series revolves around a young boy named Gerald Bald Z and his quest to find perfect hair, parodying story conventions of shōnen anime.

Perfect Hair Forever premiered on November 7, 2004, and ended on April 1, 2007, with a total of 7 episodes. Two additional episodes premiered unannounced on April 1, 2014, as part of Adult Swim's annual April Fools' Day stunt. The series is a spin-off of Space Ghost Coast to Coast.

== Premise ==
The series concerns a young boy named Gerald who is on a quest to find the perfect hair to remedy his premature baldness. He is joined on his wanderings by an array of strange companions. Gerald is opposed by the evil Coiffio and his minions for reasons which are never stated in the series.

The series is a spin-off of Space Ghost Coast to Coast, due to a special featuring Space Ghost, Adult Swim Brain Trust, coming on right after the premiere of the series to help tie it together.

Space Ghost appears in every episode, either as a character with an actual role, or in the background.

== Production ==
Perfect Hair Forever employs an ongoing serial format, a style that had been uncommon to previous Williams Street projects with their lack of emphasis on continuity. Each episode of the series features different opening sequence music and visuals. The style and music of the end credits also varies from episode to episode.

Following the first six episodes, members of the Perfect Hair Forever creative team posted (on the official Adult Swim message board) that they weren't interested in continuing the show to a second season. Cancellation was formally announced at the Adult Swim panel at Comic-Con 2006.

In October 2006, Adultswim.com stated that Perfect Hair Forever was back in production with 16 episodes to be aired on its online streaming network The Fix, though after episode seven aired, the series was never continued.

Episode 7 aired April 1, 2007, as part of Adult Swim's annual April Fool's Day joke, and was also available on Adult Swim's The Fix website.

In 2007, the Japanese noise rock band Melt-Banana recorded the song "Hair-Cat (Cause the Wolf Is a Cat!)" for Perfect Hair Forever.

== Broadcast history ==
The Perfect Hair Forever pilot first aired on November 7, 2004, in the time slot that had been advertised as the premiere of the Squidbillies pilot. Unknown to the audience at the time, the existing Squidbillies pilot had fallen behind and wasn't ready to air. Williams Street continued advertising the Squidbillies premiere up to and including the bump directly preceding the show, which talked about wanting to make the show "perfect" for you and your "hair" "forever", revealing the title "Perfect Hair Forever." The night's confusion continued when, instead of seeing the opening titles for Squidbillies, viewers were confronted with a title card for an episode of Space Ghost called "Perfect Hair Forever", thus starting the pilot episode.

After the ending credits ran, a bumper card appeared, apologizing for the apparent scheduling mixup, only for it to fade out to a fake "Technical Difficulties" card featuring a selection of Perfect Hair Forever's characters. This was shown on screen for several seconds, accompanied by typical music, before the card faded to static whilst the Action Hot Dog's "Do da la la la la!" echoed. The card returned, and the music was replaced with a techno remix of Action Hot Dog's chant.

The first season of Perfect Hair Forever premiered on Sunday, November 27, 2005, at 12:30 AM Eastern Standard Time with the airing of the second episode. The pilot re-aired on November 20, 2005, though without the Adult Swim Brain Trust discussion spoof.

Season 2 was supposed to contain 16 episodes, and was planned to premiere online on Adult Swim Video. On May 22, 2007, "Return to Balding Victory" debuted on Adult Swim Video, officially ending the series. This episode had already aired on television on April 1, 2007, as part of Adult Swim's April Fool's Joke. This joke spanned the entire block, beginning with this episode and then airing all of season one in reverse order and in the style of old VHS fansubs, complete with Engrish subtitles on most episodes. Occasionally, instead of the Engrish subtitles, transcripts from other Adult Swim shows were presented instead. It replaced scheduled premieres of Bleach, Blood+, and Eureka Seven. The prank was hinted at, though, as the schedule listed the same episodes that were to be shown that weekend for the next weekend ahead of time.

Seven years after the series conclusion, an eighth episode was produced and aired unannounced on April 1, 2014, as part of Adult Swim's 2014 April Fools' Stunt. Two versions of this episode, "Muscular Distraction - A" and "Muscular Distraction - B," exist and were aired at 12:00 AM and 12:15 AM, respectively.

== Characters ==
Gerald Bald Z (left) and Uncle Grandfather

- Gerald Bald Z (Kim Manning) – The main protagonist of the story, Gerald, is a young boy suffering from premature hair loss. Because of this, he goes off on a journey to acquire "Perfect Hair Forever". He is portrayed as a sometimes melancholy yet optimistic young lad who believes that his goal is possible. His name is a play on the anime series Dragon Ball Z.
- Uncle Grandfather (Matt Maiellaro) – Described by producer Matt Harrigan as a "bald, pot-bellied, dirty old man," Uncle Grandfather is Gerald's father figure of sorts. He spends almost all of his time snacking, watching Brenda put on lewd displays, or reading pornography. He also exhibits a stereotypical Asian speech impediment, where he pronounces English 'l' sounds as 'r' sounds.
- Brenda – A silent girl whose only means of dialogue is a non-English language, and she is kept by Uncle Grandfather to bring him trays of hamburgers and satisfy his perverted needs.
- Action Hotdog (Will Armstrong) – The first character to join Gerald's journey. Action Hotdog is a hot dog which flies around and is only capable of uttering the words "Doo da la-la-la-la-la-la la la-la-laaaaa-la-la!".
- Norman Douglas (Nick Ingkatanuwat) – A talking tree, also known as the Inappropriate Comedy Tree. Originally an agent of Coiffio, his task was to follow Gerald and watch him.
- Terry/Twisty (Dave Hughes) – A sapient tornado. When he is Terry his eyes are blue, and he seems nice and kind, and when he is Twisty his eyes are red, and he is violent.
- Coiffio (Dave Willis) – The main villain of the series, Coiffio is a self-centered old man with an enormous, multi-colored "coif" atop his head, who otherwise looks like a more fit version of Uncle Grandfather with a slightly different beard. He speaks in an odd, indeterminable accent.
- Catman (Dennis Moloney) – A grumpy, fat man in a catsuit who is Coiffio's main henchman. Catman lives in a large, litterbox-shaped house, and is shown working at a convenience store in several episodes.
- Young Man (C. Martin Croker) – A young, enthusiastic man in a bright purple suit that claims to be from the "Ministry of Planning" and calls himself the "King of All Animals".
- Sherman (MF Doom) - A giraffe that travels primarily with Young Man and his other Animals.
- Rod: the Anime God (Matt Maiellaro) – An entity made of fire, who calls himself the god of anime. Rod is introduced early in the series and pops in at random intervals. Rod is the focus of a secondary plot in the series, involving Coiffio attempting to sell him a house.
- Space Ghost (George Lowe) - Makes a number of random appearances throughout the show.

== Episodes ==
=== Series overview ===
Series overview
Season	Episodes	Originally released	
Season	Episodes	First released	Last released
1	6	November 7, 2004	December 25, 2005
2	1	April 1, 2007	
Bald	2	April 1, 2014	

=== Season 1 (2004–05) ===
No. overall	No. in season	Title	Written by	Original release date	Prod. code
1	1	"Pilot" "Perfect Hair Forever"	Mike Lazzo, Matt Harrigan & Matt Maiellaro	November 7, 2004	101
The first episode concerns a young boy named Gerald who is on a quest to find the perfect hair due to his premature baldness. He seeks help from his "Uncle Grandfather", a pervert who loves to eat and watch his young schoolgirl companion, Brenda, dance around in a short mini-skirt and thong. Also of no particular help is Uncle Grandfather's gift to Gerald, the "Action Hot Dog". Action Hot Dog is a hot dog which chants "do the la la la la!" The hero soon enters a forest, in which he encounters Cat Man, an odd cloud, Space Ghost being mauled by a Bear, Coiffio's robot companion, 'Model Robot', and his arboreal agent, the Inappropriate Comedy Tree. The end credits are written in the Wingdings font and use the song "Love Theme" by Eddie Horst. The credits roll over live action footage of a "dancing clown" windsock.
2	2	"TiVo Your eBay"	Mike Lazzo, Matt Harrigan & Matt Maiellaro	November 28, 2005	102
The second episode featured an opening theme song by Brendon Small. This episode has Gerald walking through the forest where he left off with the "Action Hot Dog" following him as a companion. Meanwhile, Uncle Grandfather meets a young man dressed in a shiny purple coat who claims to be "King of all Animals". Uncle Grandfather gives him a hamburger necklace. He is then sent off to assist Gerald, accompanied by a group of loud animals crammed into an economy hatchback. Meanwhile, Gerald is confronted by a flame-like entity named Rod, who calls himself the "Anime God". Gerald continues towards his destination, Tuna Mountain, now followed by the Inappropriate Comedy Tree.
3	3	"Cat Snatch Fever"	Mike Lazzo, Matt Harrigan & Matt Maiellaro	December 5, 2005	103
The third episode featured an opening theme song by the band Melt-Banana called "Hair-cat ('Cause the wolf is a cat!)". The Inappropriate Comedy Tree joins Gerald and Hot Dog on their quest. They were then accosted by a tornado. Uncle Grandfather watches in amusement from his roof. Upon going back inside, Rod suddenly appears before him and tells Uncle Grandfather that Gerald and Co. are still alive. Uncle Grandfather summons a hot dog bun to ensnare him. Rod disappears, and Uncle Grandfather sends the bun to find Gerald and tell him a message. He then calls Brenda, proclaiming that he has news of the utmost importance, and drops some change on the ground. Brenda picks it up, with Uncle Grandfather watching. The tornado turns out to be a friendly, if somewhat unstable, creature named Terry/Twisty. Coiffio, in his spaceship is bathing in his hot tub. He goes on about how he needs his robe to cover his "hot bod", while mispronouncing words. He goes off to talk to Catman, and once again, achieves next to nothing. The Animal King, while arguing with his animal subjects, succeeds in driving right into a ditch. Gerald, while walking along, begins to hear voices in the stump of his severed ear and the scene shifts to Brenda in a dark room, whispering in Japanese, into Gerald's ear. Uncle Grandfather bursts into the room, accompanied by unidentified policemen saying that Brenda has caused the beginning of the Cat-Bun Wars! The last scene shows the armies of each side converging on each other, ready to fight. After the credits, Coiffio plays a tune.
4	4	"Happy Suck Day"	Mike Lazzo, Matt Harrigan & Matt Maiellaro	December 12, 2005	104
The episode begins with the Cat-Bun Wars in progress. The Young Man and his animals hear the battle from the ditch, which is in the middle of the battlefield. The Young Man tries to use the hamburger necklace, which is stolen by Astronomic Cat, along with his hand. The opening sequence plays, which shows neon-colored versions of all the characters flying around in the dark, with Gerald constantly walking. Space Cat takes the necklace and the Young Man's hand to Coiffio, who then demands Model Robot turn in into an A-Bomb. Model Robot does so, explodes, and sends Coiffio into space. He then sings a song about Model Robot. Coiffio drifts back to the ship, where Rod tries to buy his house from him. Coiffio commands Space Cat to run a background check on him. At the grocery store where Catman works, Catman sells a 12-pack of beer to a baby. Coiffio parachutes in to the front of the store, just to be run over by the drunk-driving baby and shot by Catman. The baby drives into the ditch with the Young Man and the animals. Uncle Grandfather tries to videotape a vacuum cleaner having sex with a cake, but is asked to end the Cat-Bun Wars. He does so by asking the leaders from the Cats and from the Buns to sign a peace treaty. The episode ends with the Young Man still stuck in the hole with the animals and the drunk baby. Coiffio is still after Gerald. Uncle Grandfather is still taping his porno about the vacuum and cake, when he is suddenly held at gunpoint by an MP. The credits roll, with neon Gerald walking far into the distance. The end theme "Space Ho's" is by DangerDoom.
5	5	"Tusk"	Mike Lazzo, Matt Harrigan & Matt Maiellaro	December 19, 2005	106
The ending theme song for this episode is performed by Widespread Panic. Twisty and Norman Douglas get into a knife fight while Gerald and Hotdog go off without them. Gerald runs into Catman and his trailer in the forest and is offered LSD by Rod. Coiffio shows up on an oversized motorcycle whose spokes are made of hot dogs, and challenges Gerald to a race to the death. In exchange for Coiffio agreeing to sell his house to him, and Gerald agreeing to buy Rod's Journey tickets, Rod magically transports the two (along with most of the other characters) to a racetrack, where buns and cats fill the stands, and the Young Man and the giraffe provide the commentary from the booth. Catman releases an alligator onto the track to attack Gerald, but it goes after Coiffio instead. Astronomic Cat lifts the alligator off of Coiffio's bike and onto Gerald's, but Hotdog transforms into a "wienercycle" and saves Gerald by dueling with the gator. Gerald appears to have the advantage when Coiffio's hair falls off, as it is actually a toupee, but he abandons the race when he sees a chance to launch his bike to Tuna Mountain.
6	6	"Woke up Drunk"	Mike Lazzo, Matt Harrigan & Matt Maiellaro	December 25, 2005	105
Gerald and his companions come ever closer to Tuna Mountain after several musical and laughtrack segments along with a conference by worried corporate television executives over the poor audience reaction to "Japanese Bear Dad". The executives are interrupted by a drunken Space Ghost looking for work. Gerald and his companions continue walking toward Tuna Mountain. At the end, we see three military policemen in bed, apparently having sex though none of them move. The end theme is by Diplo.

=== Season 2 (2007) ===
No. overall	No. in season	Title	Written by	Original release date	Prod. code
7	1	"Return to Balding Victory"	Mike Lazzo, Matt Harrigan & Matt Maiellaro	April 1, 2007	201
Gerald wakes up after his crash and continues his journey to Tuna Mountain. Soon the forest and all surrounding areas fall victim to a friendly flood named Wetsy.

=== Season Bald (2014) ===
No. overall	No. in season	Title	Written by	Original release date	Prod. code	US viewers (millions)
8 9	1 2	"Muscular Distraction"	Mike Lazzo, Matt Harrigan & Matt Maiellaro	April 1, 2014	301 302	1.463 (Part 1) 1.274 (Part 2)
After eight years, Gerald's quest continues. Gerald feels anxiety about Brenda getting married.

== International broadcast ==
In Canada, Perfect Hair Forever previously aired on Teletoon's Teletoon at Night block and on the Canadian version of Adult Swim.

== Home media ==
On October 27, 2009, Adult Swim and distributor Warner Home Video released Adult Swim in a Box, a seven-disc DVD box set of various Adult Swim shows.

The pilot episode of Perfect Hair Forever appears in this set. In June 2010, the individual DVD was made briefly available for purchase at the Adult Swim website store.

The first season was released on iTunes. The entire series has been made available for free streaming on the Adult Swim website.

== See also ==
- Gēmusetto, another anime parody series produced by Williams Street
