= List of Squidbillies episodes =

Squidbillies is an American adult animated sitcom created by Jim Fortier and Dave Willis for Cartoon Network's late night programming block, Adult Swim. An unofficial pilot for the series aired on April 1, 2005. The series later made its official debut on October 16, 2005 and ended on December 12, 2021, with a total of 132 episodes over the course of 13 seasons.

The series is about the Cuyler family, an impoverished family of anthropomorphic hillbilly mud squids living in the Georgia region of the Blue Ridge Mountains. The series revolves around the exploits of an alcoholic father (Early), who is often abusive in a comedic way towards his family. His teenage son, Rusty, is desperate for his approval; his mother and grandmother, known in the show as Granny, is often the center of his aggression; and Lil, Early's sister, is mostly unconscious in a pool of her own vomit.

== Series overview ==
Series overview
Season	Episodes	Originally released	
Season	Episodes	First released	Last released
1	6	October 16, 2005	November 20, 2005
2	14	September 17, 2006	December 24, 2006
3	20	January 20, 2008	June 8, 2008
4	10	May 17, 2009	July 19, 2009
5	10	May 16, 2010	July 18, 2010
6	10	September 11, 2011	November 13, 2011
7	6	July 22, 2012	August 26, 2012
8	9	August 11, 2013	October 13, 2013
9	10	September 21, 2014	November 30, 2014
10	9	July 10, 2016	November 20, 2016
11	10	October 15, 2017	December 17, 2017
12	9	August 11, 2019	September 15, 2019
13	9	November 7, 2021	December 12, 2021

== Episodes ==
=== Season 1 (2005) ===
No. overall	No. in season	Title	Original release date	Prod. code
1	1	"This Show is Called Squidbillies"	October 16, 2005	101
The backstory for the series, focusing on Rusty's conception and childhood leading to his reunion with his father, Early. Guest appearances: Christian Danley and Lane Grayson
2	2	"Take This Job and Love It"	October 23, 2005	102
Early is fired from his job selling mattresses and must find new employment to avoid violating his parole. In the end he is hired by Dan Halen as the new CEO of Dan Halen Sheetrock International. Halen explains his role is to be a figurehead and fall guy in the lawsuits being pressed against the company. Theme song performer: Billy Joe Shaver
3	3	"School Days, Fool Days"	October 30, 2005	103
The Sheriff informs Early that Rusty must be given an education, so Early decides to home-school him after a major incident.
4	4	"Chalky Trouble"	November 6, 2005	104
An anti-white people rally leads to the revelation that Rusty's mother is white.
5	5	"Family Trouble"	November 13, 2005	105
Rusty is reunited with his mother, Krystal, leading to questions and testing regarding his paternity.
6	6	"Office Politics Trouble"	November 20, 2005	106
Dan Halen Industries begins mass-producing Early's homemade alcohol under the brand name "Glug".

=== Season 2 (2006) ===
No. overall	No. in season	Title	Original release date	Prod. code
7	1	"Government Brain Voodoo Trouble"	September 17, 2006	201
The Sheriff and Early visit a therapist together and resolve none of their issues. Guest appearance: Jonathan Katz as "The Rapist" (uncredited)
8	2	"Butt Trouble"	September 24, 2006	202
Rusty begins laying eggs, to Early's dismay.
9	3	"Double Truckin' the Tricky Two"	October 1, 2006	203
When the state investigates Dan Halen's blatantly rigged lottery, Halen rigs the next drawing so someone else (Early) wins, only to reveal the gruesome nature of the prize.
10	4	"Swayze Crazy"	October 8, 2006	204
Early is trying to teach Rusty to be tough and trash talk. Sheriff shows up and weighs in. When Early mentions Road House, Sheriff informs the Cuylers that Patrick Swayze is in town. Sheriff introduces an enthusiatic Early to a bald, overweight double-amputee claiming to be Swayze. Early asks "Swayze" to beat Rusty up, and "Swayze" assents, but proceeds to start singing and dancing with Rusty. Early invites "Swayze" to stay at their home. Rusty suspects he is a fraud and tries to enlighten his father. Sheriff then brings the real Patrick Swayze to the Cuyler home (albeit mistaking him for an impostor), and the false Swayze promptly kills the real Swayze. A pizza delivery man shows up, and "Swayze" challenges him to fight. Early encourages Rusty to fight the delivery driver, and Early begins dancing with him. "Swayze" departs, stealing the delivery man's car.
11	5	"Giant Foam Dickhat Trouble"	October 15, 2006	205
Early wears his "party hat" – which depicts a donkey erection – to church, upsetting the Pastor. Pastor burns the hat on a pyre and admonishes Early. Early attempts to steal the church's loudspeakers, but is crushed when a speaker falls on him. He begins ascending to Heaven, but awakens. The experience leaves him born-again. Early proceeds to live a more spiritual life, speaking in tongues, carrying snakes, and proselytizing (in tongues). He chains himself to a sculpture of the Ten Commandments in front of a courthouse to prevent its removal. Jesus appears and explains to him that the statue is just a beer advertisement and asks Early to stop talking about him. In exchange, Jesus performs a miracle for Early, changing the pouring rain into barrel-aged single-malt whiskey. Guest appearance: Fred Armisen as Squid Jesus.
12	6	"Meth O.D. to My Madness"	October 22, 2006	206
Early buys land and tries to make money on it, including drafting Lil into cooking meth.
13	7	"The Tiniest Princess"	October 29, 2006	207
On Halloween night the family confronts the local monsters. Guest appearance: Jon Wurster as Skyler.
14	8	"Asses to Ashes, Sluts to Dust"	November 5, 2006	208
Granny is hospitalized, in need of an operation the family can't afford.
15	9	"Bubba Trubba"	November 12, 2006	209
Comedian Plumber Bubba (a parody of Larry the Cable Guy) does a show in town. Guest appearance: Gregory Alan Williams
16	10	"Burned and Reburned Again"	November 19, 2006	210
A lonely Early feels tempted to have sex with an unconscious Lil, but is stopped by Granny and Rusty. He goes into town to look for love. He strikes out at a rest stop bathroom, then visits Krystal and they promptly reconcile. Before long they are fighting again, and Early goes out to "chop wood" (his euphemism for masturbation) with a car tire. Krystal promises Early a treat if he comes home early from work, so Early rushes to work then leaves work a mere moment later. He finds the band 38 Special with Krystal, and they admit they were making love. The couple seeks counseling from the Pastor, and he advocates they both reduce their respective masturbation and infidelity. Back at home, the couple fights again, and Sheriff arrives to intercede in their domestic disturbance. Early initially blames his bruises on Granny, who Sheriff begins to arrest, but Rusty convinces Early to tell the truth. Sheriff arrests Krystal, and Early steals one of Sheriff's tires to make love with it. Sheriff protests, but Granny interrupts him, telling him to let Early "have this moment". Guest appearance: Don Barnes, Danny Chauncey, and Larry Junstrom of 38 Special as themselves.
17	11	"Terminus Trouble"	November 26, 2006	211
Sheriff visits the Cuyler home and informs Early that the Atlanta police have put out a warrant for his arrest – albeit under his pseudonym, "Awesome Bill from Dawsonville". Sheriff warns Early to stay out of Atlanta, which Early immediately disregards, replying that Atlanta is "funner than Hell", and proceeding to travel to Atlanta with Rusty and Sheriff. They take in some paltry sights: CNN headquarters, Stone Mountain, the Atlanta Cyclorama, and a streetcorner where a scene in Six Pack was shot. They attend an Atlanta Braves game, where Early assaults a player and gets arrested. At his trial, he maintains that the player gave him a dirty look, and the judge and prosecutor concede that according to Georgia law, that makes the assault justified and legal. Guest appearances: Mike Schatz as the consoler & Ned Hastings as the judge.
18	12	"Survival of the Dumbest"	December 10, 2006	212
Another squid causes Rusty to question the nature of life. Guest appearance: Patton Oswalt as the giant one-eyed squid.
19	13	"A Sober Sunday"	December 17, 2006	213
Dan Halen introduces Proposition 421 to overturn the laws barring liquor sales on Sundays.
20	14	"Rebel with a Claus"	December 24, 2006	214
On Christmas night Early captures and ransoms Santa Claus. Note: This is the last episode to be in 4:3.

=== Season 3 (2008) ===
No. overall	No. in season	Title	Original release date	Prod. code
21	1	"Webnecks"	January 20, 2008	301
Rusty's knack for computers leads to a robotic revolution in Dougal County. Note: This is the first episode produced in 16:9 High Definition.
22	2	"Beast Implants"	January 27, 2008	302
After Granny's skin is burnt off, she has her body parts replaced with different animals, which causes her to act like them.
23	3	"Tween Steam"	February 3, 2008	303
Dan Halen hires Rusty to attract pedophiles for a sting operation/reality TV show, making him a celebrity—until he begins puberty.
24	4	"Wing Nut"	February 10, 2008	304
Dan Halen Industries genetically engineers a chicken entirely made of Buffalo wings.
25	5	"Mephistopheles Traveled Below to a Southern State Whose Motto Is 'Wisdom, Justice and Moderation'"	February 17, 2008	305
Rusty sells his soul to the devil in exchange for guitar skills. To preserve his ego, Early does the same. Guest appearance: Brendon Small as the Devil.
26	6	"Earth Worst"	February 24, 2008	306
After Early sells some of the land for commercial use, the family has a run-in with a group of hippies. Guest appearance: Fred Armisen, Rachel Dratch, and Jon Wurster as a group of hippies.
27	7	"The Good One"	March 2, 2008	307
Lil gives birth to a large number of babies, which Early gathers into a sack, intending to euthanize them by drowning. In their boat, Rusty tries to stop Early, and Sheriff appears and decisively stops him. Back at the Cuyler home, Sheriff explains to Rusty that many of the babies are sickly, suffering from drug addiction, diabetes, stab wounds, or themselves being pregnant. Sheriff identifies a baby with a knife as the stabber and approaches it, cheerfully commenting, "ain't you a little pistol?" The baby steals Sheriff's pistol and shoots him with it. Early lauds the shooter as "wild" and begins to parent him, ignoring the other babies. Early teaches the baby to fish, drive, rob Boyd's liquor store, and break out of Sheriff's jail. Early dubs the baby Herschel, and dismisses Rusty as "mild". Early and Herschel go to train tracks, where they have a campfire and drink. Drunkenly, Early stumbles onto the train tracks and is run over by a train. He asks Herschel to get help, and Herschel leaves. The following day, Early is still waiting for help. Herschel appears, steals his hat, and abandons him. Rusty rescues Early, and back at home, Early fondly reflects on how he raised Herschel.
28	8	"Sharif"	March 9, 2008	308
Dan Halen tests his new product, a bodyspray called Ice Wind, by spraying it all over Dougal County. Ice Wind turns out to be devastating chemical weapon, disintegrating people's flesh, leaving only their skeletons. Sheriff confronts Halen, who fires him, replacing him with Deputy Denny. Sheriff, now going by his birth name, Sharif, is initially depressed about losing his job, but later finds happiness training for "tough man competitions" and blogging. The Cuylers convince Sheriff he must return to law enforcement and stop the devastating cloud of Ice Wind. Sheriff constructs a "hillbilly hazmat suit" from duct tape and garbage bags, which promptly suffocates him.
29	9	"Condition: Demolition!"	March 16, 2008	309
After accompanying his father to "Make Your Child Do Work Day", Rusty enters a demolition derby. Guest appearance: Eric "Butterbean" Esch as himself.
30	10	"The Appalachian Mud Squid: Darwin's Dilemma"	March 23, 2008	310
A documentary on "ignorant land squids"—the Cuylers—is filmed in Dougal County. Guest appearance: David Jackson
31	11	"The Unbearable Heatness of Fire"	April 6, 2008	311
The Sheriff investigates the cause of a fire that claims the Cuyler home. Early disingenuously blames a UFO, prompting Sheriff to launch an investigation into extraterrestrials.
32	12	"Tuscaloosa Dumpling"	April 13, 2008	312
The Cuylers put Rusty through a number of trials to prove his maturity.
33	13	"Armageddon It On!"	April 20, 2008	313
The Rapture occurs and various Dougal County residents ascend to Heaven, while others do not. Guest appearances: Riley Martin as the Horseman of Pestilence (one of the Four Horsemen of the Apocalypse) and Larry Munson as voice of God. A caricature of Unknown Hinson can be seen ascending as the rapture begins.
34	14	"Gimmicky Magazine Show Spoof Parody About Dan Halen"	April 27, 2008	314
A news magazine interviews and profiles the achievements and scandals of Dan Halen.
35	15	"Flight of the Deep Fried Pine Booby"	May 4, 2008	315
Early, Rusty, and the Sheriff hunt Georgia's rarest bird, the Deep Fried Pine Booby. After catching one, the bird pleads for its life, and demonstrates that its spray has miraculous properties.
36	16	"An Officer and a Dental Dam"	May 11, 2008	316
After Granny takes ill and dies, Early takes her personal effects to an antiques appraisal television program. Her letters indicate she had an affair with Confederate General Robert E. Lee. Early and Rusty visit a Civil War museum exhibit depicting Granny's relationship with Lee. The exhibit features a quote attributed to Lee, promising to return from the dead and resurrect Granny with his lovemaking. Rusty suggests they attempt to make this come to pass, so they hold a seance at Lee's grave. Lee's ghost appears, and informs them he never had a relationship with Granny. They realize the letters are forgeries. Meanwhile, Sheriff, disguised as Lee, bids Granny farewell post coitus.
37	17	"The Okaleechee Dam Jam"	May 18, 2008	317
When Dougal County is forced to conserve water due to a drought, Dan Halen enacts a complicated plan to get all the water he needs. First, he identifies Early as an excellent line dancer. Then Halen arranges for David Allan Coe to perform at the "Georgia Peanut Bowl Dome" and tasks Coe with performing a new song called "The Okaleechee Dam Jam". The lyrics describe employing a truck filled with fertilizer to bomb the Okaleechee Dam, and Early line dances along, hypnotically following the lyrics instructions, ultimately blowing up the dam. Guest appearance: David Allan Coe as himself (uncredited)
38	18	"Pile M for Murder"	May 25, 2008	318
Dan Halen grows a tail and horn and hears a voice, prompting him to commission the building of "Mount Murder". Meanwhile, The Cuylers accidentally give away all of their mud, leaving them no money for gas nor mud on which to go muddin'. Guest appearance: Riley Martin as Dan Halen's conscience
39	19	"Mud Days and Cornfused"	June 1, 2008	319
Dougal county celebrates Mud Days, during which Dan Halen presents the community with a corn maze. Halen's new GMO plant, Cornzu, overgrows the entire town. Guest appearance: Vernon Chatman as Shuckey the Corn Mascot.
40	20	"Krystal, Light"	June 8, 2008	320
Krystal wins the lottery and has an "esophageal bypass" to lose weight. Dan Halen courts her in pursuit of her weath.

=== Season 4 (2009) ===
No. overall	No. in season	Title	Original release date	Prod. code
41	1	"Lerm"	May 17, 2009	401
A UFO driven by a malicious alien named Lerm crashes into the Cuyler house. Early and Lerm fight, but are broken up by Sheriff. The two realize they have plenty in common and become friends. After making plenty of mischief, Early is exhausted and suggests Lerm needs a woman in his life. Lerm weds Lil, kills her, then runs for public office with his newfound American citizenship. At Lerm's campaign rally, Sheriff convinces Early the must put a stop to Lerm and his platform of "Death to America". Early detonates a nuclear bomb in Dougal County. Guest appearance: Soilent Green provide the theme song.
42	2	"The Liar, the Bitch, and the Bored Rube"	May 24, 2009	402
Early tries to prevent Rusty from learning how to read, but Rusty surreptitiously continues reading. When Early discovers this, he plans to bomb the Dougal County book fair. Early ties Rusty up and departs for the book fair. Rusty is visited by the imaginary characters from his books, who plead him to stop his father and help him get free of his bonds. At the book fair, Early's bomb does not detonate. Dean Koontz points out that Early's "bomb" is missing all the vital components of a functional explosive, and recommends Early read the Black Panthers' book on overthrowing the government. Early concedes he can't read, and Koontz shares that despite being an author, he himself can't read either, alleging that many famous authors can't read. Sheriff offers to teach both of them, and as they sit on Sheriff's lap reading "Fun with Bill and Claire" all three of them are shot in the head by Rusty attacking with a sniper rifle at the behest of another imaginary book character. Note: The title is a reference to the 1950 novel, The Lion, the Witch, and the Wardrobe.
43	3	"The Fine Ol' Solution"	May 31, 2009	403
Early heads a campaign against illegal Mexican immigrants. Dan Halen initially opposes Early's campaign, but then decides to simply offshore his factories to Mexico. Sheriff and the Cuylers begin building a wall to keep Mexicans out, but immediately tire of the work and employ Latino day laborers to finish the project. Soon their wall is complete, but instead of the Mexican border, the wall only encases the Cuyler property. Sheriff and the Cuylers realize they are trapped inside and lack food, so they build a giant slingshot to launch Rusty out to procure food. Weeks later, the starving Cuylers – who have eaten Sheriff – receive a letter in Spanish from Rusty who reports he has married a Mexican woman and integrated with the Mexican community.
44	4	"Anabolic-holic"	June 7, 2009	404
Early disassembles Granny's walker to use the parts for extending his shotgun barrel. They head to town to procure more walkers (so Early can use them for more gun barrels) and along the way encounter Thunderclap Cherokee Antwone, a retired wrestler. Thunderclap tells them of his tragic downfall, and they convince Thunderclap to return to wrestling. Rusty is trained to wrestle Thunderclap and given steroids. At the match, Rusty maims Thunderclap and Sheriff. Afterward, in court Rusty defends against claims of juicing. Guest appearances: Mick Foley as Thunder Clap (uncredited), George Lowe as wrestling-promo voice, and Brendon Small.
45	5	"Confessions of a Gangrenous Mind"	June 14, 2009	405
Rusty asks Granny about his grandfather, resulting in a tale about her days as a slave. Note: The title is a reference to the 2002 film, Confessions of a Dangerous Mind. Guest appearance: Stan Robak as Pompidov
46	6	"The Big Gay Throwdown"	June 21, 2009	406
The Sheriff goes deep undercover at a homosexual gathering to bring down the biggest gay in town.
47	7	"Atone Deaf"	June 28, 2009	407
The Sheriff tries to help Early overcome his anger issues.
48	8	"God’s Bro"	July 5, 2009	408
When Dan Halen uses a black hole to dispose of a hooker's body, God's bad-boy brother emerges from it. Guest appearances: Mike Schatz as the scientist, A. Smith Harrison as Dr. Horny and a narrator.
49	9	"Reunited, And It Feels No Good"	July 19, 2009	409
A family reunion incites a visit from Durwood, Early's city-living younger brother. Guest appearance: Dan Triandiflou as Durwood
50	10	"Not Without My Cash Cow!"	July 19, 2009	410
Rusty is abducted by his uncle Durwood and taken to the city, only to discover his new family is hardly more functional than his old one. Meanwhile, Early gets caught up in the media attention from Rusty's disappearance. Guest appearance: Dan Triandiflou as Durwood

=== Season 5 (2010) ===
No. overall	No. in season	Title	Original release date	Prod. code
51	1	"The Need for Weed"	May 16, 2010	501
The discovery of Lil's secret marijuana operation brings jamband Widespread Panic to Dougal County. Guest appearances: Widespread Panic as themselves, Brendon Small as CIA agent
52	2	"The Many Loves of Early Cuyler"	May 23, 2010	502
Early starts his own cult and marries a bunch of women in a "Jim Jones" like manner. Guest appearance: Mamie White (Jesco White's real-life sister) as Krystal's cousin.
53	3	"Dead Squid Walking"	May 30, 2010	503
Rusty receives a treasure map from his great-grandfather in a prison. Guest appearances: Jesco White as Ga-Ga-Pee-Pap Cuyler and George Lowe as wrestling promo voice.
54	4	"Young, Dumb, and Full of Gums"	June 6, 2010	504
Dan Halen tells everyone in Dougal County that Obama is putting fluoride and other mind-bending drugs in the water supply to sterilize the town.
55	5	"Holodeck Redneck"	June 13, 2010	505
Advances in holodeck technology allow Early to visit Florida. Guest appearances: Billie Reaves as Mammy (Granny's real mother), Jonathan Katz as the Holodeck Therapist (uncredited).
56	6	"Frivolacious Squidigation?"	June 20, 2010	506
Early sues Dan Halen after Granny gets hurt on one of the rides at the fair.
57	7	"Fatal Distraction"	June 27, 2010	507
Early's GPS unit develops a bromance with him and tries to kill off Granny and Rusty so it and Early can be together. Guest appearances: Paul Stanley of Kiss as himself, Tim "Action Plan" Andrews as homicidal GPS.
58	8	"Clowny Freaks"	July 4, 2010	508
Rusty gets into a rap band and the fever catches Early as they both become "Clowny Freaks". Rusty eventually loses interest but not Early. Guest appearances: Andrew Montesi as Festival of the Clowny Freak commercial voice-over, Todd Snider as lobster freak, Larry Wachs as birthday clown Note: The rap group in this episode is a reference to the Insane Clown Posse.
59	9	"Lean Green Touchdown Makifying Machine"	July 11, 2010	509
Rusty discovers that he is one of the greatest football players around and this affords him a chance to go to college, while Early tries to profit from Rusty's talent. Guest appearances: Chad Ochocinco as himself, Phil Hendrie, Will Forte (uncredited) as Tom Treebow.
60	10	"America: Why I Love Her"	July 18, 2010	510
A very special Squidbillies musical in which Early and the rest of the group sing about how much they love the United States of America, while defending Dougal County against al-Qaeda's plot to invade Alabama. Note: This is the first half-hour episode.

=== Season 6 (2011) ===
No. overall	No. in season	Title	Original release date	Prod. code
61	1	"Asbestos I Can"	September 11, 2011	603
Early's addiction to asbestos hats gives him a terminal disease, and the Sheriff decides to let Early have his last wishes granted. Guest appearances: T-Pain, Kevin Gillespie, and Brendon Small Theme song performer: Billy Joe Shaver
62	2	"Class of '86"	September 18, 2011	604
The 25-year high school reunion rolls around. Dan Halen forces the Sheriff to keep Early from the party (as he dropped out in second grade), while the Sheriff begins to have flashbacks to Dan Halen's bullying.
63	3	"Velvet Messiah"	September 25, 2011	602
Early steals Granny's picture of Jesus and exploits the townspeople by hiding behind the picture and making demands. Guest appearance: Tim "Action Plan" Andrews Theme song performers: Trampled by Turtles
64	4	"The Big E"	October 2, 2011	605
Early attacks and nearly kills a radio announcer that upsets him. He ends up taking the announcer's job and takes the title "Big E". He ends up losing the job when the announcer gets out of the hospital and shoots him in the face during a book signing. The end of the episode has a tribute to the late George Jones who sang the theme for this episode. Guest appearances: Dave Stone and Jeff B. Davis Theme song performer: George Jones
65	5	"Keeping It in the Family Way"	October 9, 2011	606
Rusty finds a girlfriend and has sex for the first time. Early, infatuated with Rusty's girlfriend, becomes upset to and tries to break them up. Rusty later finds out that he is going to be a father and comes looking for her only to find that she has run away to be with her mother. He finds her and discovers that they are cousins. Guest appearance: Elizabeth Cook Theme song performer: Elizabeth Cook
66	6	"Snow Daddy"	October 16, 2011	601
Rusty forms a bond with a magical snowman who sheds doubt on Early's parenting skills. Guest appearances: The Mighty Ohba, Ryuu Sato, and George Robinson Theme song performers: Western Crooners
67	7	"Ballmart"	October 23, 2011	607
Sheriff hires Granny and Early as greeters in Dan Halen's new Ball Mart super store. Theme song performers: Band of Horses
68	8	"The Pharaoh's Wad"	October 30, 2011	608
Early becomes addicted to a video poker machine. Guest appearance: Riley Martin Theme song performers: Jason Isbell & the 400 Unit
69	9	"Return of Gaga Pee Pap"	November 6, 2011	609
A terminally ill Ga-Ga-Pee-Pap returns to make peace with his family before death, and also to "get them again" one more time. Theme song performers: The Jayhawks Guest appearance: Jesco White
70	10	"Trucked Up!"	November 13, 2011	610
After being challenged on his knowledge of trucking by Rusty, Early recounts his time as The Scrambler, a rebel trucker who took on trucking runs that "couldn't be done". They really couldn't: Dan Halen hired him to drive toxic waste from Dougal County to Paris, thereby dumping it into the Atlantic Ocean. Guest appearances: Riley Martin and Billy Joe Shaver Theme song performer: T-Pain

=== Season 7 (2012) ===
No. overall	No. in season	Title	Original release date	Prod. code	US viewers (millions)
71	1	"Rusty and Tammi Sitting in a Tree, B-A-S-T-A-R-D"	July 22, 2012	702	1.199
Months after the events of Keeping It in the Family Way, Rusty has to make a difficult decision if he wants to support the child he is about to have with Tammi. Guest appearance: Brendon Small Theme song performer: Elizabeth Cook
72	2	"Beware the Butt-Cutter"	July 29, 2012	701	1.140
When a serial killer is on the loose, Sheriff turns to the town’s stupidest citizen for help. Theme song performer: Yelawolf
73	3	"Squidbilly Manfishing"	August 5, 2012	704	1.157
Early gets plastic surgery to improve his self-esteem. Guest appearance: Bill Mondy Theme song performers: Lambchop
74	4	"Green and Sober"	August 12, 2012	703	1.081
Lil gets sober and moves out. Guest appearances: Paleface, Grey Revell, and Ellis Walden Theme song performers: Alabama Shakes
75	5	"The Legend of Kid Squid"	August 19, 2012	705	1.010
When Rusty takes the fall for Early’s crimes, Early becomes jealous of the attention that Rusty receives. Early then commits a crime that enrages the entire county. Guest appearance: Dave Stone Theme song performers: Gillian Welch and David Rawlings
76	6	"From Russia with Stud"	August 26, 2012	706	1.132
The sheriff gets a Russian mail-order bride, who promptly abandons him for a much more attractive man. Guest appearance: Billie Reaves Theme song performers: In Search of Sight

=== Season 8 (2013) ===
No. overall	No. in season	Title	Original release date	Prod. code	US viewers (millions)
77	1	"Granite Caverns"	August 11, 2013	801	1.226
Dan Halen's most recent business venture takes off when he advertises Rusty's chalk art as cave drawings created by ancient aliens. Guest appearances: Bradford Cox and Jared Swilley as themselves Theme song performers: Black Lips
78	2	"Ga-Ga-Ghost"	August 18, 2013	802	1.142
The ghost of Ga-Ga-Pee-Pap returns to bond with Early. Guest appearance: Jesco White as the ghost of Ga-Ga-Pee-Pap Cuyler Theme song performers: Lynyrd Skynyrd
79	3	"The Inkubator Lives!"	August 25, 2013	803	1.269
Rusty moonlights as a costumed vigilante called the Inkubator. Tammi urges him to focus on his job and pay his child support. Rusty stops his father from robbing Boyd's liquor store, and in the carnage, Boyd is left unconscious. Rusty is tempted by the cash in the open cash register, and takes it. He delivers the cash to Tammi, who rejects it, recognizing it is stolen. Guest appearance: Dave Stone
80	4	"Drone to the Bone"	September 8, 2013	804	1.196
Rusty gets recruited by the Army to pilot combat drones. Early and Granny explore the new residential neighborhood development near their home. The new neighborhood turns out to be a bomb testing site for the drones, and Early and Granny evade the drone strikes and fight back, destroying drone after drone. Rusty eventually realizes he is fighting his family and refuses to continue. Early helps Rusty hide in mud, stating he must stay hidden there until his enlistment term ends. Theme song performer: Unknown Hinson
81	5	"A Jailhouse Divided"	September 15, 2013	805	1.360
Denny challenges Sheriff for his job.
82	6	"Stop, Jammer Time"	September 22, 2013	806	0.863
A new judge sets out to punish lawbreakers. Guest appearances: Lavell Crawford as Judge Jammer, Ellis Walden as Judge Douglas Peppers Theme song performers: Shovels & Rope
83	7	"Thou Shale Not Drill"	September 29, 2013	807	1.004
The squids have a nuanced and well thought out debate on the controversial practice of fracture mining. Note: This is the second half-hour episode. Guest appearances: Ralphie May (credited under "Sweet Dick May") as P-Nut, Ellis Walden as fracturing boss Theme song performers: Blackberry Smoke
84	8	"The Squid Stays in the Picture"	October 6, 2013	808	0.946
A Hollywood studio is shooting a film in Dougal County. Early stumbles on the shoot, and is discovered by famous actor Tance Jackerman, who employs him as a consultant. Early teaches Tance his hillbilly ways. Theme song performers: Max Q
85	9	"Gun of a Son"	October 13, 2013	809	1.134
Early accidentally shoots Rusty while drunk, then blames his baby grandson Randy to evade responsibility. Guest appearances: Dave Hill and Joe Randazzo Theme song performers: Chuck Leavell and Francine Reed

=== Season 9 (2014) ===
No. overall	No. in season	Title	Original release date	Prod. code	US viewers (millions)
86	1	"Hetero-cephalo Agenda"	September 21, 2014	901	1.244
Early accidentally attends a pride parade in Atlanta, mistaking it for a celebration of Charlie Pride. At the parade, Early protests gay marriage, asking "what's next, you're gonna marry a paint can?" Granny eggs him on, and Early stages a wedding for himself and a paint can. Dan Halen supports Early on behalf of his "fundamentalist chicken restaurant, Chicken On the Cross", and tells Early to marry an Appalachian black bear. They organize a "straight pride" parade, culminating in Early marrying a bear. At the wedding Early reluctantly kisses the bear, and ultimately enjoys doing so, but nevertheless complains about the bears breath, prompting the bear to attack him. Later at the hospital, the bear is admitted because of spousal visitation rights, and attacks Early again. Theme song performer: Neko Case
87	2	"Limbitless"	September 28, 2014	902	1.395
Early attempts to break into a vending machine at work, and accidentally cuts off one of his arms in the process. Later, Early's limb grows back. Glen informs Early he won't receive worker's comp since his limb has grown back, so Early intentionally cuts his arm off again. He proceeds to continue intentionally maiming himself to scam Dan Halen for more money. Halen enlists Sheriff to gather evidence of Early's fraud. When Early explains the scam to Sheriff, Sheriff decides to cut off his own arm. Halen explains that the wire Sheriff wore proved his own fraud, and furthermore Sheriff is not a benefits eligible employee. Ultimately, Early's limbs stop growing back, and he is left with eight hooks. Early cuts off Lil, Granny, and Rusty's limbs, and asks Halen how much he'll pay him for those. Theme song performer: Dwight Yoakam
88	3	"Taint Misbehavin'"	October 5, 2014	903	1.207
Dan Halen is diagnosed with taint cancer which ultimately leads to adopting/converting Kemetism as his religion and building a pyramid. Guest appearances: Isaac Hayes III and Brendon Small Theme song performer: Todd Rundgren
89	4	"Ink Is Thicker Than Blood, Which Is Thicker Than Water"	October 12, 2014	904	1.412
Rusty questions his son's paternity, while Tammi dates Denny. Theme song performers: King Khan and the Shrines
90	5	"Bunker Down, You Hairy Dawg!"	October 19, 2014	905	N/A
Early builds a doomsday bunker and decides to bring down society to avoid paying for it. Theme song performers: Centro-Matic
91	6	"A Walk to Dignity"	November 2, 2014	906	1.077
Sheriff's father breaks the law to deconstruct social barriers. Guest appearance: Jesco White Theme song performers: Let's Active
92	7	"Granny Hotfoot"	November 9, 2014	907	1.025
After getting caught trying to steal apples, the Cuylers are forced into pig races. Theme song performers: The Milk Carton Kids
93	8	"Sheriff-in-law"	November 16, 2014	908	1.128
Early marries the Sheriff's invalid mother. Guest appearance: Ned Hastings Theme song performer: Jan Hammer
94	9	"Hybrid to Hell"	November 23, 2014	909	0.846
Early protests hybrid power by rolling coal in his truck-boat-truck. When it runs out of fuel, Rusty and the Sheriff take his truck to a used car dealer (hoping to get rid of it) and use the money to buy Early an electric car. Theme song performer: William Shatner
95	10	"Jose, Can You? Si!"	November 30, 2014	910	0.989
Early faces deportation... right after yelling at Hispanics to leave the USA. The Sheriff asks Early for a birth certificate and social security number but his mother (Granny) can't give him one because she gave birth to him in international waters while she was prostituting herself at Navy ships. Early is deported and returns to marry his mother in an attempt to regain citizenship. At the wedding and the end of the episode, one of the Hispanic men from the beginning tell the Sheriff that the marriage was unnecessary, because his mother is a citizen and therefore so is Early. Guest appearances: Todd Barry and Anthony "Citric" Campos Theme song performers: Pueblo Café

=== Season 10 (2016) ===
No. overall	No. in season	Title	Original release date	Prod. code	US viewers (millions)
96	1	"Lipstick on a Squid"	July 10, 2016	1001	1.167
Granny and Early enter a study for Pitchatentix, an erectile dysfunction drug. After reading Prosperity's handout about the drug's side effects (e.g. light emitting from all orafices), Rusty decides to stay in cosmetics with Devin, a college student who works at the testing facility. Rusty realizes there's no upside to switching to drug trials and points this out to Early. Guest appearances: Amber Nash as Prosperity and Tara Ochs. Theme song performer: Father John Misty
97	2	"Southern Pride and Prejudice"	July 17, 2016	1002	1.245
Early gets stuck in a symbol of his own oppression. Dan Halen bans the sale and display of the Confederate flag, angering the Cuyler family. Early joins EBISSE, the Esteemed Brotherhood of the Institute of Southern Self Esteem. Rusty discovers that squids were slaves in the old days in the South and tells Early. His father resists the truth at first, but eventually removes his Confederate flag tattoo on his face, telling the tattoo artist that it's racist. Note: This is one of the only 2 episodes banned from reruns and HBO Max, With the other one being “Blue Lives Battered”. Theme song performer: Kurt Vile
98	3	"Trackwood Race-ist"	July 24, 2016	1003	1.277
Early battles his grandson, Randy, in a Woody scout pine car derby. Early makes a truck-boat-truck car and Rusty makes a plain wooden car with sap clogging the wheels. Early beats Rusty during practice. Later that night, Rusty makes modifications to the car (which is against the rules). The next day, Rusty wins against half of the racers while Early beats the other half. The two Cuylers face off but Rusty wins when Early's cheating attempt fails. Despite winning by speed, Early wins by rule because a hot dog piece that he told Granny to shoot hits his truck-boat-truck by accident. In the end, everyone gets a trophy and a pizza and Early storms out saying "Goshdam millennials!" Guest appearance: Dave Hill Theme song performer: The B-52's
99	4	"The Peep"	July 31, 2016	1004	1.231
Sheriff relives a fond memory of trying to become a comedian. After getting some advice, he tries stand-up again at a local bar, only to nearly end his career as a policeman.
100	5	"Vicki"	August 7, 2016	1005	1.116
One of Sheriff's old classmates makes the mistake of returning to Dougal County. Theme song performer: Sharon Van Etten
101	6	"Cephalo-ectomy"	August 14, 2016	1006	1.196
Randy is bullied at school because of his squid tentacles. Early and Granny teach Randy how to use his tentacles to fight back. The next day, Randy violently hurts two bullies by ramming his tentacles up their butts and through their mouths. This leads to fear in the school and Tammi tells the three Cuylers that she's talked to the doctor about surgically removing Randy's squid parts. This surprises them and Early asks Tammi for 24 hours to show her that Randy is a good squid. He teaches Randy how to get out of work, to disobey orders, to rob Boyd's store, and demonstrates squirting ink when angry. When Randy fails to squirt ink at a cardboard cutout of Bill Clinton, Early and Granny become indifferent and tell Rusty to "let his mama cut off them wigglers...He ain't one of us." Rusty and Randy leave and Rusty tells Tammi that she's right, surgery is the best option, but she informs him that the surgery is too expensive for her to afford. Wanting to provide for his son, Rusty steals one of his father's trucks and sells it online. Unfortunately, Randy's surgery doesn't help anything as his tentacles grow back. Early wakes up and calls the Sheriff to search for his truck. Deputy Denny shows up driving the truck, revealing that he bought it online. Early and Denny argue and draw their guns, causing Sharif to draw two pistols. A Mexican standoff ensues, with no one shooting. Denny explains (after a lot of yelling) that Rusty sold the truck to him online but Early refuses to believe it. Rusty walks up and reveals that he actually did, saying "because I'm a squid: I steal, I don't take orders from nobody." Early tells his son that he's proud of him, knowing "you was always a good squid." Taking advantage of the distraction, Denny rides off in the truck, hoping to keep it. Early, Rusty, and Randy follow. Denny leaps out of his house with his pistols drawn just as Early is breaking into his truck. Randy sprays ink all over Denny, then inserts his tentacles up Denny's butt and through his mouth, then beats him. This makes the other two squids happy until blood starts pouring. Early drives the three of them home. Theme song performer: Rebecca Schiffman
102	7	"Greener Pastor"	August 21, 2016	1007	1.232
Early gets drunk and argues with a peaceful goateed stranger at the Waffle Barn. He injures himself by walking in front of a car, preventing the two from fighting each other. Early appears in church the next day, bandaged in multiple places, and brags about beating up the stranger, forcing him to buy him dinner and drive him home, none of which is true. Then the stranger steps to the front of the church and introduces himself as Kyle Nubbins, the new pastor, saying the reverend had left to go to "a better place....First Presbyterian of Blue Ridge." Kyle then plays his guitar and invites the church's congregation to a potluck in the evening. Early and Granny talk to each other at home about their dislike for Nubbins at home. At the potluck, Early accuses Kyle of being "pissed off" about losing the Waffle Barn fight the night before and throws food on the ground while cursing and insulting Nubbins. He leaves, taking food for himself when the Sheriff intervenes. Later on, the Cuylers show up to the church's fundraiser and Early dunks Nubbins in a tub of water without throwing the ball at the target, then points his sawed-off shotgun at Nubbins. Kyle quietly talks to Early, saying he understands Early's anger and instability and that alcohol won't help him. Early is baptized, then reveals that he hasn't changed as he steals all the fundraiser money. In church, Nubbins tells the congregation to close their eyes and allow the thief to return the money. When they open their eyes, however, not only did Early not return the money, he also steals Kyle's guitar. This reveals an ugly side of the pastor, cursing when he realizes that his "12 string" is gone. Nubbins walks up on Early, who is playing the guitar and singing at the Cuyler house. Early camoflouges himself, but forgets that his hat and the guitar reveal his position. Kyle rams Early against the wall and begins to choke him. The two calm down and meet in the church gym for a pushing contest in Sumo wrestler suits, which is Early's idea. However, Rusty (in the legs of the Cuyler suit) walks backwards, out of the circle. Sheriff tearfully tells Early that Early has to leave town, as he promised, but Early refuses, saying "I love this town with all of my heart, and it would take a 220 sasquatch to drag me from this town." The Sheriff then straps Early to a dog, which drags him away. Nubbins (apparently satisfied) walks off, saying to the crowd "We'll see you in church." Guest appearance: Jason Isbell as new reverend Kyle Nubbins Note: This episode was dedicated to the memory of the late Scott Hilley, who voiced The Reverend in the series. Theme song performer: Jimmy Cliff
103	8	"Squash B'Gosh"	October 30, 2016	1008	0.888
Jealousy sparks industry sparks grave robbery sparks the apocalypse. Theme song performers: Cannibal Corpse
104	9	"Thanks-Taking"	November 20, 2016	1009	0.834
Rusty's new friend Biscuit (Billie) is invited to Thanksgiving dinner. Early and Granny try teaching the duo about the Cephalo-Indian War, or the 27-Minute War as it's also called. Theme song performers: The Both

=== Season 11 (2017) ===
No. overall	No. in season	Title	Original release date	Prod. code	US viewers (millions)
105	1	"Dove in an Iron Cage"	October 15, 2017	1101	0.932
When Boyd is found murdered, the Sheriff pins Rusty for the crime. Guest appearances: Jason Isbell as Rev. Kyle Nubbins, Tony Guerrero, Isaac Hayes III, and JD McPherson as a group of prisoners, Edward Hastings as the judge. Theme song performer: Steve Earle Note: This is the third half-hour episode. Jean, Paul, Alice, Jailbot, and Jacknife from Superjail! all make cameos in the episode.
106	2	"The Guzzle Bumpkin"	October 22, 2017	1102	0.890
Rusty becomes a stuntman for an energy drink company. Guest appearances: Jason "Wee Man" Acuña and Coolio as themselves, Elizabeth Cook as Tammi, Brendon Small Theme song performer: Bob Mould
107	3	"Jacksonville Jackass"	October 29, 2017	1103	0.837
While at a football game, the Sheriff drinks his first adult beverage and becomes intoxicated, causing chaos to ensue. Guest appearance: "Action Plan" Tim Andrews
108	4	"The Knights of the Noble Order of the Mystic Turquoise Goblet"	November 5, 2017	1104	0.876
Early and the Sheriff investigate a conspiracy centering on Dan Halen and a secret order. Guest appearance: Lucky Yates, unlisted.
109	5	"Ballad of the Latrine Marine"	November 12, 2017	1105	0.756
Early develops a habit of breaking into women's bathrooms under the guise of chasing out other men. Unfortunately, his manhood is soon put to the test when he becomes pregnant. Guest appearances: Billy Wayne Davis
110	6	"Debased Ball"	November 19, 2017	1106	0.936
Early becomes a minor league baseball mascot. Guest appearances: Elizabeth Cook as Tammi, Casey Motter as baseball announcer
111	7	"Tortuga de Mentiras"	November 26, 2017	1107	0.873
Nubbins misleads Early about a volunteer retreat in Guatemala, prompting the squid to trail them for revenge. Theme song performer: "Weird Al" Yankovic
112	8	"Duel of the Dimwits"	December 3, 2017	1108	0.866
When the patriarch of the Cuylers' neighbors passes away, the two families fight over the land where he's buried. Theme song performer: John Prine
113	9	"The War on The War on Christmas"	December 10, 2017	1109	0.749
A Winter Solstice festival sparks religious fanaticism from Early.
114	10	"Dewey Two-ey"	December 17, 2017	1110	0.835
Continuing where "Duel of the Dimwits" left off, Dewey Jr. makes Early's life miserable in ways that include tricking him into opening a taqueria mere feet from his own made before marrying Granny.

=== Season 12 (2019) ===
No. overall	No. in season	Title	Original release date	Prod. code	US viewers (millions)
115	1	"Forever Autumn"	August 11, 2019	1201	0.538
Dan Halen's foolish new plan prompts Early to open an even more foolish new business.
116	2	"Galvin"	August 11, 2019	1202	0.482
Granny finds love and Early loses his mind.
117	3	"Muscadine Wine"	August 18, 2019	1203	0.568
Early and Tammi start a band in a star-studded episode that got us a free cruise. Note: This is the fourth half-hour episode.
118	4	"The Reenactment of the Repulsion of the Siege of Cuyler Mountain"	August 25, 2019	1204	0.584
Early finds a priceless civil war relic and sells it for the right price.
119	5	"Rich Dan, Poor Dan"	August 25, 2019	1205	0.502
Dan Halen finds financial bankruptcy less enjoyable than moral bankruptcy.
120	6	"Cooler-Heads Prevail"	September 8, 2019	1206	0.605
Early enjoys the highfalutin lifestyle of owning a premium cooler.
121	7	"Blue Lives Battered"	September 8, 2019	1207	0.539
A social media stunt nearly costs Sheriff his life. Note: This is one of the only 2 episodes banned from reruns and HBO Max, with the other one being “Southern Pride and Prejudice”.
122	8	"There's Sucker Porn Every Minute"	September 15, 2019	1208	0.579
Early lets his beak flag fly. Theme song performer: Shooter Jennings
123	9	"Events by Russell"	September 15, 2019	1209	0.519
Early interferes with Rusty's new party business, leading to a last call for action.

=== Season 13 (2021) ===
No. overall	No. in season	Title	Original release date	Prod. code	US viewers (millions)
124	1	"One Man Banned"	November 7, 2021	1301	0.233
Early is banned from Ballmart.
125	2	"Let 'er R.I.P."	November 7, 2021	1302	0.195
Rusty works at a morgue.
126	3	"No Space Like Home"	November 14, 2021	1303	0.305
Early recalls memories of his childhood at the run-down storage locker Ga-Ga-Pee-Pap raised him in.
127	4	"Scorn on the 4th of July"	November 14, 2021	1304	0.236
Early fakes veteran status to obtain various discounts.
128	5	"Zen and the Art of Truck-Boat-Truck Maintenance"	November 21, 2021	1305	0.213
Early takes up yoga, only to go mad with power.
129	6	"Who-Gives-a-Flip?"	November 21, 2021	1306	0.152
Sheriff's home is burglarized by Early despite his purchase of an expensive security system, sending him into a deep depression when his most prized possession is stolen.
130	7	"Ol' Hootie"	December 5, 2021	1307	0.228
130	7	"Ol' Hootie"	December 5, 2021	1308	0.228
Dougal County is terrorized by a gigantic owl. Note: This is the fifth and final half-hour episode.
131	8	"The Liceman Cometh"	December 12, 2021	1309	0.297
Early's love of hats faces a reckoning when it causes a massive lice outbreak in Dougal County.
132	9	"This Show Was Called Squidbillies"	December 12, 2021	1310	0.272
Granny's death leads to a Cuyler family fracture when Rusty decides to marry Tammi and move away.
