= The Onion Movie =

- DVD cover
- Directed by: James Kleiner
- Written by: Todd Hanson; Robert D. Siegel
- Produced by: Gil Netter; David Miner; David Zucker; Michael Rotenberg
- Starring: Len Cariou; Larissa Laskin; Scott Klace; Steven Seagal; Sarah McElligott
- Cinematography: Maryse Alberti; Neil Shapiro
- Edited by: Frederick Wardell
- Music by: Asche & Spencer
- Production companies: Regency Enterprises; ZUCKER-NETTER Productions; 3 Arts Entertainment
- Distributed by: 20th Century Fox Home Entertainment
- Release date: June 3, 2008
- Running time: 80 minutes
- Country: United States
- Language: English

The Onion Movie (released in some countries as News Movie) is a 2008 satirical American comedy film written by The Onion writers Robert D. Siegel and Todd Hanson. It was filmed in 2003 and released on June 3, 2008, direct-to-video. It is Rodney Dangerfield's final film role, prior to his death in October 2004.

== Premise ==
The plot revolves around a fictitious Onion television news anchorman, Norm Archer (Len Cariou). He is forced to face a corporate takeover by Onion's perennial multinational, Global Tetrahedron. The media conglomerate is interrupting Archer's newscasts with product placement commercials for 'Cock Puncher', the company's action movie franchise, which is a 'whap right in the nutsack' for the veteran newsman. Onion news is described as "fair and balanced". The plot is a springboard for various comedy sketches featuring The Onion's satire. Vignettes include music videos parodies of Britney Spears ['Take Me From Behind' 'isn't sexual at all. It's about love sneaking up on you...like...you know... from the behind.' 'Down on my Knees' 'is about how like, when you have a big crush on a boy, sometimes you get down on your knees and, like, beg for their love.' 'Lollipop Love' 'is the kind of love that is just really sweet and you just kind of want to lick it, you know, and suck it. Like a lollipop.' 'Shoot your Love All Over Me' 'That's about how, like, when you're in love you just wanna be covered in it.'] and Steven Seagal parodying the action hero genre he normally portrays as the world famous 'Cock Puncher'. The plot is interrupted by film reviewers and commentators weighing in on its progress, with one threatening an immediate walkout of all African American audience members unless a positive portrayal of an African American is inserted into the plot.

== Cast ==
- Len Cariou as Norm Archer
- Larissa Laskin as Dana Dobbs
- Scott Klace as Kip Kendall
- Steven Seagal as Cock Puncher
- Sarah McElligott as Melissa Cherry
- Brendan Fletcher as Tim, White Black Guy
- Richard Fancy as Kenneth Garber
- Murphy Dunne as Raymond Marcus
- Alex Solowitz as The Masses
- Paul Scheer as Dirk, Bates Computer Salesman
- Nick Chinlund as Bryce Brand
- Jim Rash as Bryce's Manager
- Jed Rees as Wizard Proteus
- Greg Pitts as Wizards Dragonmaster
- Greg Cipes as Hippie Diplomant
- Yevgeni Lazarev as Slovesevic
- Adam Gregor as Birajko
- Ahmed Ahmed as Ahmed
- Kevin Federline as Lollipop Love Dancer
- Robert Hoffman as Lollipop Love Dancer
- Jen Cohn as Cooking Show Host
- Meredith Baxter as Chef On Cooking Show
- Chrissy Metz as Heavy Girl
- Erik Stolhanske as Producer
- Michael Bolton as himself
- Rodney Dangerfield as himself
- Sal Lopez and Jay Montalvo as Peruvians
- Daniel Dae Kim as Mystery Party Goer (Ivy Leaguer)

== Production ==
In 2003, New Regency Productions and Fox Searchlight Pictures were on board to produce and release a movie written by The Onion staff. Tentatively titled The Untitled Onion Movie, it was to be directed by music video director Tom Kuntz and Mike Maguire and written by then Onion editor Robert Siegel and writer Todd Hanson with the rest of the Onion staff. After delays and previews to test audiences, the film was suspended and eventually dropped by Fox. New Regency Productions continued the project.

On March 15, 2007, Scott Aukerman said that the Onion movie was at a "dead standstill". Additionally, Onion, Inc. President at the time, Sean Mills, indicated The Onion was no longer associated with the film project.

In November 2007, then-President Sean Mills told Wikinews that the film was a dead project. Although Fox Searchlight had an option to release it on DVD, there was no immediate announcement to do so. Eventually, the trailer appeared on the DVD for The Darjeeling Limited. The trailer also appeared on The Comebacks, Hitman, Charlie Bartlett, and Aliens vs. Predator: Requiem DVDs.

20th Century Fox Home Entertainment released The Onion Movie DVD on June 3, 2008. The UK release's packaging styles the film News Movie, a.k.a. The Onion Movie.

== Reception ==
The Onion's own non-satirical entertainment website The A.V. Club did not review the film. The site's film critic Nathan Rabin explicitly declined to review the film for his "Dispatches from Direct to DVD Purgatory" feature on poor-quality direct-to-DVD films because he wished to avoid a conflict of interest.
