= The Future Is Unknown =

Studio album by Unknown Hinson
- Released: 1999; March 28, 2004 (reissue)
- Genre: Country; comedy; rock
- Label: Uniphone; Capitol Records (reissue)
- Producer: Unknown Hinson

Unknown Hinson chronology
21 Chart-toppers (1999)	The Future Is Unknown (1999)	Rock n Roll Is Straight From Hell (2002)

Professional ratings
Review scores
Source	Rating
AllMusic	3/5 stars

The Future Is Unknown is an album by Unknown Hinson. It was released in 1999 by Uniphone Records. It was re-issued in 2004 by Capitol Records.

== Critical reception ==
AllMusic wrote: "Now and then, [Hinson] moves from twangy country to rock rhythms and screaming guitar solos, if only to send up rock culture ('Hippie Girl', 'Rock 'n Roll Is Straight From Hell'). It's all in fun, and there are some excellent candidates for the Dr. Demento radio show, even if this isn't the most original comedy around." Country Standard Time called it "a triumph of character-based satire."

== Track listing (Uniphone) ==
All tracks composed by Unknown Hinson

1. Venus Bound
2. I Make Faces (When I Make Love)
3. Desert Luau
4. In the Trunk of My Cadillac Car
5. Man to Man
6. Closer to the Light
7. Don't Bite the Lips that Kiss You
8. Foggy Windows
9. Silver Platter
10. Put Out or Get Out
11. Sweet Pain
12. Hippie Girl
13. My Heart's on the Line
14. Fish Camp Woman (Live)
15. Pregnant Again
16. Rock 'n' Roll is Straight from Hell
17. Don't Look at Me
18. Theme from "The Unknown Hinson TV Show" (Instrumental)

== Track listing (Reissue) ==
All tracks composed by Unknown Hinson

1. I Ain't Afraid of Your Husband - 1:30
2. I Make Faces (When I Make Love) - 3:58
3. Polly Urethane - 3:32
4. Hippie Girl - 4:03
5. Your Man... - 3:01
6. Lingerie - 3:11
7. Venus Bound - 3:34
8. Foggy Windows - 2:48
9. I Cleaned Out a Room (In My Trailer for You) - 2:51
10. Man to Man - 3:37
11. Peace, Love and Hard Liquor - 3:16
12. Pregnant Again - 2:15
13. I Quit All That Mess - 3:24
14. Rock 'N Roll Is Straight from Hell - 2:46
15. Unknown Hinson Theme (Instrumental) - 0:51

== Personnel ==
- Unknown Hinson - all instruments
