= Todd Hanson =

American writer and actor

- Born: October 10, 1968 (age 57)
- Occupations: Writer, voice actor

Todd Hanson is an American writer and voice actor, notable for his work as a writer and editor at the parody newspaper The Onion. He also voices the character Dan Halen on the Adult Swim program Squidbillies.

== Career ==
=== As writer ===
Todd Hanson briefly attended the University of Wisconsin-Madison in 1986 and soon dropped out. He remained in Madison and began working a series of menial jobs. Eventually Hanson began drawing a semi-autobiographical cartoon entitled 'Badgers and Other Animals' which was published regularly in The Daily Cardinal, a university student newspaper. Hanson was working as a dishwasher when he first started as a writer and cartoonist at The Onion. He wrote an article in The Onion that was optioned as a movie by DreamWorks and co-wrote the comedy film The Onion Movie (2008), which he has since disowned.

=== As actor ===
Todd was an ensemble member in the Ark Improvisational Theater in Madison, Wisconsin from 1987 to 1988. He voices the character Dan Halen on Squidbillies. He made three guest appearances in the episodes of Aqua Teen Hunger Force called Interfection, Hypno-Germ and Last Dance for Napkin Lad. He is also on the commentary for Aqua Teen Hunger Force Colon Movie Film for Theaters in which he stated that he is a big fan of the show. The commentary also states that he came up with the Chicken Bittle character which was rejected to be an Aqua Teen for several years.

== Personal life ==
Hanson has lived in Wisconsin and New York City, New York. During a storytelling segment on Public Radio International's The Moth, Hanson credited his mother for him being "a douchebag".

Hanson spoke candidly about his long history of depression on the July 7, 2011 episode of WTF with Marc Maron. In the interview, Hanson discussed attempting suicide in 2009 and recognizing that his humor was a defense mechanism against seeking help.

== Filmography ==
Year	Title	Role	Notes
2003	Space Ghost Coast to Coast	Writer	1 episode
2002–2011	Aqua Teen Hunger Force	Writer	3 episodes
2005	The Aristocrats	Actor/Himself	Staff of The Onion
2008	The Onion Movie	Writer	
2005–2021	Squidbillies	Dan Halen	55 episodes
2009	Ape Trouble		Video
2009	Something Extremely Important		
2010	The People vs. George Lucas	Actor/Himself	
