= Squidbillies =

American adult animated sitcom (2005–2021)

- The Cuyler family. From the left: Rusty, Granny, Early and Lil.
- Genre: Adult animation Animated sitcom Satire; Surreal humour Black comedy
- Created by: Jim Fortier; Dave Willis
- Voices of: Unknown Hinson (2005–19); Tracy Morgan (2021); Daniel McDevitt; Dana Snyder; Patricia French; Charles Napier (uncredited; 2005–06); Bobby Ellerbee (2006–21); Todd Hanson; Scott Hilley (2005–14); Pete Smith
- Narrated by: Dave Willis (select episodes)
- Music by: Billy Joe Shaver various artists
- Composers: David Lee Powell; Shawn Coleman
- Country of origin: United States
- No. of seasons: 13
- No. of episodes: 132 (list of episodes)

Production
- Executive producers: Keith Crofford; Mike Lazzo
- Producers: Jim Fortier; Dave Willis; Ned Hastings; Phil Samson; Alan Steadman; Melissa Warrenburg
- Running time: 11 minutes 22 minutes (episode 60)
- Production company: Williams Street

Original release
- Network: Adult Swim
- Release: October 16, 2005 – December 12, 2021

Related
- Anime Talk Show; Carl's Stone Cold Lock of the Century of the Week

Squidbillies is an American adult animated sitcom created by Jim Fortier and Dave Willis for Cartoon Network's late-night programming block Adult Swim. An unofficial pilot for the series aired on April 1, 2005. The series later made its official debut on October 16, 2005, and ended on December 12, 2021, with a total of 132 episodes over the course of 13 seasons.

The series follows the Cuylers, an impoverished family of anthropomorphic hillbilly "mud squids" living in the Georgia region of the Blue Ridge Mountains. The series revolves around the exploits of Early, a lazy, ornery alcoholic and frequent criminal. Early's son, Rusty, is good-natured and eager for his father's approval. The eldest Cuyler, Granny, is very old and has many health problems, but nevertheless is quite resilient. Lil, Early's sister, is a hairdresser, sex worker, and meth cook who is often found unconscious in a pool of her own vomit. Early's friend, Sheriff, is the friendly, incompetent sheriff, often tasked with arresting Early. Early's employer, Dan Halen, is a diabolical robber baron.

The series also airs in syndication in other countries and has been released on various DVD sets and other forms of home media.

== Setting and premise ==
Squidbillies follows the exploits of the Cuyler family and their interactions with the local populace, which usually results in a fair amount of destruction, mutilation, and death. Despite their many crimes, the Cuylers often go unpunished by their bumbling friend, Sheriff (born Sharif). The Cuylers are some of the last individuals of a federally protected endangered species, the "Appalachian mud squid". They live in the fictional Dougal County in the North Georgia mountains. Dougal County is impoverished, with little amenities or industry, save for the exploitative Dan Halen Sheetrock International. The show often satirizes the history and culture of the American South, including the Lost Cause, slavery, religious fundamentalism, segregation, political conservatism, bigotry, racism, and poverty. In the words of The New York Times, the show takes "backwoods stereotypes" and turns them into "a cudgel with which to pound maniacally on all manner of topical subjects."

== Production ==
Squidbillies was created by Dave Willis, co-creator of Aqua Teen Hunger Force, and Jim Fortier, previously of The Brak Show, both of whom worked on the Adult Swim series Space Ghost Coast to Coast. The show was animated by Radical Axis until 2012, with Awesome Inc taking on animation duties until the show's conclusion.

=== Concept and development ===
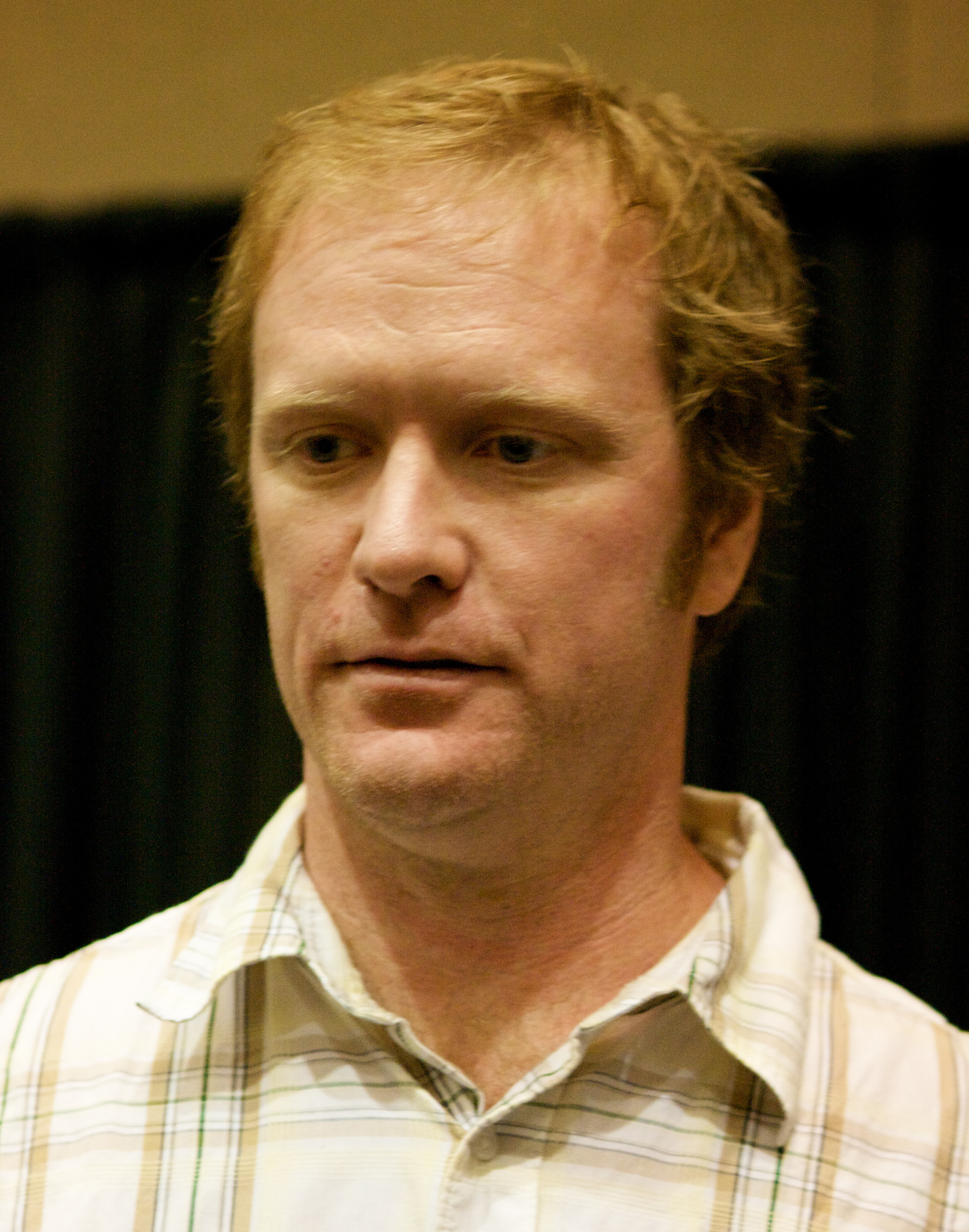
Dave Willis

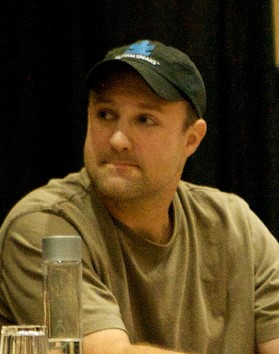
Jim Fortier

The series has its origins in 2003, when Mike Lazzo, former vice president of Adult Swim, asked to develop a project around the title Squidbilly's, about which he speculated during a conversation with his colleagues about Hanna-Barbera's Squiddly Diddly character. In July of the same year, Matt Maiellaro and Pete Smith produced the first script of the pilot episode, but it was scrapped, and over 35 scripts were written by Maiellaro, Smith, Dave Willis, Jim Fortier, Matt Harrigan, and Mike Lazzo over the course of a year. Later, Lazzo approved and commissioned a screenplay by Dave Willis and Jim Fortier, who decided to base the plot and related characters on the stories of the two creators who both grew up in Conyers, Georgia. According to vice president Keith Crofford, development of the first season was delayed due to a lack of ideas, revealing that the pilot episode was scheduled to air in December 2004. The original budget of the pilot episode was about $1100.

On March 25, 2004, the series was announced to be in production with a first season consisting of seven episodes planned. Adult Swim later showed short clips from the first episode during San Diego Comic-Con and Dragon Con in 2004. The series was announced as in development with as many as 96 episodes, that the pilot episode would air on November 7, 2004, and that the official broadcast would take place in January 2005. On November 4, 2004, three days before the pilot episode was scheduled to air, the animated special Anime Talk Show aired, featuring future Squidbillies star Early Cuyler, along with Meatwad from Aqua Teen Hunger Force and Sharko from Sealab 2021, who are interviewed by Space Ghost. The special was later placed as a bonus feature on the first DVD volume of Squidbillies. The pilot episode was heavily promoted to air on November 7, 2004. On that date, however, Adult Swim decided to air the first episode of Perfect Hair Forever unannounced due to the incompleteness of the Squidbillies episode.

In March 2005, Adult Swim announced that a six-episode first season would air from September of that year alongside 12 oz. Mouse and Perfect Hair Forever. An unfinished version of the pilot episode aired on April Fool's Day, later revealed by a bumper that it would be completed in five weeks. On October 16, 2005, after being posted on the official website two days earlier, the episode aired alongside the rest of the season.

=== Writing ===
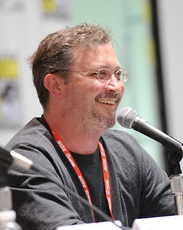
Matt Maiellaro contributed to the development of the pilot episode of Squidbillies, occasionally writing for the series.

The series was written primarily and entirely by Jim Fortier and Dave Willis, who are sometimes aided by other writers such as Casper Kelly and Will Shepard, who send their scripts to the creators. Other producers or animators occasionally took part and wrote additional story elements, including Matt Harrigan, Matt Maiellaro, Pete Smith, and Lear Bunda. In 2016 longtime show producer, Alan Steadman also became a regular writer on the series.

The delay in production of the pilot episode was partly the result of a lack of ideas on the part of the writers, who had subjected it to multiple rewrites between the commission of the series and its actual scheduled debut. Over 35 screenplays were written by Maiellaro, Smith, Willis, Fortier, Harrigan, and Mike Lazzo in the course of a year. Originally, the names of the protagonists Early and Rusty were to be Arvee and Donny, respectively, but they were changed by Smith and Fortier in an attempt to renew the creators' original ideas. During the development of Squidbillies, the creators also working on the development of Perfect Hair Forever, inserting and moving some concepts and characters between the two animated series.

=== Animation ===
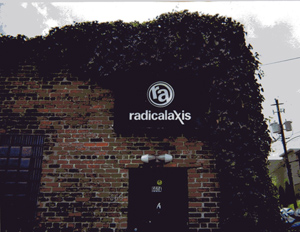
Radical Axis provided animation for the series through season six.

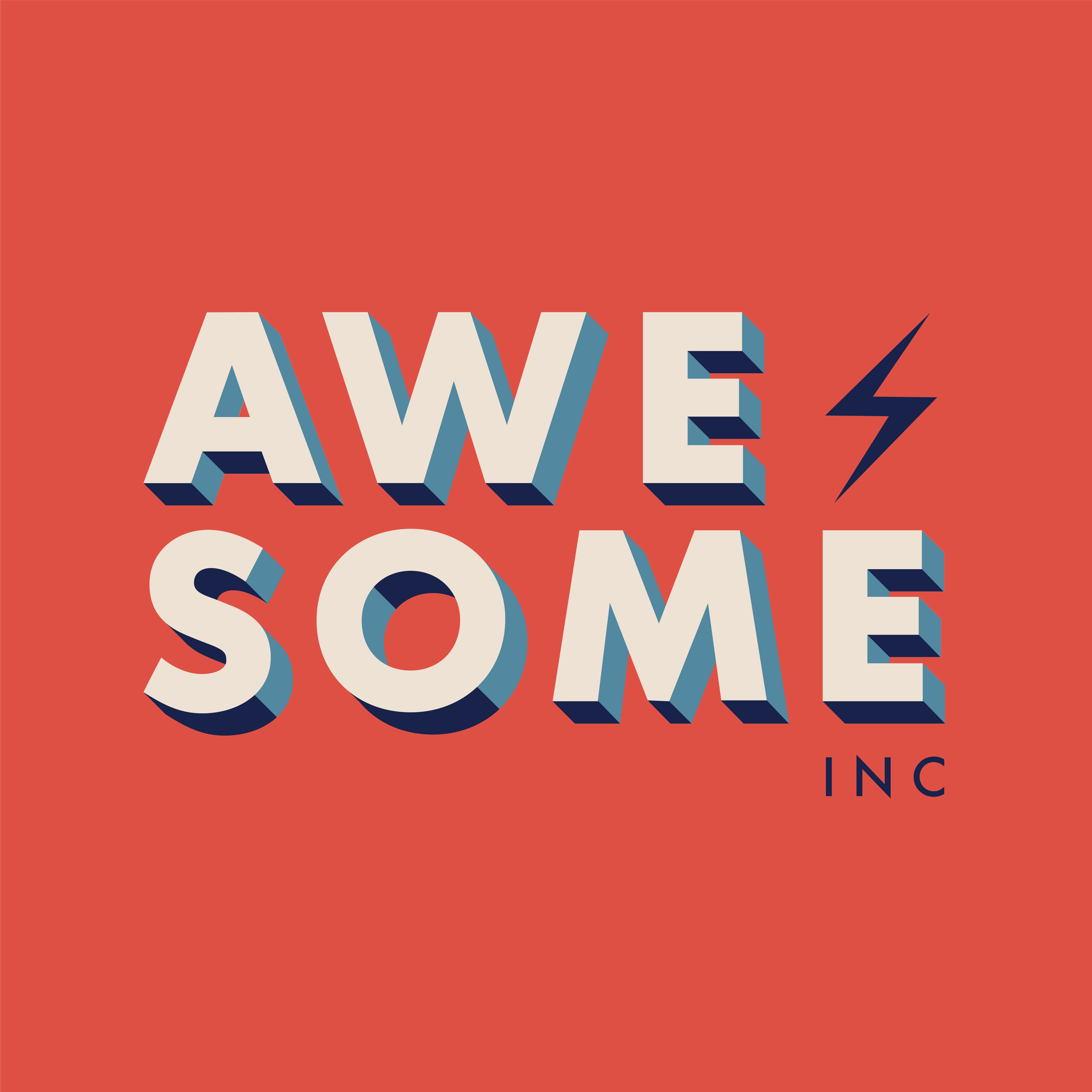
Awesome Inc animated the series from seasons seven to 13.

The series' animation, described by Willis as Beavis and Butt-Head style, is based on Adobe Flash and takes a week to complete. The main software adopted for the series' animation is Macromedia Shockwave Flash, which allowed in later seasons to more easily change the resolution format to render the broadcast in high definition. An average episode took about 700 working hours to complete.

Until the sixth season, the task of animating the various scripts and characters was entrusted to Radical Axis, while from the seventh onwards to Awesome Inc. The reason why the characters are drawn so crudely was not due to the budget, which was still substantial compared to that of their previous work Space Ghost Coast to Coast, but was by design; in fact, according to Jim Fortier, if the series had been drawn differently, therefore cleaner and sharper, it would not have been fun.

Production times for animation and various changes made to episodes could take up to eight weeks. Unlike traditional series, no storyboards or particular animations were produced, and the preproduction product was not sent abroad to be further modified; in fact, the production took place exclusively in Atlanta, with between five and seven animators. According to animator Alex Barrella, by the 12th season, animations and episode designs were generally completed in a few weeks to a maximum of a month, before being revisited and saved. After being animated, the episodes were edited with Adobe After Effects for the final composition. Regarding subsequent seasons, Barrella stated that he wanted to resume the style of "the first three seasons of Aqua Teen Hunger Force", to increase the irreverent tone of the series.

=== Wallpapers ===
The series' backgrounds and colors were created by artist Ben Prisk at Primal Screen in Atlanta. According to Mike Lazzo, who supervised Prisk's work, he wanted to base his backgrounds on folk art. Together with Fortier and Willis, Prisk worked about a year and a half to develop the animation style of the backgrounds, trying to adapt them to the previously designed characters according to line widths, layers, and texture complexity. The backgrounds were characterized by the lack of right angles and confusing perspectives. Prisk's works were created in acrylic, revisited with gouache and spray paint, and finally composed on Adobe Photoshop. Each wallpaper took around 12–15 hours to process and complete.

=== Voice cast ===
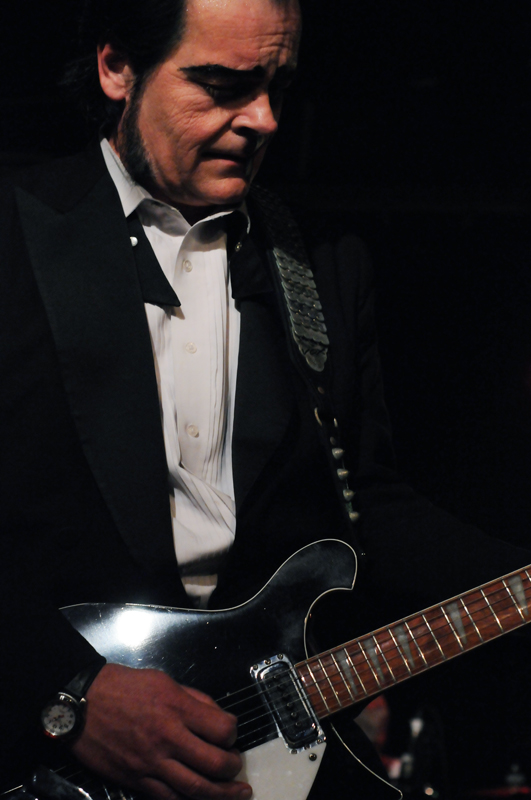
Country musician Unknown Hinson voiced lead character Early Cuyler until his firing in 2020

- Unknown Hinson (2005–2019) and Tracy Morgan (2021) as Early Cuyler
- Daniel McDevitt as Rusty Cuyler
- Dana Snyder as Granny
- Patricia French as Aunt Lil
- Charles Napier (2005–2006) and Bobby Ellerbee (2006–2021) as Sheriff
- Todd Hanson as Dan Halen
- Scott Hilley (2005–2014) as Reverend
- Elizabeth Cook (2011–2014; 2017–2021) and Faye Otto (2016) as Tammi
- Jason Isbell as Reverend Nubbins
- Dave Willis as Deputy Denny and Glenn
- Pete Smith (2005–2016) as Boyd

==== Dismissal of Unknown Hinson ====
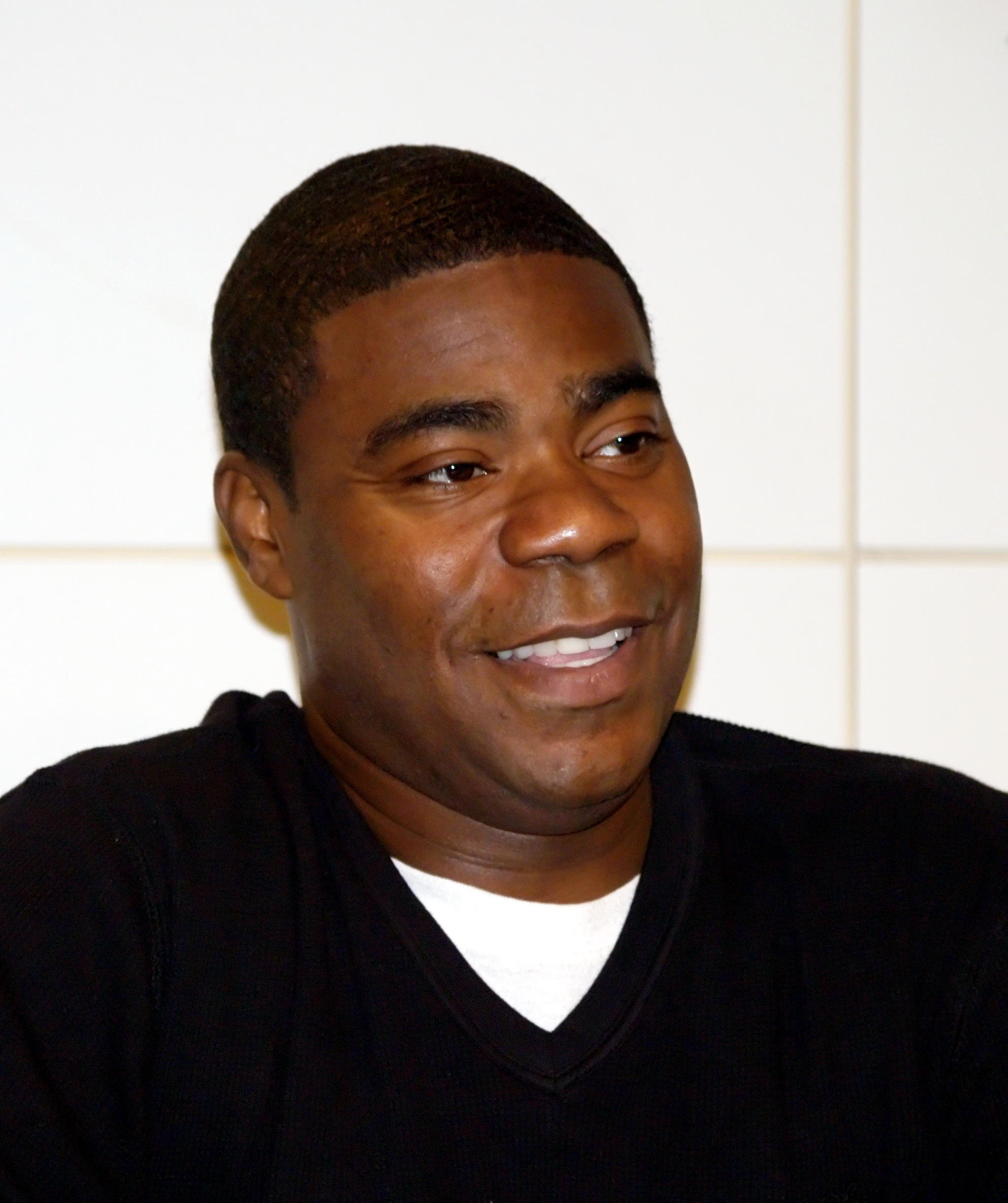
Tracy Morgan voiced Early during season 13.

On August 16, 2020, Unknown Hinson was fired from the series for controversial comments towards the Black Lives Matter movement and country singer Dolly Parton. A response was posted on Facebook by Hinson, claiming that being fired from Squidbillies ruined his life. The response was later deleted. The 13th and final season of Squidbillies premiered on November 7, 2021, with Hinson being replaced by comedian Tracy Morgan.

== Episodes ==
Series overview
Season	Episodes	Originally released	
Season	Episodes	First released	Last released
1	6	October 16, 2005	November 20, 2005
2	14	September 17, 2006	December 24, 2006
3	20	January 20, 2008	June 8, 2008
4	10	May 17, 2009	July 19, 2009
5	10	May 16, 2010	July 18, 2010
6	10	September 11, 2011	November 13, 2011
7	6	July 22, 2012	August 26, 2012
8	9	August 11, 2013	October 13, 2013
9	10	September 21, 2014	November 30, 2014
10	9	July 10, 2016	November 20, 2016
11	10	October 15, 2017	December 17, 2017
12	9	August 11, 2019	September 15, 2019
13	9	November 7, 2021	December 12, 2021

== Release ==
=== International broadcast ===
In Canada, Squidbillies previously aired on Teletoon's Teletoon at Night block and later G4's Adult Digital Distraction block. The series currently airs on the Canadian version of Adult Swim.

=== Home releases ===
Season		Episodes	Volume	Release date	Extras
Season		Episodes	Volume	Region 1	Extras
1	2005	6	1	October 16, 2007	"How I Make The Damn Show!"; The Original Pilots; Deleted Scenes; Behind the Scenes Footage; Audio commentaries; Anime Talk Show
2	2006	14	1	October 16, 2007	"How I Make The Damn Show!"; The Original Pilots; Deleted Scenes; Behind the Scenes Footage; Audio commentaries; Anime Talk Show
3	2008	20	2	April 21, 2009	"Squidbillies Circle Jerk 2: Return Of The Self Congratulation"; "Dragonbillies"; "Funny Pete Stuff"; "Art and Music"; "Dragon Con 2008"; Audio commentaries
4	2009	10	3	July 6, 2010	"Art & Music"; "This Ain't A Hat, It's A Rag-top for A Sex Convertible"; "Funny Pete Stuff"; "Dragon Con 2009"
5	2010	10	4	June 21, 2011	Behind the Scenes of "America: Why I Love Her"; Jesco White Voice Record Outtakes; Dragon Con Squidbillies Panel; XM Radio Squidbillies 4 July Special; Squidbillies Tattoo Contest Video
6	2011	10	5	August 7, 2012	Behind the Scenes Featurettes; "Trucked Up II: Glenn's Revenge" bonus digital video episode; Art+Music feature and more
7	2012	6	6	March 17, 2015	None
8	2013	9	6	March 17, 2015	None

The series is also available on HBO Max since September 1, 2020. However, seasons 1–12 were removed from the platform in 2023. These seasons are expected to return to the streaming service soon, with "Gimmicky Magazine Show Spoof Parody About Dan Halen" returning to its regular fit-to-screen format.

=== Soundtrack ===
In January 2012, a free 35-track soundtrack was released on the Adult Swim music site entitled The Squidbillies Present: Music for Americans Only Made by Americans in China for Americans Only God Bless America, U.S.A.

Another album, entitled Squidbillies Double Platinum Gold, was released on vinyl in July 2019.

== See also ==
- List of Squidbillies episodes
- Pacific Northwest tree octopus
