= Unknown Hinson =

American singer-songwriter

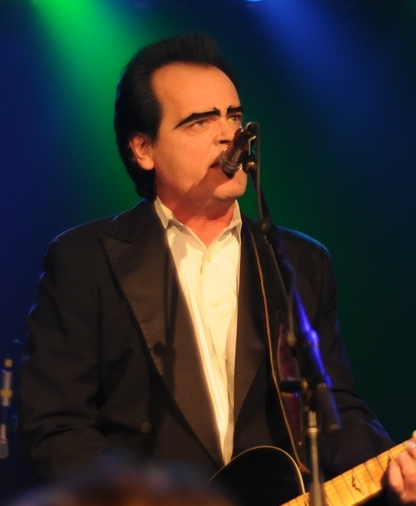
- Unknown Hinson performing in 2010

Background information
- Born: Stuart Daniel Baker; November 7, 1954 (age 71)
- Origin: Albemarle, North Carolina, U.S.
- Genres: Rockabilly; country; psychobilly
- Occupations: Musician; songwriter; voice actor
- Years active: 1992–2023
- Labels: Uniphone, Capitol, Coffin Case
- Formerly of: The Boxmasters

Stuart Daniel Baker (born November 7, 1954), known by his stage name Unknown Hinson, is an American singer, musician, songwriter, and voice actor. He was the longtime voice of Early Cuyler in the adult animated sitcom Squidbillies from 2005 to 2019.

== Biography ==
Stuart Daniel Baker, a music teacher and studio musician from Albemarle, North Carolina, created his alter-ego for The Wild Wild South, a Charlotte-area public-access program that featured comedy sketches and concert footage. Baker and co-star Don Swan played the characters of Unknown Hinson and Rebel Helms, respectively. After Swan's death in 1995, Baker created The Unknown Hinson Show, a direct spin-off of The Wild Wild South. The Unknown Hinson Show won Creative Loafing Charlotte's "Best Of" poll for Best Public-Access Television Show four years in a row. After the series ended, Baker continued in his role as Unknown Hinson, performing live concerts and releasing several recordings.

== Career ==
=== Live performing career ===
Hinson has performed with many notable rockabilly, country, and psychobilly acts such as The Reverend Horton Heat, Marty Stuart, Hank III, and Ed King. Hank III, grandson of Hank Williams, has Hinson's face tattooed on his bicep. In late 2008, working under the name Danny Baker, Hinson was hired to play bass as well as lead guitar in Billy Bob Thornton's band The Boxmasters. For this gig, Baker appears without the familiar Unknown Hinson wardrobe and makeup, instead appearing in a vintage '60s suit, white shirt, and black pencil tie. His manager and booking agent was his wife, Margo Baker.

According to a November 10, 2012 post on his Facebook page, Hinson decided to quit touring after 17 years. He cited rising costs and indicated his plans to find something new to do. After the death of his wife, Margo Baker, Unknown Hinson resumed touring again.

On June 3, 2020, Baker announced on his Facebook page that he would not be playing any more shows due to osteoarthritis. On July 17, 2023, he announced on his Facebook page that he was recovering from two strokes and undergoing physical therapy.

=== Recording career ===
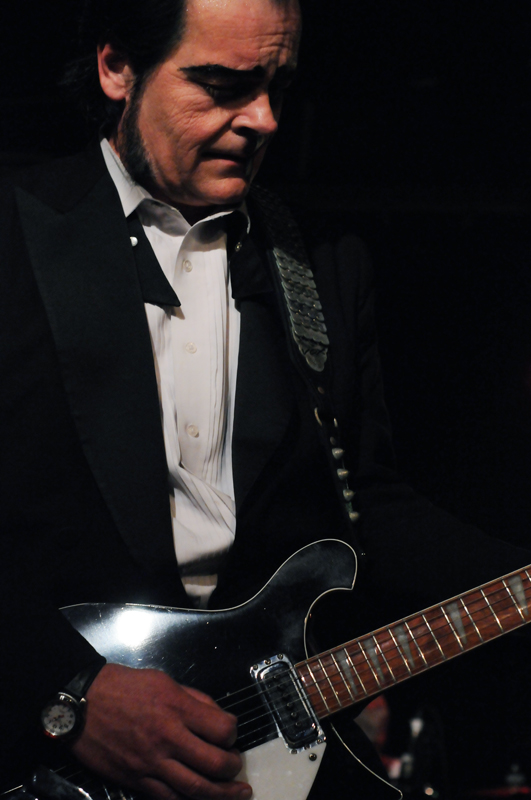
Hinson in 2009

Unknown Hinson wrote his own music, and produced all of his own recordings. His music often parodied the dark elements of contemporary country and redneck culture. In early 2009, Hinson's "Torture Town" won in The 8th Annual Independent Music Awards and Vox Pop vote for Best Alternative Country.

=== Voice acting career ===
Hinson, credited as Baker, provided the voice of Early Cuyler, a balding hillbilly squid from Georgia, on Cartoon Network's late night Adult Swim program Squidbillies for 15 years.

== Controversy ==
On August 13, 2020, Baker received backlash after posting comments about Dolly Parton, calling her a "bimbo" and "slut" on his Facebook page in response to a recent news article concerning Parton's support of the Black Lives Matter movement. Baker subsequently posted a response to those who were upset, telling liberals to "unfriend" him and telling them to have fun "forsaking your own race, culture, and heritage."

The producers of Squidbillies fired Baker from the series over his remarks. Reverend Guitars of Ohio abruptly stopped marketing their Stuart Baker signature series guitars on August 14, 2020, and posted "we are no longer associated with Unknown Hinson. We have stopped production on his guitars and we have removed him from our website."

== Works ==
=== Discography ===
Year	Album	Label
1999	The Future Is Unknown	Uniphone Records
2002	Rock 'N' Roll Is Straight from Hell (Promo Release)	Capitol Records
2002	Rock 'N' Roll Is Straight from Hell (Main Release)	Capitol Records
2004	The Future Is Unknown (Re-Release)	Capitol Records Nashville
2004	Selections from the Future Is Unknown (Promo Release)	Capitol Records Nashville
2005	21 Chart Toppers (Promo Release)	No Label
2006	Target Practice	Coffin Case Records
2008	Live and Undead	Uniphone Records / sdb Music
2012	Reloaded	Uniphone Records / sdb Music
2012	The Squidbillies Present Music for Americans Only Made by Americans in China for Americans Only God Bless America, U.S.A. (Note: Credited on this album as both Unknown Hinson and Early Cuyler, the character he voiced on Squidbillies)	Williams Street Records
2020	Live and Undead II	Uniphone Records

=== Filmography ===
Year(s)	Production	Role(s)	Other notes
2004	Anime Talk Show	Early Cuyler	TV special
2005–2019	Squidbillies	Early Cuyler	Lead
2010	Carl's Stone Cold Lock of the Century of the Week	Early Cuyler	Guest, 1 episode
