= List of Archer characters =

This is a list of characters on Archer, an American animated spy comedy television series created by Adam Reed for the FX network.

== Characters ==
Cast of Archer
Character	Voice actor	Season														
Character	Voice actor	1	2	3	4	Vice	6	7	Dreamland	Danger Island	1999	11	12	13	14	Into the Cold
Sterling Archer	H. Jon Benjamin	Main	Main	Main	Main	Main	Main	Main	Main	Main	Main	Main	Main	Main	Main	Main
Cheryl Tunt	Judy Greer	Main	Main	Main	Main	Main	Main	Main	Main (Note: As Charlotte Vandertunt.)	Main (Note: As Charlotte Stratton.)	Main	Main	Main	Main	Main	Main
Mitsuko Miyazumi	Judy Greer		Main	Main	Main	Main	Main					Main				
Cyril Figgis	Chris Parnell	Main	Main	Main	Main	Main	Main	Main	Main	Main (Note: As Siegbert Fuchs.)	Main	Main	Main	Main	Main	Main
Lana Kane	Aisha Tyler	Main	Main	Main	Main	Main	Main	Main	Main	Main (Note: As Princess Lanaluakalani.)	Main	Main	Main	Main	Main	Main
Malory Archer	Jessica Walter	Main	Main	Main	Main	Main	Main	Main	Main	Main	Main	Main	Main			
Pamela "Pam" Poovey	Amber Nash	Recurring	Main	Main	Main	Main	Main	Main	Main (Note: As Detective Poovey.)	Main	Main	Main	Main	Main	Main	Main
Dr. Algernop Krieger	Lucky Yates	Recurring	Recurring	Recurring	Recurring	Main	Main	Main	Main (Note: As Aaron Leibowitz.)		Main	Main	Main	Main	Main	Main
Krieger Clones	Lucky Yates					Main					Guest					
Crackers	Lucky Yates									Main		Guest				

== Sterling Archer ==
Sterling Malory Archer (H. Jon Benjamin), Code Name: Duchess, is 184 lb, 6'2", 36 years old (computer-screen readout in the show's first episode) and has black hair and blue eyes. He is considered the world's most dangerous secret agent. Though he shows proficiency in stereotypical spy skills—weapons, driving, martial arts—his primary interest in the job is the opportunity to enjoy a jet-setting lifestyle full of sex, alcohol, thrills, lacrosse, fast cars, designer clothing, and spy toys.

Egotistical and self-serving, Archer generally lacks empathy towards anyone, though he is very quick to call out others for perceived bigotry. He shares many of his mother's flaws such as alcoholism, selfishness, impulsive behavior, and the stubborn refusal to listen to anyone. Flashback sequences show that his mother, between her career as an international spy and her social promiscuity, had very little time for Sterling in his youth. As such, Archer was primarily raised by his valet Woodhouse, whom he abused both verbally and physically.

He is almost always seen with an alcoholic drink. He insists that he has an incredibly high tolerance for alcohol yet is commonly seen in an inebriated state. He wears only hand-tailored suits to the office, and often refuses to wear anything other than black turtlenecks (which he calls "tactilenecks") during operations. He claims he was the first to recognize the garment's tactical potential, and becomes enraged when his style is copied by other agents. His sidearm of choice is the Walther PPK (the same weapon used by James Bond) despite being consistently insulted due to the gun's diminutive stature by his co-workers (Ray Gillette: "You'd better put that back in your purse," Conway Stern: "Oh, I'm queer, coming from the man whose tiny gun came with a matching purse"). In the season three episode "Drift Problem," he receives a modified black Dodge Challenger as a gift from Malory Archer, but she has the car stolen from him hours later in an effort to teach Archer a lesson about taking care of his possessions. In recent episodes he is seen driving a black Chevrolet El Camino.

Although Archer has a high kill rate, having stopped and killed a number of highly dangerous criminals, he usually does so not out of a desire to uphold the law, but for his own personal selfish reasons. He has, however, demonstrated compassion for others on occasion: in "Placebo Effect" he genuinely cared about fellow cancer patient Ruth, and was upset over her death, vowing vengeance against the mobsters who were selling phony chemotherapy medication; in "Double Trouble," Archer attempts to stop Katya Kasanova and Lana from fighting, as he doesn't want them to hurt each other. Archer admits to Lana in Season 3 that she is his only friend, and later suggests that his feelings for her go beyond physical attraction. At the conclusion of Season 4, Archer voluntarily drowns himself to save Lana after learning she is pregnant, confessing his love to her in the process (he is resuscitated moments later). He shows surprising levels of concern throughout Lana's pregnancy, going so far as to become a certified Doula to help her through labor. He has shown great affinity towards large felines, such as ocelots and tigers, but fears large reptiles, in particular alligators and crocodiles. He has also displayed a heavy dislike of cyborgs/robots, possibly stemming from a childhood incident in which he nearly lost his testicles to a vacuum cleaner (which he was using to simulate fellatio).

Despite his numerous personality flaws, he is undeniably an exceptionally gifted operative who doesn't hesitate to throw himself into dangerous situations. This is shown during his escape from Moscow, when he repeatedly outwits and outfights the soldiers pursuing him, despite numerous injuries. When he is finally cornered in an elevator, he blindfolds himself and fully intends his last words to be, "Fuck you, you douchebags." Though he claims not to have a death wish, Archer is clearly a thrill-seeker and an adrenaline junkie. He revels in activities such as skydiving, and driving powerful automobiles, sometimes joking that such things give him, "a giant erection."

Much of Archer's success can be attributed to luck. He confesses to Rip Riley (Patrick Warburton) in Season 3 that he's not big on planning and explains that his methods are more, "organic". When asked to explain his actions, he demonstrates in-depth knowledge of the tactics and capabilities of whatever enemy he is facing and near perfect situational awareness. When Archer sustains amnesia at the beginning of Season 4, believing himself to be someone else, he is still able to instinctively fend off a Russian hit squad, and detect the holes in Lana Kane's story while she attempts to restore his memory.

A recurring joke on the show is Archer forgetting his pre-planned witty one-liners, swearing, "I had something for this," before uttering something pithy such as, "suck grenade, stupids!" Archer also has an intense fascination with actor Burt Reynolds. He often quotes lines and re-enacts scenes from Reynolds' many films, often asking Lana if he resembles his idol.

His encyclopedic knowledge of various subjects allows him to make clever and obscure references on a moment's notice (e.g., "Lana, you'd better call Kenny Loggins 'cause you're in... the Danger Zone!" or referencing the Herman Melville short story "Bartleby, the Scrivener", or saying "Who are you, Horace Greeley?" to someone complaining about him "burying the lede", or the former American ice hockey player Mike Eruzione, referencing Eruzione's participation in the United States' famous win over the Soviet Union). However, he is often ignorant or forgetful when it comes to broader concepts such as helium not being inflammable, or that Barry's status as a cyborg renders him nigh-impervious to many conventional forms of attack. He also loudly declares to everyone he meets that he is a secret agent, and insists that keeping such information under wraps negates the whole purpose of being a spy in the first place.

Rival agents consider Archer a serious threat, due in part to his combat skills and his instinctual fieldwork, which tends to be devoid of any kind of preparation on his part (he proudly claims to have never read a dossier). Because of this, Archer is equally likely to successfully kill a room full of enemy agents as he is to accidentally cause an international incident.

Archer and other characters have noted that he exhibits numerous symptoms of autistic spectrum disorders. This includes his emotional development issues (though evidence strongly suggests this is his mother's fault), his near encyclopedic knowledge of trivia, mission-relevant information, and the things that specifically scare him (such as alligators and crocodiles). In addition, he possesses a savant-like ability to count the number of bullets remaining in his and others’ guns, including multiple automatic weapons in a firefight. Oftentimes, when stating such facts, another character will ask him, in surprise, "How do you know that?", to which Archer incredulously will reply, "How do you NOT?". In Season 4, Archer admits that his uncanny ability to do this may, indeed, be evidence of autism. There is some ambiguity as to Archer's academic success. Photos show that he graduated from college, but flashback sequences show him struggling with written exams. In the Season 4 episode "Once Bitten", it is revealed that Archer had, at one time, received an offer of full athletic scholarship to Johns Hopkins University to play lacrosse (though he was shot in the stomach by a crazed stalker before he accepted). Shortly thereafter, it is then revealed that he had poor SAT scores.

After ISIS is shut down by the FBI, Archer joins the quest to sell a tonne of cocaine. He also tries to win over Lana, going so far as to get Kenny Loggins to play at her baby shower only to be dismayed when he discovers Lana never understood his repeated "Danger Zone" references. When Lana gives birth, she admits that she used sperm from Archer to get pregnant, making him the father. He is initially angry at Lana for using his genetic material without his consent, but comes to genuinely care for his daughter despite having a loose grasp of parental responsibility. He and Lana re-enter into a committed relationship halfway through Season 6.

== Lana Kane ==
Lana Anthony Kane (Aisha Tyler) was the top female agent at ISIS (prior to its disbandment) and Archer's girlfriend. Lana has dark brown hair, green eyes, and a signature look consisting of short cowl necked sweater dresses and black thigh-high stiletto suede boots. She also has abnormally large hands for a woman, which are a frequent target for ridicule.

A tall, beautiful black woman, she is a competent and deadly agent but is constantly frustrated that she is treated as the number two ISIS field agent because Archer's mother runs the agency. Like Archer, Lana is an expert in Krav Maga, in which all ISIS agents undergo training, and is usually seen carrying two Tec-9 submachine guns in shoulder holsters (she is so proficient with these that she can write letters in cursive with one magazine). She drives a purple car that resembles a Living Daylights-era Aston Martin V8 Vantage. Lana also has incredibly large and strong hands, which have been (usually mockingly) likened by Archer and other characters to cricket bats, steam shovels, and the "Truckasaurus" to her ever-mounting frustration.

Before Lana was an agent, she was an animal-rights activist; at a protest, she tried to throw red paint on Malory's fur coat but was stopped when Malory pulled a gun on her. While the other protesters ran, only Lana stayed and stood her ground even with a gun pointed at her. Lana's fearlessness so impressed Malory that she offered Lana the chance to become an agent. Her parents, Claudette and Lemuel, are academics at UC Berkeley who were unaware of her career in espionage for years, believing her to be a doctoral student in Environmental Science at Columbia. Her liberal leanings do occasionally show, and she tends to be the most politically correct character on the show, as well as the "straight man" to the antics of the rest of the staff. However, she is shown to be as capable of questionable behavior as the rest, once charging every man in the ISIS office $600 to say they slept with her as a way to get revenge on her cheating ex-boyfriend Cyril, and on another occasion holding up a firefight on a space station until the other agents conceded her breasts are still perfect. Furthermore, in a moment of surprising insight, Cheryl accused Lana of being a hypocrite as her history as a social activist is not enough to drive her away from ISIS, which is deep down her only true love. She is also prone to extreme acts of unnecessary violence, such as giving Cyril, whom she was dating at the time, a black eye for merely implying that she might have been jealous of a rival agent.

Lana has a complex love/hate relationship with Archer, with whom she had a long-term relationship that she ended six months prior to the start of the series due to his constant philandering and psychological issues resulting from Malory's parenting. She regularly trades insults with him and consistently berates him for his chaotic methods in the field, but at times she has shown sympathy when he is in trouble or been attracted to him in moments of competence. In "Stage Two" she tried to counsel him through his cancer scare, and in a drunken state of fear he admitted he loved her, a statement that rendered her speechless. She slept with him prior to his surgery, but after his cancer was treated he was unable to say it again. He later admitted in "Heart of Archness" that she was his only friend, but was not able to repeat his confession of love until he nearly died saving her life in "Sea Tunt II". She acknowledged his sentiment, but does not confess her own affection for him until after the birth of her daughter in "Arrivals/Departures". Lana and Archer maintain a professional rivalry throughout the series, both claiming to being the best agent, while openly belittling each other’s skills.

Lana reveals her pregnancy at the end of Season 4, with the biological father being a donor and not Cyril, who she had briefly resumed dating earlier in the season. After ISIS is disbanded, Archer proposes marriage to Lana but she declares she'd rather lose the baby than let it be raised by Archer. She reluctantly goes along with the plan to form a drug cartel in order to provide for her child. As the season progresses, she is surprised by Archer's high level of sympathy and interest in her pregnancy, Lana eventually gives birth to a daughter, Abbiejean, and reveals to a stunned Archer that she used frozen sperm samples from him to make him the father. He reacted to this revelation by fleeing halfway around the world and going on a six-week long bender. Later in the series Archer and Lana re-enter into a committed relationship halfway through Season 6.

In flashbacks, she is shown sporting an afro, a hairstyle that, according to Archer, made her look "like Angela Davis had a love child with Sweet Lou Dunbar." She eventually straightened her hair and grew it long enough to wear it in a tied back flip hairstyle. In season seven, she began wearing a hair weave, which she does not like the others noticing.

=== Archer: Dreamland ===
In Archer: Dreamland, Lana is first seen as the featured lounge singer at Mother's nightclub, "Dreamland". It is later revealed she is actually an undercover agent with the Treasury Department investigating Dreamland, who gets caught up in the Vandertunt kidnapping plan. Lana is killed after being shot several times by Mother and Poovey.

=== Archer: Danger Island ===
In the Danger Island story, Lana is portrayed as Princess Lanaluakalani, a princess of Mitimotu's indigenous population and a native of the island which is under French control.

=== Archer: 1999 ===
In the 10th season, Lana is the co-captain and co-pilot of the MV Seamus.

== Malory Archer ==
Malory Archer (Jessica Walter) is Sterling Archer's mother and the former head of ISIS. She is a self-centered alcoholic who regularly hatches half-baked, invariably disastrous schemes to use the agency's resources to her own personal advantage. These schemes include staging a false assassination attempt on a U.N. official to secure a lucrative government contract, a fake bomb threat to get a luxury cabin on a "cruise" aboard a rigid airship, and a fake assassination attempt to get reservations at a luxury restaurant. Nearly the entire action of the episode "Lo Scandelo" takes place in her vast and luxurious New York apartment.

Malory has blue eyes and gray hair that was originally black, characteristics she shares with her son. She is almost always seen wearing a gray Chanel suit. Greedy, short-sighted, racist, homophobic and materialistic, Malory has gone so far as to haggle ransom prices for her employees and has little concern for others. Her blatant racism causes friction between her and Lana Kane, Sterling's on-and-off-again love interest. In "Killing Utne" and "Skytanic" she carries out a grudge against her rival/neighbor Trudy Beekman.

In the second season, it is revealed that she was an aspiring actress during World War II, when she was recruited into the OSS by Wild Bill Donovan. During her days as a black-ops spy she had clandestine trysts with KGB head Nikolai Jakov (an affair that lasted 40 years), rival spy agency ODIN's boss Len Trexler, and jazz drummer Buddy Rich. She is not sure which one fathered her son, and told Sterling that his father was John Fitzgerald "Black Jack" Archer, an ace pilot who was posthumously awarded the Navy Cross. A fourth candidate, an Italian anti-fascist rebel murdered by the government, was mentioned in "Lo Scandalo."

Malory was a highly inattentive parent, sending Sterling to boarding school for 15 years and leaving him stranded in a train station one Christmas Eve because she failed to inform the school she was moving. Malory demonstrated some of her parenting techniques, heavy on punishment, when she babysat the Wee Baby Seamus in "The Double Deuce." Malory believes in corporal punishment; she frequently spanked her young son with a wooden spoon and this object is still a "huge emotional trigger" for the now-grown Archer. In various flashbacks, Malory is shown to have been a highly capable field agent in her younger days. Like her son, she was proficient at the practical things such as martial arts and firearms. She is shown to have been a merciless killer and at some point wore an eyepatch for as-yet-unexplained reasons. Her personal choice of sidearm is a .44 Magnum revolver, calibrated with a laser sight and scope in the present day.

Malory and her son have a very dysfunctional relationship. There is little affection on either side but due to her position, Malory has kept Sterling almost entirely dependent on her. However, there are occasions when Malory has shown concern for Sterling: in "Job Offer" she was jealous when he left to join ODIN, and when she realized she had drunkenly issued a burn notice on him, she became distraught at the possibility that this—and she—might have gotten him killed. In "White Nights" she pleaded with Nikolai Jakov not to kill Sterling; whether this is genuine concern for her son's well-being or just her inability to cope without him being totally dependent on her is unclear; either one is possible. Despite their tumultuous relationship, Malory stayed in the hospital every day while awaiting for Archer to awaken from his coma. It is shown that deep down, Malory loves Sterling, but obviously does not show it.

Malory is also shown to be incredibly sex-driven, and dated numerous different men over several decades (sometimes at the same time), while hitting on numerous others, often just to reap their worth; this fact routinely frustrates Archer. She has had to use ISIS resources repeatedly to acquire various sex tapes she made in her younger days. She once claimed to have married a war hero who died when Archer was young, it was revealed to be a ruse to hide the fact that Archer's fatherhood is unknown, and Malory remained unmarried for the first three seasons. At the beginning of season 4, however, Malory has married Ron Cadillac (voiced by Jessica Walter's real-life husband, Ron Leibman), the owner of the top Cadillac dealership in the tri-state area.

Malory carries multiple grudges since World War II, treating her apartment building's Irish maintenance man horribly on the grounds that Ireland didn't help the Allies during the war. After shooting at the Yakuza boss in "Drift Problem" she claims it was payback for the Japanese attack on Pearl Harbor. In "The Honeymooners", she refers to the Dunkirk evacuation when arguing with a French waiter. In "Lo Scandelo" she carries on a 30-plus-year affair with the prime minister of Italy but ends up murdering him after revealing that he may have killed Sterling's father decades earlier during a protest.

In the fifth-season premiere, an FBI raid reveals to the rest of the team that ISIS was never sanctioned by the U.S. government and Malory has been running illegal missions for years. Malory manages to work a deal to keep everyone from going to jail and living off her hidden bank accounts (naturally, she never warned anyone else to keep their money). She then decides to use a metric ton of cocaine ISIS had confiscated to set up a drug cartel, noting "how hard can it be [...] if Mexicans can do it?" Her scheme leads to the end of her relationship with Ron, who loses patience with the criminal lifestyle, although they eventually reconcile. Malory also takes on managing Cheryl in her country music career. It is eventually revealed that Malory has set up the entire venture as a ploy to sell drugs for the CIA, and is able to leverage her team a position as a sanctioned outsourced organization in Season 6.

In the twelfth-season finale, Malory retires and leaves the agency to Archer. She is last seen relaxing on a beach with Ron Cadillac (who had been absent from the show since Leibman's death in 2019). This ending was written specifically following Jessica Walter's death in March 2021, after she had finished recording her lines for the season.

Lovers

Malory's lovers are numerous, and extensive. Through seasons 1–7 we are told about the numerous lovers of Malory Archer. In the first season she flirts with: Nikolai Jakov, Lord Feltchley, Conway Stern, Torvald Utne, Captain Lammers, and Len Trexler. In the second season, she is seen to flirt with Conrad Schlotz, Len Trexler, Dr Speltz, and The Gay Duke. In the third season she flirts with Rip Riley, Burt Reynolds, Savio Mascalzone, and Commander Drake. In season 4, she flirts with and marries Ron Cadillac, she also flirts with Giancarlo Corelli. In season 5, she continues to flirt with Ron, she flirts with Tony Foti briefly, and attempts to flirt with Calderón however this is not reciprocated. After she marries Ron Cadillac, her flirting is heavily reduced. We can say that she has slept with Nikolai Jakov, Len Trexler, Buddy Rich, Rip Riley, Savio Mascalzone, Ron Cadillac, and one anti-fascist rebel who is visually similar to Archer. We also know that she has slept and/or dated with several more men including the doctor that treated young Sterling Archer's genitals after they were damaged by a vacuum cleaner, and they went on a date, to a 'thing' pretty heavy on "Negroes and jazz". Due to her substantial number of lovers, the father of her child Sterling Archer is unknown.

=== Archer: Dreamland ===
In Archer: Dreamland, Malory is simply known as "Mother" and is the owner of the nightclub "Dreamland" with a henchman named Zerk, and a rival mobster to Len Trexler. When Archer seeks information on who killed his partner, Woodhouse, he gets caught up in Mother's mob war with Trexler.

=== Archer: Danger Island ===
Danger Island casts Malory as the owner of a fancy hotel on the island who also employs Archer as the pilot of a sightseeing plane she operates on the side.

=== Archer: 1999 ===
In 1999, Malory portrays the Seamus' holographic AI avatar, referred to simply as "Mother". While she often takes the form of Malory Archer wearing a highly stylized futuristic pantsuit ensemble, for moving quickly between parts of the ship (or simply to prank/fluster the flesh and blood members of the crew), she can transform into a roughly volleyball sized digital construct and zip quickly through and away from the scene.

== Cyril Figgis ==
Cyril Figgis (Chris Parnell) is the comptroller of ISIS. Cyril is portrayed as quite competent at his job but is plagued by a number of personal issues that are often worsened by being a prime target of Archer's spite and disdain. He was Lana Kane's love interest at the beginning of Season 1, but due to residual trust issues from her relationship with Archer, she refused to call Cyril her boyfriend or say she loved him.

Cyril is a mild-mannered, nebbish intellectual. He is homely and chops supper vegetables in his office. Cyril is extremely knowledgeable and resourceful. In "The Figgis Agency," it is revealed Cyril has a B.A. in criminal justice and a JD. Cyril is also so remarkably well-endowed that it is apparently a physical impairment, leading him to put in a claim for "penis ensmallment" surgery, as Pam and Cheryl are shocked to learn when they hack into the company's medical records. It is implied this characteristic provides him with many opportunities to indulge his sexual addiction. Lana broke up with him after she caught him with Framboise (the former head of HR at ODIN whom Archer calls "the Pelé of anal").

In season 2, Cyril's mother is dead and "Tragical History" reveals that he had a dysfunctional relationship with his father, an elementary-school superintendent. His grandfather was friends with both Frank Sinatra and Peter Lawford.

Despite his many talents, Cyril is woefully clumsy and inadequate as a field agent (and anywhere else where guns are concerned). In "El Secuestro", he injured Brett Buckley after erroneously thinking a gun's safety was on. In Season 3, Cyril is promoted to field agent to replace Ray Gillette, who is temporarily using a wheelchair. While Archer and Lana ridicule this decision due to Cyril's supposed lack of proficiency at most things, Cyril displays cleverness and quick thinking when he devises a cover story after being captured by a Colombian drug cartel. He ingratiates himself with their boss and is able to maintain a convincing cover to infiltrate their organization and engineer Archer and Lana's escape. He has proven to be poor in firearms skills: on multiple occasions he has accidentally killed valuable targets who had been subdued. Cyril's ineptitude with firearms prompts Lana to sometimes make allusions to Barney Fife. Although it turns out that Gillette hasn't been disabled and has resumed field work, Cyril occasionally accompanies Archer on field missions.

Cyril and Lana resumed dating in Season 4, although Lana often appeared to have reservations about it. Still insecure in his relationship with Lana, and egged on by Pam, Cyril shadowed Lana and Archer while they were on a mission posing as honeymooners, which may have prompted Lana to pursue artificial insemination. When the team goes to the Vatican to prevent an assassination attempt on the Pope, Cyril fakes a crippling phobia to religious garb in order to avoid going on the mission so as not to endure further abuse from Archer. He was enraged by Lana's revelation in the season finale that she is pregnant and that he is not the biological father and spitefully says "three cheers for little Johnny bastard".

When ISIS is disbanded in season 5, Cyril talks about going back to his career as a defense attorney and is annoyed that Lana doesn't remember him talking about it in the past. He also opines that another career path would likely be boring compared to working at ISIS. During the team's ensuing attempts to sell cocaine, Cyril provides a practical financial viewpoint on their schemes but is little more than a liability in the disastrous attempts to find buyers. By the episode "Filibuster", however, he has deposed Gustavo Calderone as dictator of San Marcos and, intoxicated with absolute power, has Archer imprisoned. His reign as dictator is short, however, as he is soon forced to flee the nation with his friends when American forces invade the country.

In Season 6, Cyril is frustrated when Lana and Archer not only resume dating but also manage to maintain a somewhat healthy and functional relationship. Cyril continues to privately pine for Lana, offering to babysit for AJ while Lana attends a survival camp. Though while she slept, he confessed he had intentions of sleeping with her. In a desperate bid to stop her from going on a romantic date with Archer, he confesses he loves her. He does experience feelings of regret when he conspires with Pam, Cheryl, and Krieger to have Katya Kazanova seduce Archer in an effort to break up Archer and Lana.

In addition to being a competent lawyer, accountant, and field agent, Cyril has also shown proficiency at piloting as he was the only member of ISIS who performed well on the spacecraft simulator (season 3), and he later piloted the miniaturization submarine when Ray was once again crippled (season 4). In Season 7, he is the CEO and founder of the Figgis Detective Agency, much to Archer's annoyance, though Cyril agreed that once Archer meets the legal requirements, he'll turn ownership over to him.

In Season 11, Cyril is revealed to have become more fit and muscular in the three-year period Archer was in a coma, to which Archer, possibly out of jealousy, accuses of being as the result of performance-enhancing drugs. In the more properly-functioning ISIS, Cyril also conducts the briefings on missions.

=== Archer: Dreamland ===
In Archer: Dreamland, Cyril becomes Detective Figgis, a corrupt Los Angeles police detective who is secretly working for Len Trexler.

=== Archer: Danger Island ===
In the 9th season of the show Cyril becomes Siegbert Fuchs, a Nazi spy who undercover as a local businessman to plots against Archer to find the Island's treasure, which he aims to buy from his lover, Princess Lanaluakalani.

=== Archer: 1999 ===
During the 10th season of the show, Cyril is a part of the Seamus crew (generally acting as an engineer) who has a relationship with Lana.

== Cheryl Tunt ==
Cheryl Tunt (Judy Greer, speaking; Jessy Lynn Martens, singing, Archer Vice) is Malory's mentally unstable secretary. She has blue eyes and auburn hair (almost always worn in a bun).

In the pilot episode, she was portrayed as a lovesick, ditzy secretary whom Archer frequently took advantage of, before that side of her character was gradually phased out as her behavior became more and more unhinged. In the series' first four episodes she regularly changed her name, going by Carol, Carina, and Cristal, responding to either Cheryl or Carol from then on (she is referred to in the show's closed captioning as "Carol/Cheryl"). After being arrested by the FBI in the first episode of season 5, she signed her statement as "Cheryl and/or Carol Tunt." She claims to be 1/64th Cherokee Indian and has apparently had multiple stays at sanitariums/mental hospitals/insane asylums. She spends most of her time bickering with Pam, though they appear to be friends (they have been shown walking to work together, and Cheryl even invites Pam to join her on a trip on her train line).

Cheryl is often found sniffing glue, and suffers from pyromaniac and sadomasochistic tendencies. She regularly fantasizes about being choked during sex, with prominent ligature/manual strangulation marks occasionally visible on her neck. She also is easily turned on by slaps to the face, and even "emotional violence" can turn her on. Her lovers have included Cyril, Archer, Barry, Krieger, Randy Gillette, and Conway Stern. Cheryl continually demonstrates an alarming lack of intelligence yet makes references to obscure historical figures like Earl Butz, Elisha Otis and Granuaile O'Malley. She is repulsed by people with cancer (although she often either forgets, or does not even know, what cancer is), the handicapped, babies (though she hoped she was pregnant after having sex with Conway Stern), the deaf, and 'dwarfs'. She has also been known to shout or scream, whenever someone tells her to do something, "You're not my supervisor!" She has also apparently been the recipient of fortunetelling/prophecy from a gypsy woman, because she occasionally responds to an event by saying, "Just like the gypsy woman said."

Prior to the second season, Cheryl went by the surname Gimble before ISIS learns that she is an heiress to the billion-dollar Tunt railroad fortune, although her half is in a trust controlled by her gross brother Cecil, who uses it for charitable causes. Despite her position, Carol lives in an extravagant mansion next to the Roosevelt Mansion with a history of equally deranged family members and an ocelot named Babou, which she hates. She shares that insanity runs in her family as one uncle thought the Underground Railroad was a literal railroad, building tunnels to try and recapture escaped slaves and sell them back to their owners, in 1890. Though she still works as a secretary for Malory, Cheryl has ISIS on retainer to ensure her personal safety. In season five, after ISIS disbands, Cheryl decides to live out her dream to be a country singer with Malory as her manager. It is revealed that she has a beautiful singing voice whenever she is alone, but suffers from severe stage fright. Krieger implants a mind-altering chip in to Cheryl, which removes her stage fright (and also makes her more aggressive) and she begins a career under the name "Cherlene". Cherlene thinks she's hit success when her album goes platinum only to find that a South American dictator bought all the copies, and she returns to ISIS at the end of the season. It also turns out her "mind-altering chip" was really a sticker from the back of a Lego spaceman. In season 6, she decides to completely redo ISIS's new offices to be exactly the way they were just to mess with Malory. It is also revealed that she has no memory of her "Cherlene" career.

=== Archer: Dreamland ===
In Dreamland, Cheryl becomes Charlotte Vandertunt, an heiress to a publishing dynasty. She comes to Archer to fake her own death to escape her "quasi-incestuous family".

=== Archer: Danger Island ===
In Danger Island, Cheryl becomes Charlotte Stratton (née Vandertunt) a member of New York high-class society and stranded honeymooner (who Archer was having sex with and her husband stormed off after catching them together) who Mallory offers room and board in her hotel in exchange for her services as an escort to other guests.

=== Archer: 1999 ===
In 1999, Cheryl is the pilot of the Seamus' defensive fighter craft (portrayed in the style of the Battlestar Galactica Viper craft). She displays many of the same dark personality traits, such as a total disregard for the welfare of the other crew members when they are in mortal danger. Though her position as the crew’s ace combat pilot allows her to indulge in bloodlust, she repeatedly remarks on how boring it is because it does not challenge her.

== Pam Poovey ==
Pamela "Pam" Poovey (Amber Nash) is ISIS's Human Resources Director. She has platinum blonde hair and blue-gray eyes. In Season 2 Episode 10 "El Secuestro", it is revealed that Pam is 5 ft 7in, 250 lbs, and 32 years old when one looks at her driver's license.

She condescends to the staff by talking through a dolphin puppet in disciplinary meetings, and she regularly gossips confidential information to the whole office (within an hour, everyone knew when Archer was on a secret mole hunt), though she also relishes revealing more personal information (such as a co-worker being stricken with cancer) and posting office gossip on her blog. She's commented that the vast majority of work done at her job is filing sexual harassment complaints leveled against Archer. She is fond of bear claws and has been known to make growling sounds while eating them. She is also highly allergic to soy and soy-meat, but will keep on eating it if it tastes exactly like its meat counterpart. She carries a bug-out bag containing corn liquor in anticipation of TEOTWAWKI (The End Of The World As We Know It).

Pam is constantly subjected to cruel jokes about food and her weight. Apparently bisexual, she's initially desperate to get just one colleague of either gender to have sex with her, finally achieving this in the first-season finale, "Dial M for Mother", when Lana agrees to have pity sex on the condition she never speaks during it (so that Lana could pretend Pam was Alex Karras). By the end of season 4, Pam has had sexual relations with every member of the ISIS staff except Ray and Cheryl, as well as a recurring, casual relationship with Archer, beginning in "Crossing Over." Many of Pam's trysts involve drinking thermos-fulls of Green Russians, a cocktail of absinthe and milk. She has even expressed a desire for an office gang-bang (she keeps a large number of dolls and puppets in her desk, should a victim need to reenact one). A favorite sexual move of hers is called the MOAB. Her personal record for number of billiard balls stuffed in her mouth is four.

She grew up on her father's Wisconsin dairy farm, "Poovey Farms", where she once seduced a milkhand named Jorge. She has a fraught relationship with her sister Edie, who tormented her throughout her childhood. Known for having an extraordinary alcohol tolerance, she regularly totes a dispenser of Schützenmeister (a parody of Jägermeister) at parties and is frequently seen drinking a forty at work. Pam is by far the physically strongest member of ISIS, easily able to overpower multiple skilled opponents at once. "El Secuestro" revealed that she is an expert bare-knuckle pugilist, (her skill in street fighting financed her college education) possesses an extremely high tolerance for pain and has the third stanza of Lord Byron's "The Destruction of Sennacherib" tattooed on her back. Her favorite exclamation is "Holy shitsnacks!", or variations such as "shitzombies" or "shitninjas." Her go-to insult for most of her coworkers is "dicknuts." It is revealed in Season 3 that she has taken up drift-racing against the Yakuza as a hobby. Pam is a devoted graffiti artist and, as a running gag, her tags are frequently seen in the background .

In the season 4 episode, "Un Chien Tangerine", Pam applied to become a field agent. She took the aptitude test naked (so nobody thought she was cheating) and passed it with flying colors. When Malory didn't think Pam could handle herself in actual field work, Pam showed Malory a video where she took on Cyril, Krieger and Ray (who all wore body protection) while she was (still) naked, and won. She shadowed Lana and Archer on a mission to The Vatican, during which time she displayed an impressive aptitude for learning foreign languages.

In season five, after ISIS disbanded and became a drug cartel, Pam took a more active role in the group's missions in light of Ray's condition. However, during her first mission, Pam ended up becoming a cocaine addict as the result of the drug being absorbed into her skin when it was made into a body cast. Pam's addiction led to her eating a significant amount of the cocaine, to everyone else's frustration, and caused her to drastically lose weight. In the Season 5 finale, she delivered Lana's baby. By the start of season 6, she had kicked her cocaine habit (though remaining a heavy drinker), and regained the weight she had lost.

=== Archer: Dreamland ===
In Archer: Dreamland, Pam's character was changed significantly, becoming a man(although retaining the same face and voice) and working as a detective alongside Figgis, although frequently betraying Figgis in order to work with Archer. Detective Poovey is as corrupt as his partner but also has a more defined sense of honor, having saved a truck full of Chinese sex slaves meant to be sold to Len Trexler. He keeps the women in his apartment, who do his household chores for him, and is heartbroken after discovering that they leave him after the Woodhouse murder (and related events) is brought to a conclusion.

=== Archer: Danger Island ===
In Archer: Danger Island, Pam is depicted as Archer's best friend and co-pilot. In comparison with the real Pam, this version is noticeably taller, and being muscular instead of overweight.

=== Archer: 1999 ===
In 1999, Pam plays an alien "rock monster" of unknown origin. This version of Pam is very similar to her "real" version and tends to be crass and obnoxious.

== Ray Gillette ==
Raymond Q. "Ray" Gillette (Adam Reed) is an intelligence analyst, field agent, and one of the few competent members of ISIS. Like Lana, he is a much more conscientious field agent than Archer, and the two are close friends. Ray is openly gay and often verbally-abused in a sophomoric fashion by almost everyone who speaks to him, having an outright hostile relationship with Malory (who disparagingly refers to him as "Ms. Gillette") and an often-adversarial one with Archer though they frequently assist each other. Ray has blonde hair and brown eyes, along with an effeminate voice and pencil mustache.

In "Bloody Ferlin," Ray is revealed to have been born and raised in the backwoods town of Ferlin, West Virginia, where his brother Randy is a marijuana farmer who is unaware of Ray's occupation and sexual orientation. It is also revealed that Ray has changed the pronunciation of his surname, which his brother pronounces as "GILL-it."

In "A Going Concern," he reveals that he was once married to a lesbian he met at a "Pray Away the Gay" Bible group. Early in Season 2 he reveals he's an Olympic bronze medalist in Men's Giant Slalom, a finish he called "a huge disappointment". A recurring character in Season 1, Ray's much larger role in Season 2 depicted him as a more-than-capable field agent with expertise in wiring and explosives. In the Season 2 finale he reveals that he is an ordained but out-of-practice minister who is still allowed to perform marriages ("the irony of which is not lost on [him]"). He commonly wields a pair of Colt 1911 pistols with ivory grip inlays, and the names 'Barbra' and 'Liza' engraved on them.

In "Heart of Archness Part III", Ray is shot in the stomach which appears to render him paralyzed from the waist down. He uses a wheelchair for several episodes and is removed from active duty as a field agent with Cyril taking his position. However, in "Bloody Ferlin", Archer and Lana discover that Ray has been faking his paralysis since being discharged from the hospital following his recovery from his gunshot wound. In the Season 3 finale, "Space-Race 2", Ray ends up being paralyzed for real as the result of Archer interfering with Cyril's effort to land the spacecraft. In Season 4, Krieger gives Ray bionic leg-implants that allow him to walk again. In the season finale he is paralyzed once more when Archer accidentally short-circuits his bionic legs with a defibrillator. In season five, after ISIS disbands, Ray begins falling into a depression due to a combination of tutoring Cheryl and his lack of mobility. Krieger eventually reveals that the CPU in Ray's bionic legs simply needs to be rebooted in order to restore his ability to walk.

In "Pocket Listing," Ray was tasked to hide in among the plants of a greenhouse during a mission at Cheryl's mansion. While everyone else became sidetracked, Ray was left to fend off a gigantic carnivorous plant. He managed to survive, but lost his right arm below the elbow during the ordeal. Krieger transplanted a new bionic (and black) right hand for Ray (which is implied to have originally been made for Conway Stern). Ray later wears a black glove over his right hand, in what is possibly an homage to the character of Luke Skywalker in Return of the Jedi who wore a black glove over his own bionic right hand. After receiving his new hand, he shows a lot of distaste for it, leading everyone else to think he was being racist just because it's black. When Cyril brings up the subject to him, he reveals he doesn't mind the hand being black, he just dislikes how his original limbs are being replaced with robotic versions, and that he fears losing his humanity at some point.

=== Archer: Dreamland ===
In Dreamland, Ray is the bandleader for the band at Mother's nightclub, Dreamland.

=== Archer: Danger Island ===
In Danger Island, Ray is a gendarme named Reynaud and is head of the police force on the island.

=== Archer: 1999 ===
In 1999, Ray is a courtesan (a la Morena Baccarin's character in Firefly/Serenity), who formerly served as a Federation judge.

== Woodhouse ==
Sir Arthur Henry Woodhouse VC, GCB, DSO, DSC, MC (George Coe in seasons 1–4 & 10, Tom Kane in season 5, Roy McCrery in flashbacks, silent in seasons 6 and 8) is Sterling's long-suffering British valet who patiently accepts the unending stream of abuse Archer hurls at him. An avid heroin user, he apparently used to hang out with William S. Burroughs and may have been an accessory to the manslaughter of Joan Vollmer. He frequently hints at a mysterious military career that included experience with cannibalism in the King's African Rifles. In "The Double Deuce" he discusses being beside his squad leader (and, it is heavily implied, lover), Reggie Thistleton, for whom Woodhouse served as batman, as Thistleton was killed by a sniper during World War I. Woodhouse then killed and scalped over 50 German soldiers with a knife in an apparent berserker rage and was subsequently medically discharged. It was later revealed he received the Victoria Cross for his service. Woodhouse's other orders and decorations include being a Knight, Grand Cross of the Order of the Bath, which would entitle him to the honorific prefix 'Sir', the Distinguished Service Order, Distinguished Service Cross and the Military Cross. In the aftermath of his discharge Woodhouse seems to have traveled the world trying to forget Reggie, it is implied that his drug addiction started during this time in an oriental opium den, until at least WWII, when Malory Archer stumbled into his Tangiers bar in the throes of labor. After delivering Archer atop his bar, even inadvertently naming him, he helped Malory gun down Moroccan policemen and a German hit-squad who had been chasing her. He got the new family to safety and raised Sterling by himself for the first several years of his life. When properly motivated, Woodhouse has proven to be a proficient killing machine, even with a single knife; he also once knocked Pam unconscious with a single blow from a frying pan. Notably, Woodhouse is one of the few people Malory treats with respect and has been employed directly through ISIS since its inception. Archer on the other hand is quite unreasonable with him, routinely disciplining him by throwing his clothing, shoes, and other belongings over his balcony or by ordering Woodhouse to eat cobwebs. Archer also threatens to rub sand in his butler's eyes, then orders Woodhouse to buy "coarse" sand in preparation of the act. It is also made clear in the Season 1 episode "Killing Utne" that Sterling perceives Woodhouse as more of a house pet than a human being: When Woodhouse arrives at Malory's dinner party, Sterling states "I don't even know how you got out," and when Malory invites Woodhouse to sit down to dinner, Sterling scolds him and asserts that they should not be kind to him or "he'll think he's people". Despite this, in "The Papal Chase" Archer briefly expresses concern to Pam as to whether or not Woodhouse seems happy.

In "The Double Deuce" Woodhouse reveals that he is occasionally roused to action, as he pistol whips Archer into unconsciousness and announces his plan to "yank his pants off, splash a lot of scotch and women's underthings about, and then tell him he slipped and fell chasing a terrified Asian prostitute out onto the patio," which he has been forced to do to cover his tracks at least three or four times a year. He has a younger brother named Dicky, whom Archer abandoned in Mexico after the two absconded there from a Las Vegas jail. In "The Papal Chase", Archer reveals to Lana that Dicky has since died and that he never even bothered to inform Woodhouse of it. After ISIS is disbanded and Archer loses his penthouse, he still has Woodhouse move into the mansion the team uses in Vice, the elderly man living in the dried out swimming pool, before getting trapped under a medicine ball. Woodhouse does not appear in Season 6 or 7, with Archer at one point making copies of a "missing" poster for him. In the first episode of Season 8, his funeral is shown. His cause of death is not given, though he is implied to have died in the mansion in Vice.

=== Archer: Dreamland ===
Within Dreamland, a world existing almost entirely within Sterling Archer's mind, Woodhouse is his deceased partner, recently murdered. It is yet to be revealed whether or not Woodhouse was murdered in the "real world."

=== Archer: 1999 ===
In 1999, Archer hallucinates seeing Woodhouse in the brig at the end of the episode “Cubert”.

== Dr. Krieger ==
Doctor Algernop Krieger (Lucky Yates), is the head of the ISIS applied research department. He spends most of his time working on projects to facilitate his kinky sexual fantasies, including an advanced sex robot named Fister Roboto, a mechanical hand to choke Cheryl when his own hands are not strong enough for her taste, a drug that instills homosexual urges in its users (this eventually kills Danny the Intern), various animal-human hybrids, and a holographic anime girlfriend simulation so real that the state of New York legally allowed him to marry it (their plans were scuttled because "society couldn't deal with it"). Krieger has also displayed a fetish for homeless people and especially bumfights since his first speaking appearances in season one, though that fetish seems to have evolved as of season 3 to include specialized weapons, such as electrified boxing gloves.

He has admitted to not actually being a medical doctor, or a doctor in the sense of holding a PhD either, so either he uses "Doctor" as a fraudulent title, or else his first name is actually Doctor. He kills another intern, Chet, by having him wear a not-quite-bulletproof vest during a live-fire test. He's alluded to frequently drugging other co-workers, admitting to Pam "I've had good results with ether" when advising her on how to increase her odds for having sex with co-workers. For the first three episodes Krieger did not speak. His first lines, during the fourth episode, are a passionate defense of his reasoning for creating Fister Roboto.

Season 2 reveals that his 'father' was a Nazi scientist who escaped to Brazil, and Krieger is possibly a clone of Adolf Hitler (a reference to The Boys from Brazil). In a later episode, he ranted about it and points out he can't be due to the lack of similarity to Adolf and saying quote "If I was a clone of Adolf Goddamn Hitler, then wouldn't I look like Adolf Goddamn Hitler?!" (Krieger has brown hair and a beard as opposed to Hitler's black hair and mustache.)

The end of Season 2 reveals that he had been working on a project that, as KGB agent Katya Kazanova puts it, could "shift world power." But when he learns that the Russians have technology to build cyborgs, he remarks that his project was a failure as his 8 years of work was wasted.

He is an avid devotee of the Canadian rock band Rush, going so far as to having an expansive, elaborate drum set installed in his small apartment in an attempt to master their song "YYZ" (which Krieger insists be pronounced in the authentic Canadian style as "why-why-zed"). He also had a van with illegally tinted windows, a souped-up sound system, and the words "EXIT... VAN LEFT" airbrushed on the side. In the Season 2 episode "Double Trouble" the van was destroyed when Archer's fiancée Katya Kazanova sacrifices herself when Barry Dylan, now a cyborg, is attacking Archer by jumping off Archer's balcony, taking Barry with her. In Season 3 episode "The Man from Jupiter", Krieger has a new van that he calls "Vanispheres", which ends up getting shot up by a group of Cuban hitmen trying to kill Archer. Later in "Space Race: Part 2", Krieger's van has since been repainted with the Rush album image of Caress of Steel and rewritten to be titled "Caress of Krieger". In Season 4, Krieger has a new van called Van By Night that is painted with the cover art from the Rush album Fly by Night with Krieger's face superimposed on the head of the Snowy Owl. In season 6, the van is painted in the same pattern as Rush's self-titled debut album cover, with "Van" written in the same font as "Rush".

Krieger frequently angers the other ISIS employees but is invaluable to the agency for both his technological genius and his ability to dispose of dead bodies in a discreet, orderly and disturbingly efficient fashion. Though most of his actions seem to inspire disgust with his co-workers, Krieger seems to have a sympathetic view towards Archer.

In season 5, Krieger tries to help the team with their new cocaine empire but gets into trouble with such things as building a submarine—an exact copy of the Civil War submarine "Hunley"—at an indoor swimming pool, trying to use the cocaine to ballast it and when it fails, destroying all the cocaine. While visiting the mansion of a Central American dictator, Krieger is stunned to realize that the man's lab is staffed by a trio of clones identical to him. When the clones turn out to be insane and planning to fire a nerve gas missile (which has sufficient range to hit New York) Krieger fights them and seemingly kills them all, but his subsequent memory issues leave the others wondering if he's really their Krieger. He claims this is a result of a concussion sustained from a fall sufficiently high to kill at least one of the other clones with Krieger landing on him. When he rejoins the others, he has a visible bruise on his forehead. During the brawl with the clones, Krieger hit one of them in the forehead with a fire extinguisher, a possible hint that the surviving Krieger may be a clone. However, his claims that it wasn't a chip he implanted in Cheryl's head, along with the fact that he continued to defuse the nerve gas missile, do suggest he is the real Krieger. Occasional hints that he may be a clone continue throughout season 6. Show runner Adam Reed has gone on record to state that only he and voice actor Lucky Yates know whether or not Krieger is a clone. When Krieger and Pam talk to the aliens in area 51, the aliens use telepathy to read their minds, confirming he is not a clone

=== Archer: Dreamland ===
Krieger's character starts out as Dreamland's bartender in the story arc. Later it is revealed that he is a former double agent Jewish scientist Aaron Leibowitz, who worked with the Nazis during World War II to build bionic soldiers. However, he would purposely sabotage the experiments by injecting the potential bionic men with carbolic acid. His work in bionics continued after the war but his success has been limited to a cat, two dobermans and Dutch Dylan.

=== Archer: Danger Island ===
Krieger does not appear in season nine. Instead, the story arc portrays him as a wisecracking parrot named Crackers, also voiced by Lucky Yates (who guest-stars in season eleven as a hallucination of Archer's).

=== Archer: 1999 ===
On the MV Seamus, Krieger is an android member of the crew. Much like his other persona, he is a scientist in this story arc, but seems to be a bit less naïve. Being a "synthetic human", he is very sensitive about his shortcomings and weaknesses—the rest of the crew seems to be aware of this, which appears to encourage them. A second android accompanying another version of the crew cloned by Mother to man another ship also appears in the season, before being eaten by a space T. rex.

== Barry Dylan ==
Barry Dylan (Dave Willis) is Archer's revenge-obsessed archenemy, revealed to have been up for adoption as a child. Barry is introduced in the first season as an ODIN agent who was forced to retire from the field for an office job after a shattered femur caused by Archer during a botched mission in Berlin, his engagement to his fiancée Framboise ruined by Archer when he has sex with her while visiting ODIN on the premise of a job offer. This results in Barry blaming Archer for ruining his life as gradually becomes murderously insane over the course of the season while labeling his mental state as "Other Barry". Initially, Barry used nonlethal methods of revenge, such as securing for ODIN jobs which ISIS had obtained and manipulating a paternity test to indicate Archer as the father of Cyril's son with a prostitute. He also frequently mocks ISIS for their incompetence and has a sexual attraction to ISIS agent Lana Kane, an attraction that was initially mutual until Barry began attempting to extort sexual favors from her, partially to spite her past relationship with Archer.

Despite his hatred for Archer, Barry agreed to a mission to rescue him from the KGB which results in him being abandoned by Archer who allowed him to fall from a fire escape and being captured by the KGB who turned him into a cyborg to assassinate Katya Kazanova for defecting to ISIS. Though Barry inadvertently succeeded in his mission during Archer's wedding to Katya, his revenge obsession proved to be too much for the KGB to control as he murdered Nikolai Jakov, having his body completely destroyed just to prevent any closure if Jakov was Archer's biological father. But after Kreiger brought back Katya as a cyborg, their rematch devolving into a sexual encounter which ends Archer's engagement once again, Barry ends up losing leadership of the KGB to her while he ends up being stranded on Horizon and taking out his frustrations on the remaining crew while forcing them to make him a shuttle to return to Earth.

Upon returning to Earth, Barry resumes exacting his revenge through sabotaging ISIS professionally due to Katya's insistence that he let Archer live. But once Katya breaks up with him, Barry again attempts to kill Archer, this time at the wedding of Pam's sister, Edie. Pam and Archer manage to defeat Barry with his human skin burnt off in a grain elevator fire, forcing him to conceal his metallic endoskeleton in bandages. He returns in the season 7 episode "Motherless Child", having a temporarily truce with Archer's group to use their resources as a private detective agency to locate his birth mother, albeit holding Malory hostage to ensure compliance. In season 11, Barry returns to request the group's help in stopping an army of Barry robots the KGB has built. It is revealed that in the three years since Archer's coma, he has befriended the rest of the crew and has since attended therapy to control his anger. Though wary of him, Archer eventually warms up to him and is devastated when Barry seemingly kills himself to save him, Cyril, and Lana. Barry reappears from behind them and informs them that he downloaded his memory to another Barry robot, making him essentially unkillable. He now has a newfound hatred of Lana, who planned on sacrificing Barry so they could leave unscathed.

=== Archer: Dreamland ===
In Archer's Archer Dreamland fantasy, promoted to the main cast, Barry is portrayed as Len Trexler's right-hand enforcer "Dutch" Dylan, whose specialty is said to be dissolving people in acid. While overseeing Trexler's sex trade scheme, Dutch ends up with his legs crushed under a truck by Archer after he insulted him with Trexler sending Dutch to have his legs (and undamaged arms) replaced with robotic limbs developed by Krieger while needing a regular dose of a special fluid to keep him alive. The ordeal intensified Dutch's insanity as he storms back to Trexler's mansion to have revenge on his employer, arranging a still-living Trexler and his slaughtered bodyguards in a Last Supper-like set-up. Upon Archer's arrival, Dutch recognizes him and extends his revenge on him that leads to car chase that ends with Dutch seeming killed after being repeatedly run over by Archer. But Dutch survives and commandeers a vehicle to reach Dreamland to get a refill before attempting to kill all those present while revealing himself as Woodhouse's killer for cutting him off in traffic (he also admits to doing so just to see the life go out of Woodhouse's eyes). Upon realizing that Dutch won't be anything more than a killing machine, Krieger sets his cyborg dogs on Dutch, who is torn apart and eaten by them.

=== Archer: Danger Island ===
Though Barry does not directly appear in season 9, a nemesis character named Ziegler, who bears a striking resemblance to Barry, appeared briefly, voiced by Flula Borg. Ziegler is a German flying ace who shot Archer down five times during the Spanish Civil War due to the superiority of the German planes. He’s also responsible for this iteration of Archer missing an eye. Archer eventually hijacks one of the German planes and he and Pam shoot down Ziegler in a dogfight, killing him, while simultaneously seeming to make Archer’s case that Ziegler only appeared to be better than Archer during the war due to his more advanced aircraft.

=== Archer: 1999 ===
During season 10, Barry returns as Barry-6, a robot the crew encounters in space. This Barry aids in hosting gladiator shows, and once attempted to take over the ship, though he ultimately fails when Cyril's suppressing fire manages to take out all of his men.

== Len Trexler ==
Len Trexler (Jeffrey Tambor) is the head of rival spy agency ODIN (Organization of Democratic Intelligence Networks), a Paris-based organization which regularly undercuts ISIS for lucrative government contracts, as a result of ODIN's regular engagement in bribery. ODIN enjoys fancier offices, higher salaries and more advanced equipment than ISIS, but is bogged down in the same kind of petty office politics. Trexler may be Sterling's biological father. He purchases ISIS in an attempt to get Malory to marry him, but Archer, Cyril and Krieger brainwash him (with the assistance of a KGB mind-control chip salvaged from Archer's head) into no longer finding Malory attractive. The effects of the brainwashing may be permanent as well as not limited to his perception of Malory; he displays such a decrease in cognitive function that even Sterling expresses guilt about it.

=== Archer: Dreamland ===
Trexler is promoted to the main cast in Archer Dreamland and portrayed in Archer's fantasy as the most powerful mobster in Los Angeles with "Dutch" Dylan as his loyal lieutenant until arranging him to be made into a 1940s cyborg by Krieger. This resulted in Trexler being attacked by his former henchman and escaping with Archer's team to Dreamland.

== Fabian Kingsworth ==
Fabian Kingsworth (Kayvan Novak) is the powerful head of the International Intelligence Agency (IIA), the new up and coming private intelligence service that, during Archer's coma, overtook and bought out ODIN. He spends most of season 12 after an advanced energy device. After the Agency stops his plans, however, he reveals he has bought out the Agency, so they all now work for Fabian, who wants the Agency to be a "boutique intelligence service" for "discerning clients".

== Zara Khan ==
Zara Khan (Natalie Dew) joins the agency in season 14. She was considered the best agent in Interpol before joining the agency. Zara is considered to rival Archer's espionage skills. Zara displays similar personality traits to both Archer and Lana. The two appear as friends and rivals in the final season.

== Recurring characters ==
- Katya Kazanova (Ona Grauer) is a sexy KGB Agent who wishes to defect to ISIS. When Archer goes to Russia to investigate Nikolai Jakov being his biological father, Katya saves his life. She makes Archer promise to take her back to the States, which he does, and asks to become an ISIS Agent. Katya reveals that she became smitten with Archer the instant she first saw a picture of him when in training with the KGB. Archer quickly falls in love with Katya, and even tries to quit drinking for her. Later, Archer asks her to marry him, and she agrees. The impromptu ceremony takes place on Archer's balcony, but when Barry Dylan appears and attempts to kill Archer, Katya grabs Barry and jumps off the building, committing suicide in an attempt to save Archer. Archer cries hysterically and ends up vanishing for three months. Upon his return, he has processed his grief and claims to barely remember Katya's name. It is revealed later in season three that Dr. Krieger surreptitiously stole Katya's body and rebuilt her as a cyborg. She is resurrected and reunited with Archer, requiring him to get over his fear of robots. They nearly marry, but their wedding is interrupted by Barry (again), who tracked Katya down thanks to a part purchased from the KGB by Krieger, and Katya's fight with him eventually turns into sex, and the two cyborgs run off together leaving Archer brokenhearted. Months later, she contacts Archer, pleading for him to help find a way to bring Barry back to Earth, with Archer instead deciding to try to make Katya think Barry is cheating on her to have Katya come back to him. Ultimately, it turned out Katya was only leading Archer on in order to get him to help bring Barry back to Earth. Even when he returned to Earth, Katya made it clear she refused to have Barry kill him. The factor that Barry still wanted to murder Archer, most likely put them at odds. Katya has displaced him as head of the KGB and eventually leaves him for another man.
- Nikolai Jakov (Peter Newman) is the head of the KGB. He is in a secret relationship with Malory (the two would be ruined should their affair become public) and shares Trexler's status as Archer's possible biological father. He has a large video screen link directly to her office, which he uses to talk with her on a regular basis. He continually tries to persuade Malory to live with him in Moscow, often going to extreme lengths such as staging the assassination of a U.N. official at her dinner party and using a whole KGB surveillance team to make a sex tape of her for blackmail purposes. He desperately wishes to be Archer's father, even calling him "son," but with the caveat that if he discovered that Archer was not his son, he would personally kill him. Jakov is briefly united with Archer, as he defects from the KGB, only to be killed by Barry at an ISIS safehouse. Before his death, Jakov attempted to record a video for Sterling, though the whereabouts of the video still remain a mystery. Although his subordinates address him as "Major", this may be an in-joke ("Major Jack-off"), as he wears a Major General's uniform with KGB royal blue colors.
- Brett Bunson Buckley (Neal Holman) is an ISIS worker who is frequently injured in the office by being shot. He was heard (and shot) several times in Season 1, but was not seen until the Season 1 finale. He has been shot four times by Archer and once by Lana, Cyril, and Hollywood starlet Rona Thorne. He has also been badly beaten twice by Archer and once by Barry Dillon. Brett is finally killed in Season 5 when he gets a bullet to the forehead during an FBI raid on ISIS.
- Mitsuko Miyazumi (Judy Greer) is a corporeal hologram that serves as Doctor Krieger's girlfriend. According to Archer, she is so real that the state of New York was going to allow Krieger to marry her. Krieger had their entire wedding planned, but he apparently reconsidered because of how society would look upon them. She has since become a recurring character in the series. She is occasionally seen reading tentacle pornography, or conversing with the ISIS mainframe.
- Ron Cadillac (Ron Leibman) is Malory's new husband and the largest Cadillac dealer in the tri-state area. He is amiable, if gruff, and is liked by everyone at ISIS except his new stepson. He was previously a car thief whose original last name was Kazinsky. His uncouth behavior frequently irritates Malory, like bringing crackers and jelly with him to the opera and his casual, though well-meaning, racism tends to infuriate Lana. Though Ron stood by Malory's side, he ultimately left her after being shot by the Yakuza when he learned of one of her old flames. In a later episode, Malory reveals they are getting back together, but that it is still not very solid. At some point, they even tried an open marriage. In Ron's last appearance, he's with Mallory at her retirement beach, the two finally back together for good. Ron was voiced by Jessica Walter's real-life husband, Ron Leibman.
- Slater (Christian Slater), an arms dealer who is eventually revealed to be an undercover CIA agent who later becomes Malory's primary contact with the agency in Season 6. Modeled after his voice actor, he insists that his name is a mononym.
- Trinette McGoon (Maggie Wheeler) is Archer's favorite call girl. She answers to a pimp named Popeye. In the second season she has a son named Seamus Sterling Magoon-Archer ("The Wee Baby Seamus") and forces Archer to submit to a paternity test overseen by ODIN. Archer, sure that he is the father, switches his own blood for Cyril's, who turns out to be the actual father. Archer is then stuck paying child support to Trinette and looking after Seamus occasionally, although Trinette knows he isn't the real father. Popeye buys the laundromat that the ISIS Headquarters building sits atop (and has a secret elevator into behind a wall of fake washers) and tells the team that he has "gone straight".

Trinette shows up during Archer: Dreamland, when Archer hires her as an extra for the planned ransom handoff, and ends up tagging along through Barry's attack on Len Trexler's estate, later getting Cecil Vandertunt to the hospital. In the end, Cecil ends up marrying Trinette.

- Rodney (Andrew Donnelly) is the new supervisor of the armory at ISIS, a sarcastic pencil-pusher who enjoys having the ISIS agents go through endless paperwork to acquire weapons for missions. Rodney is undaunted by the verbal abuse from ISIS agents, being protected by bullet-proof glass and also being able to lock them out of (or inside) the armory with the press of a button. After ISIS was shut down by the CIA, Rodney stole all the weapons from the ISIS armory and became an arms dealer.
- Hawley (Gary Cole) At first appearing as the lead FBI agent that busts ISIS, he is later revealed to actually be a CIA agent who has been using them as a front for a drug smuggling operation. He later is their CIA superior, using Slater as his main go-between.
- Bilbo (Adam Reed) is a heavyset ISIS worker who mans the control room. Bilbo likes to work The Lord of the Rings references into his conversations, and is occasionally victim to Archer's verbal and physical abuse. He is slapped by Malory in Episode 8 of Season 4 causing him to have a heart attack and die. Nobody notices this except Krieger who laughs and mocks Bilbo for being killed by a slap. Due to an out-of-order airing (Episode 8 is second in the season's production order), his death is referenced by Krieger in Episode 6.
- Mannfred and Uta (René Auberjonois and Kathryn Cressida) are a pair of German freelance assassins. Uta resembles the main character from the film Run Lola Run. The two are in a relationship despite Uta being 19 and Mannfred being middle-aged (Uta admits during an argument that they are together mainly because of her unresolved issues with her father). Uta desperately wants to have a baby to the extent of wearing a prosthetic pregnancy belly and believing that she is actually pregnant. Mannfred reluctantly tolerates her delusions, and she is later seen carrying a life-sized doll in a baby carrier. Jakov regularly hires them for New York-based activities like assassinating a U.N. official or kidnapping Archer to implant a mind-control microchip in his brain. Mannfred is almost always seen wielding a Mauser C96 broomhandle pistol.
- Rip Riley (Patrick Warburton) is an adventurer and former ISIS agent recruited by Malory (who appears to be an old flame) to track down Archer and bring him home after he disappears following Katya's death. Rip flies a seaplane he calls 'Loosey Goosey' which he adamantly claims is practical despite its obvious shortcomings for the mission. Savvy, level-headed Rip is familiar with the threat of modern pirates and has a good knowledge of geography. As a former ISIS field agent Rip also has good combat, weapon and survival skills. Although Rip is confident and pragmatic he is somewhat arrogant and short-tempered with Archer (mainly due to Archer's personality).
- Noah (David Cross) is an anthropologist turned pirate slave, who becomes Archer's First Mate and translator when Archer becomes the Pirate King in the "Heart of Archness" arc.

Noah returns in Danger Island as an anthropologist studying the Mua-Mua cannibal tribe, who later joins Archer's team in their quest to find the idol.

- Burt Reynolds, after being referenced in many episodes as Archer's favorite actor, personal hero, and "spirit guide," appears as himself in the episode "The Man From Jupiter," immediately besting Archer in a bar fight. Archer is thrilled to meet his idol but horrified to discover that Reynolds is dating Malory. Archer attempts to break up his mother's relationship with Reynolds, but accepts it after Reynolds convinces him that he needs to see Malory as someone with emotional (and sexual) needs, not just his mother. The fact that he convinces him while driving Archer around the city in an extremely awesome car chase doesn't hurt his cause. It is implied later on in Season 3 that Reynolds is still dating Malory, but not regularly, leading Malory to believe that Burt is ashamed of being seen with her, and their relationship has ended by season 4.
- Cecil Tunt (Eugene Mirman) is Cheryl's brother, and current head of the Tunt family fortune. He is a dedicated philanthropist, giving hundreds of millions to many charitable and ecological projects.

In "Archer: Dreamland", Cecil Vandertunt is a far more creepy and corrupt character, living a life of luxury in Vandertunt Manor, and often making very disturbing comments.

- Gustavo and Juliana Calderon (Fred Armisen and Lauren Cohan), the totalitarian dictator of the small South American country of San Marcos and his scheming, seductive First Lady. Gustavo is engaged in a brutal civil war against communist rebels secretly backed by the CIA, who are also involved in a cocaine-for-weapons deal with Calderon that Archer and his team blunder their way into. A bumbling but violent dictator, Calderon is far more interested in Cherlene, whose music he becomes obsessed with to the point where he buys one million copies of her album to ensure it goes platinum. His wife, Juliana, is implied to have been previously married to his father (the island's previous dictator), and seduces Archer immediately upon his arrival in San Marcos while disguised as a maid. He eventually divorces Juliana to marry Cherlene, but is immediately deposed by Cyril, who imprisons him alongside Archer and forcibly marries Juliana. Gustavo, Cherlene and Archer join forces to escape prison, but he is killed when Cherlene releases a tiger from his personal zoo, which devours him. Juliana is implied to have fled the country soon after.
- Veronica Deane (Mary McDonald-Lewis), a world-famous actress who first comes into contact with the Figgis Agency when a mysterious imposter hires them for an assignment.
- Alan Shapiro (Patton Oswalt), Veronica Deane's personal attorney.
- Ellis Crane (John O'Hurley), Veronica Deane's ex-husband, and a major Hollywood director.
- Detectives Bob Harris and Deidrich (J. K. Simmons and Keegan-Michael Key, respectively), two detectives first met investigating the apparent murder of Sterling Archer in Veronica Deane's pool in a flash-forward. They have since hovered around several dealings of the Figgis Agency.
- AJ (Kimberly Woods) is the daughter of Lana Kane and Sterling Archer, conceived via IVF. When Archer fell into a coma, she spent most of her time growing up in Europe.
- Robert (Stephen Tobolowsky) is a billionaire who became Lana's husband while Archer was in his coma, raising AJ as his own daughter. The pair eventually divorce after Archer unknowingly misleads Robert into believing he and Lana are having an affair, and he in turn has an affair.

== Other characters ==
Other characters have been voiced by Keith Szarabajka (Crenshaw), Coby Bell (Conway Stern), Audrey Wasilewski (Elke Hubsch), Ron Perlman (Ramon Limon), Thomas Lennon (Charles), Robert Ben Garant (Rudi), Rafael Ferrer (Spirodon Skorpio), Stephen Stanton (Captain Lammers and Ken Hinkins), Kari Wahlgren (Anka Schlotz), Clarke Peters (Popeye), Peter Serafinowicz (George Spelvin, Benoit and a fictionalized version of James Mason), Joan Van Ark (Ruth), Darren Criss (Mikey Hannity), George Takei (Mr. Moto), Michael Rooker (Sherriff E.Z. Ponder), Jack McBrayer (Randy Gillette), Bryan Cranston (Commander Tony Drake) and Timothy Olyphant (Lucas Troy). In addition to their primary roles, Judy Greer also voices Framboise, the human resources director at ODIN, while Jeffrey Tambor voices Torvald Utne, a United Nations bureaucrat from whom Malory wants to secure a lucrative weapons contract. H. Jon Benjamin's Bob's Burgers co-stars have appeared on the show, including John Roberts (playing the in-universe version of Linda who married an amnesiac Archer and called him "Bob".), Eugene Mirman (Cecil Tunt) and Kristen Schaal (Tiffy). Keith David and C.C.H. Pounder play Lana's parents Lemuel and Claudette in the episode "The Kanes".

== See also ==
List of Kingsman characters
