= Archer season 8 =

Archer Dreamland
- Season 8
- Promotional poster
- Starring: H. Jon Benjamin; Judy Greer; Amber Nash; Chris Parnell; Aisha Tyler; Lucky Yates; Jessica Walter; Dave Willis; Jeffrey Tambor
- No. of episodes: 8

Release
- Original network: FXX
- Original release: April 5 – May 24, 2017

Season chronology
- ← Previous; Season 7 Next → Archer Danger Island

Archer Dreamland is the eighth season of the animated television series Archer, created by Adam Reed. The first season to air on FXX since the series was moved from FX, consisting of eight episodes, and the first part of the "coma dream" trilogy (followed by Archer Danger Island and Archer 1999), it aired from April 5 to May 24, 2017.

== Production ==
FX renewed Archer for three more seasons with each season consisting of a total of eight episodes. On January 12, 2017, it was announced that the series would relocate to FX's sister channel FXX, beginning with Season 8 onwards.

This season was notable for portraying Sterling Archer in a more sympathetic light than all previous seasons, i.e. far less narcissistic and irritable, while Dave Willis and Jeffrey Tambor were promoted to the main cast as new incarnations of Barry Dylan and Len Trexler.

After the success of the hidden scavenger hunts in Seasons 6 and 7, animator Mark Paterson devised an augmented reality mobile phone app called Archer, PI to run side-by-side with the show. It featured 8 interactive cases, one for each episode, that could only be accessed by viewing the episode through the phone's camera, "something that had never been attempted in the history of television" according to the creator. The app won two Clio Awards in 2017 and was a finalist for several awards in 2018.

The episode "Auflösung" (German word for "resolution") is dedicated to George Coe, who was the voice of Woodhouse in the first four seasons of the show and died on July 18, 2015, before the episode aired.

== Synopsis ==
This season resolves the cliffhanger from the previous season, which ended with Archer floating lifeless in a swimming pool after being shot several times. It is revealed that Archer survived but has been in a coma for three months, trapped in a 1947 noir-esque Los Angeles. It also reveals the fate of Woodhouse (whose original voice actor George Coe died in 2015), the heroin-addicted valet of Archer dying shortly before the season premiere.

In this season, Archer appears as a freelance detective who seeks to find justice for his murdered partner Woodhouse, leading him into a complex web of crime bosses, espionage, and personal entanglements. Malory Archer is "Mother", the owner of the luxury jazz nightclub called "Dreamland" along with a henchman named Zerk and a rival to mobster Len Trexler. Detective Figgis (played by Cyril Figgis) is a corrupt Los Angeles police detective who is secretly working for Trexler along with the right-hand enforcer "Dutch" Dylan (played by Barry Dylan). Figgis' partner is a rookie, Detective Poovey (played by Pam Poovey), who is also crooked but still has some sense of honor. Krieger is Dreamland's bartender but secretly carries out experiments with bionics in an underground laboratory. Lana is an undercover agent with the Treasury Department investigating Mother who gets a job as the featured lounge singer at Dreamland. Charlotte Vandertunt (played by Cheryl Tunt) is a ditzy heiress who wants to escape her "quasi-incestuous family".

== Episodes ==
No. overall	No. in season	Title	Written by	Original release date	Prod. code	US viewers (millions)
86	1	"No Good Deed"	Adam Reed	April 5, 2017	XAR08001	0.74
Archer is in a coma due to the gunshot wounds he sustained from Veronica Deane. While in the coma, he dreams he is a private eye set on finding justice for his murdered partner Woodhouse. Archer butts heads with detectives Figgis and Poovey. He interrogates Woodhouse's dealer Krieger, a bartender at a club owned by the crime boss known as Mother. Impressed with his war experience, Mother agrees to help Archer find Woodhouse's killer, but, in exchange, Archer must get information on Len Trexler, the biggest mob boss in town. While spying on Trexler’s second in command, Dutch Dylan, Archer runs into Poovey, and together, they foil Trexler's scheme to import Asian women for the sex trade. Poovey takes all the abducted women to her home while Archer returns to his office to find it ransacked and Woodhouse’s envelope of clues stolen. Charlotte Vandertunt enters and wants Archer to murder her. Guest star: Wyatt Cenac as Cliff
87	2	"Berenice"	Adam Reed	April 12, 2017	XAR08002	0.50
Charlotte elaborates on her request for Archer to murder her, explaining that she actually wants him to help her fake her own death in exchange for $10,000. Charlotte has already provided a convincing body double, the maid Berenice who died having an abortion after becoming pregnant with Charlotte's brother. Archer agrees to help Charlotte fake her death with Berenice's body as a decoy. Meanwhile, Trexler insists that Figgis and Poovey return his abducted women and hire Krieger to build new feet. While preparing to launch Charlotte’s car off a cliff containing Berenice's body, Archer and Charlotte are caught red-handed by detectives Figgis and Poovey. Guest star: Jeffrey Tambor as Len Trexler
88	3	"Jane Doe"	Adam Reed	April 19, 2017	XAR08003	0.47
Archer and Charlotte are arrested for the murder of Berenice and taken to prison. While in holding, Archer recruits the help of the Dreamland band, who are in for drug offenses, to rescue Charlotte. The whole gang fights Poovey, who is captured and handcuffed to a pipe. Archer, Charlotte, and the band return to Dreamland, where Mother decides to collect a ransom for returning Charlotte to her family. Guest stars: Wyatt Cenac as Cliff, Keegan-Michael Key as Floyd, Wendell Pierce as Verl, and Jeffrey Tambor as Len Trexler
89	4	"Ladyfingers"	Adam Reed	April 26, 2017	XAR08004	0.48
Archer drives to the Vandertunt mansion to convince her father that Charlotte has been kidnapped for a ransom while Figgis and Poovey also call the house to demand a ransom. The father is comatose, and Charlotte's brother Cecil demands one of her fingers to determine who has her. Archer makes a deal with Poovey to get a finger from Berenice's body in the morgue. Meanwhile, in Krieger's laboratory in Dreamland's basement, Dutch awakens to find his legs and arms replaced with mechanical ones. Guest star: Eugene Mirman as Cecil Vandertunt
90	5	"Sleepers Wake"	Adam Reed	May 3, 2017	XAR08005	0.44
Mother arranges a deal with Cecil for a $1 million ransom for Charlotte's return, and Archer picks up the money. Meanwhile, Lana seduces Archer for a cut of the ransom. Figgis also has his eyes on the ransom to clear his debt to Trexler for the loss of his shipment of women. Dutch is unhappy about Krieger's modifications to his body but finds it useful when he beats up a group of bikers and takes a motorcycle. At the drop-off, Figgis grabs the money and takes off. Archer gives chase, but Figgis shoots at his car, which runs off the road and crashes. Archer has to explain his failure to get the ransom money to Mother. Guest stars: Eugene Mirman as Cecil Vandertunt and Jeffrey Tambor as Len Trexler
91	6	"Waxing Gibbous"	Adam Reed	May 10, 2017	XAR08006	0.38
Mother sends Archer off to retrieve the ransom money from Figgis, assuming he would have taken it to Trexler. Figgis and Poovey arrive at Trexler's mansion to find no security and the front door open. Archer also arrives after pushing Trinette out of his moving car. He is followed by Cecil and Lana, who pick up Trinette and reveal she is an IRS agent. They all enter the mansion and discover Trexler tied up at a table in a room filled with dead men. The table setting reminds them of the Last Supper. Dutch greets them. Guest stars: Eugene Mirman as Cecil Vandertunt and Jeffrey Tambor as Len Trexler
92	7	"Gramercy, Halberd!"	Adam Reed	May 17, 2017	XAR08007	0.31
The group discovers that Dutch has betrayed Trexler, and attacks them. As Dutch's mechanical arms and legs make him almost invincible, they quickly race out of the building. Trinette takes Cecil to the hospital to treat his wounds from ricocheting bullets while the others drive off with Archer at the wheel. Dutch pursues them on his motorcycle, and although they are all armed, they are unable to stop Dutch. It is left to Archer and his driving skills to bring Dutch down, after which he runs over him with the car several times. As they drive off, Trexler says that Mother killed Woodhouse. Guest stars: Eugene Mirman as Cecil Vandertunt and Jeffrey Tambor as Len Trexler
93	8	"Auflösung"	Adam Reed	May 24, 2017	XAR08008	0.42
Trexler explains that Mother had a henchman named Zerk to kill Woodhouse because of unpaid debt for drugs, but when they return to Dreamland, Mother denies the accusation. However, Dutch burst in, seeking revenge on Trexler and Archer, who explained that he had killed Woodhouse in cold blood. As Dutch is about to attack them both, Krieger arrives, disappointed that Dutch is not using his power for good, and summons his mechanically enhanced dobermanns to tear Dutch apart, killing him. In this scene, Lana discloses that she is a Treasury agent, Mother accidentally fires Archer's gun, before Poovey takes the gun from Mother and "accidentally" shoots Lana five more times, killing her. Later, Archer opens the bag and finds that it only contains Cecil's magazines, revealing that there is no money in it. Later in the hospital, Trinette marries Cecil, and Poovey returns home to find that the Chinese sex slave hostages have left, leaving just a goodbye note. Afterward, Archer thanks Woodhouse for solving the investigation, giving a pouch of heroin as a funeral gift. The episode ends with a credit scene "dedicated to George Coe," the actor who voiced Woodhouse in the earlier seasons of the series. Guest stars: Eugene Mirman as Cecil Vandertunt and Jeffrey Tambor as Len Trexler

== Critical response ==
On Rotten Tomatoes the season has an approval rating of 86% based on 14 reviews, with an average rating of 7.5/10. On Metacritic the season has a score of 72 out of 100, based on 8 critics, indicating "generally favorable reviews".
