= Archer season 10 =

Archer 1999
- Season 10
- Promotional poster
- No. of episodes: 9

Release
- Original network: FXX
- Original release: May 29 – July 31, 2019

Season chronology
- ← Previous; Archer Danger Island Next → Season 11

Archer 1999 is the tenth season of the animated television series, Archer, created by Adam Reed, and the final season for Reed as a full-time showrunner. The third and final part of the "coma dream" trilogy (preceded by Archer Dreamland and Archer Danger Island), consisting of nine episodes, it aired from May 29 to July 31, 2019, on FXX.

== Production ==
FXX announced that Season 10 would see a change in setting yet again, now with this series taking place in outer space. As with the previous two seasons, the same voice cast would return as different versions of their characters. This means that Archer, who was found shot in actress Veronica Deane's pool after season seven, remains in a coma, and the events of the season are of his imagination.

These different versions have similar personalities to their "normal" counterparts but are in different jobs or roles and have different relationships. The season's premise sees Archer as the hard-drinking half-captain (with Lana Kane as the other half-captain) of the spacefaring M/V Seamus salvage ship.

This is the first season where creator Adam Reed did not write every episode for the season.

== Synopsis ==
Sterling Archer, in his comatose dreaming, imagines that he is the captain of the "M/V Seamus (934TXS)", a space salvage freighter, co-captaining with his ex-wife Lana, with whom he is co-owner of the ship. At the same time, Cyril is the onboard accountant as well as Lana's lover, Pam is a hulking rock golem-like alien, Cheryl/Carol is a bloodthirsty/suicidal space fighter pilot, Ray is a gay courtesan (à la Inara Serra), Krieger is the android scientist/doctor on board, and "Mother", or Ms. Archer, is holographic AI avatar in the form of a glowing ball of light. Amongst the recurring characters are Barry-6, a rogue robotic space-pirate, and humanoid space-captain Brett.

The crew has sci-fi space operatic adventures with the usual hijinks, which is inspired by the aesthetic and homage to Ridley Scott's Alien's space trucker crew. In the last two episodes late in the season, the borderline between dream and reality gradually begins to blur within its existence upon the sci-fi premise (which exists only in Archer’s imagination) as Archer gets flashes of the characters in their true forms and believes that he has gone completely insane. At the end of the season, Sterling awakens from his coma in the hospital, three years after being shot.

== Episodes ==
No. overall	No. in season	Title	Written by	Original release date	Prod. code	US viewers (millions)
102	1	"Bort the Garj"	Adam Reed	May 29, 2019	XAR010001	0.45
The spaceship MV Seamus is near Altair Beta on route to Earth with its crew in stasis state. They are awakened by the ship's computer AI, Malory who appears as a glowing orb, when it detects a ship wrecked by Dri'n pirates. They board the ship to salvage anything usable. After docking, a green, triangular, blob-like alien xenomorph lifeform comes aboard their ship, chased by Dri'n pirates, but they manage to escape the wreck. The alien identifies himself as Bort from the planet Garj's moon and claims he is from a wealthy family that would pay a reward for his return. They travel to Garj's moon, but discover it is a trap by the sentient, rogue robot Barry 6 and Dri'n pirates who plan to sell the crew as slaves. Guest star: Sam Richardson as Bort
103	2	"Happy Borthday"	Adam Reed	June 5, 2019	XAR010002	0.29
Archer is strapped down by Barry 6 and tortured by a robotic bird named Funbeak to force Archer to reveal the location of the cargo he stole, but he refuses to talk. Barry 6 then informs the crew that they have been entered into gladiator fights to the death for Bort's birthday party. Malory takes over Funbeak and frees Archer who pretends to be a gladiator. He manages to get the crew out of the arena to set them free and fly off back onto the ship. Guest star: Sam Richardson as Bort
104	3	"The Leftovers"	Mark Ganek	June 12, 2019	XAR010003	0.34
Back on their spaceship, Pam's sandwich filling turns out to be a creature with a massive appetite that eats their food supply. It also lays an endless supply of eggs, and the desperately hungry crew begins to eat them. However, the eggs cause the crew to behave unpredictably, releasing their deepest desires, including a massive increase in Archer and Lana's libidos. Cheryl eventually resolves the situation by ejecting the creature and its eggs into space.
105	4	"Dining with the Zarglorp"	Shane Kosakowski	June 19, 2019	XAR010004	0.24
The MV Seamus is swallowed by a giant space nautilus, with Cheryl left outside in their small pilot ship. They encounter another person, Glenda Price, captain of a starship that was also eaten by the Zarglorp and whose crew is all now dead. Left alone with Cyril while the others try to free their ship, Price tries to convince Cyril to kill himself so he can be eaten. When Archer discovers that Price was instrumental in the deaths and cannibalism of her crew, he appeals to her ego and convinces her to sacrifice herself by blowing up her ship with her so the Zarglorp will expel the MV Seamus.
106	5	"Mr. Deadly Goes to Town"	Mark Ganek	June 26, 2019	XAR010005	0.29
The MV Seamus is pulled out of hyperspace to find an ominous-looking space station looming over them. Malory sends the crew aboard it on a scavenger mission and they find a large number of crumbling corpses from a battle of thousands of years ago. They also encounter an android, which is a lonely doomsday device, who identifies himself as Mr. Deadly and insists they take him with them. They travel to Laki space station to try to get him interested in life experiences and prevent him from detonating, and after some time he decides to choose to live. However, after a shoot-out with two arms dealers, one lies dying and he asks Mr. Deadly to detonate. In desperation to save the crew, Archer throws a quantum singularity bomb at the android which sucks it into itself before reappearing elsewhere in the galaxy and creating an apocalyptic explosion. Guest star: Matt Berry as Mr. Deadly
107	6	"Road Trip"	Mike Arnold	July 10, 2019	XAR010006	0.25
The crew responds to a distress beacon but Archer causes their shuttle to crash land while mixing a cocktail. They follow the beacon through a jungle to find a replacement fuel cell. They find the other ship, which has a crew similar to themselves, except Krieger, who suggests they may be a doppelganger from the multiverse. Archer finds a fuel cell but they are stalked by a huge dinosaur-like beast. The crew becomes holed up in a cave but Archer installs the fuel cell in the shuttle, and after making a cocktail, he uses it to destroy the beast. On returning to the MV Seamus, Malory reveals that the other crew were clones produced by Krieger so she could double their productivity.
108	7	"Space Pirates"	Kelly Galuska	July 17, 2019	XAR010007	0.26
While Archer and Lana fight over whether to return to Earth, their ship exits hyperspace next to a Dri'n pirate battle cruiser. Malory and Archer decide to destroy the bounty so the crew makes their way aboard and begins placing thermite explosives. They discover the cruiser carries a cargo of rare endangered Grimalkians which Archer calls "space ocelots". The cat-like creatures are strangely friendly to him but reject Lana's attempts to befriend them. When the crew is attacked and cornered by pirates in the trash compactor, Archer's pet Grimalkian summons the others who arrive and disintegrate the pirates. The crew safely returned to the MV Seamus with seconds to spare before the explosives detonated. However, their ship is now filled with Archer-loving Grimalkians.
109	8	"Cubert"	Adam Reed & Tesha Kondrat	July 24, 2019	XAR010008	0.23
The crew of the MV Seamus finds a mysterious, reflective cube and takes it aboard. It seems to have no discernible properties until it detects aggression and sucks Cheryl's head into itself when she gets angry but then releases her after she calms down. When suddenly the crew finds their newfound object missing, members scatter to hunt down their new bounty. However, the hunt grows more and more confusing as Archer starts experiencing hallucinations and seeing members of the crew as they appeared in earlier series. This completely disorientates him and after he attacks Lana, they throw him into the cabin where to his surprise, he accepts a cocktail from Woodhouse.
110	9	"Robert De Niro"	Adam Reed	July 31, 2019	XAR010009	0.25
The crew holds a mock trial to try Archer for Lana's assault due to his antisocial behavior. During the trial, Barry 6 crashes his ship into the MV Seamus and leads a boarding party of Dri'n pirates. The trial is postponed while Archer leads the crew in defense of the ship. Malory lures the attackers into the Holodeck which is outfitted like a western saloon, and Cyril kills all the pirates as they stream in. Barry 6 challenges Archer to a one-on-one battle while activating the MV Seamus self-destruct system, setting the timer for 2 minutes. Archer orders the crew to get to the escape pod despite Malory's refusal to leave Archer alone. As the crew flies off, Barry and Archer fight in the saloon and the spaceship explodes. Afterward, Archer has a flashback of many events in his life, culminating in him waking up from his coma in the hospital. Archer is incredulous when Malory tells him he's been there for 3 years. When Archer asks about Lana, Malory just says the important thing is that mother and son are together. The episode title is a reference to the movie Awakenings starring Robert De Niro.

== Reception ==
On the review aggregator website Rotten Tomatoes, 91% of 11 critics' reviews are positive, with an average rating of 6.90/10. The website's consensus reads: "Reinventing itself once more, Archer:1999 is a welcome addition to the series that retains the irreverent and outlandish humor of the original."
