= Archer season 9 =

Archer Danger Island
- Season 9
- Promotional poster
- No. of episodes: 8

Release
- Original network: FXX
- Original release: April 25 – June 13, 2018

Season chronology
- ← Previous; Archer Dreamland Next → Archer 1999

Archer Danger Island is the ninth season of the animated television series Archer, created by Adam Reed. The second part of the "coma dream" trilogy (preceded by Archer Dreamland and followed by Archer 1999), consisting of eight episodes, it aired from April 25 to June 13, 2018, on FXX.

== Production ==
FXX announced that season 9 would, like season 8, be set in a different time period with the same voice cast playing different versions of their characters. Within the series' primary continuity, Sterling Archer, who was found shot in actress Veronica Deane's pool at the climax of season seven, remains in a coma, and the events of this season are another extended dream.

The season also pays homage to the short-lived 1980s television series Tales of the Gold Monkey which featured a very similar premise to Danger Island. Adam Reed has previously claimed that Tales of the Gold Monkey was "one of my favorite shows ever."

== Synopsis ==
The season, set in spring 1939, sees Sterling Archer as an alcoholic seaplane pilot living on the lush and mysterious Pacific island of Mitimotu with Pam, his muscular co-pilot, and sidekick/best friend. Cheryl is cast as Charlotte Stratton, a honeymooner and a member of New York's high-class society who becomes stranded when her husband leaves after Archer sleeps with her, Malory is a fancy hotel owner and once more Archer's mother and employer, Ray is Capitaine Reynaud, a pompous French colonial gendarme, Cyril is Siegbert Fuchs, the Nazi spy posing as a local businessman, Lana is Princess Lanaluakalani of Mitimotu's Indigenous Polynesian population and Krieger is a sapient, wisecracking scarlet macaw named Crackers. Archer's nemesis is a German flying ace named Ziegler, who bears a striking resemblance to Barry. Ziegler shot Archer down five times during the Spanish Civil War due to the superiority of the German planes, one time causing Archer to lose an eye. Archer, his mother, Princess Lanaluakalani, and the Germans compete with each other to find a valuable idol rumored to be hidden on the island.

== Episodes ==
No. overall	No. in season	Title	Written by	Original release date	Prod. code	US viewers (millions)
94	1	"Strange Pilot"	Adam Reed	April 25, 2018	XAR09001	0.51
On the Pacific island and French colony of Mitimotu, seaplane pilot Archer spends a drunken night with newlywed Charlotte Stratton causing her husband to abandon her. Mitimotu's indigenous heiress Princess Lanaluakalani and local businessman Siegbert Fuchs charter his aging seaplane, the Loose Goose, for a flight around the island and they are accompanied by co-pilot Pam and the talking parrot companion Crackers. However, the plane has fuel problems so Archer arranges for Lana, Fuchs, and Pam to parachute back down to the island followed by Crackers. Just before the plane crashes, Archer manages to fix the problem and he keeps the plane aloft. Guest star: Jon Daly as Whitney Stratton IV
95	2	"Disheartening Situation"	Adam Reed	May 2, 2018	XAR09002	0.44
Lana, Fuchs, and Pam parachute down into Mitimotu Island's jungle but Fuchs has cracked ribs after an encounter with a huge tree python. Archer's plane is low on fuel so he crash-lands in the main street of Mitimotu, destroying property and his plane's wings. Meanwhile, Mother has been trying to convince Charlotte, the stranded and penniless honeymooner, to work as a prostitute. Archer and Capitaine Reynaud, the French gendarme, drive off into the jungle to find the survivors. They arrive just in time to rescue Lana, Fuchs, and Pam from huge Komodo dragons and return to town.
96	3	"Different Modes of Preparing the Fruit"	Adam Reed	May 9, 2018	XAR09003	0.36
The story continues after Archer and Pam have returned to the island to fix the damaged seaplane and Archer plans to follow up on rumors of a golden idol that was placed somewhere on the island. Meanwhile, Lana and Fuchs are having an affair with each other, who are revealed to be after the same item. That night Archer, Pam, and Crackers break into Fuchs' room and copy his map of the idol's location while Cheryl entertains Fuchs, but she passes out after drinking too much. The next morning, Archer discovers that Pam's poorly copied map is useless.
97	4	"A Warrior in Costume"	Adam Reed	May 16, 2018	XAR09004	0.41
While Pam repairs their plane's wings although Archer is critical of her workmanship, Archer's old nemesis, Ziegler, a German flying ace who shot Archer down five times during the Spanish Civil War, lands on the Island with a group of German soldiers. To get even with Ziegler, Archer takes off with Pam in one of the German planes and is followed by Ziegler. In the ensuing dogfight, Pam shoots down Ziegler's plane but Archer claims the credit. Unfortunately, their plane is damaged so Archer belly-lands into the ocean where they are soon surrounded by sharks. Guest star: Flula Borg as Ziegler
98	5	"Strange Doings in the Taboo Groves"	Adam Reed & Mike Arnold	May 23, 2018	XAR09005	0.33
Archer and Pam take off again in the Loose Goose to search for the rumored golden idol. They land the plane, but while trekking through the jungle they become caught in quicksand and are surrounded by aggressive monkeys. As their situation worsens, they blame each other for their predicament. Meanwhile, back in town, Malory, Capitaine Reynaud, and Charlotte drive out of town seeking the idol while Fuchs and the German soldiers do likewise. In the jungle, the monkeys are scared off by the arrival of the local Polynesian tribe, who kidnap Archer and Pam.
99	6	"Some Remarks on Cannibalism"	Adam Reed	May 30, 2018	XAR09006	0.37
Princess Lana's father berates her for showing Fuchs the map to the idol. She drives out into the jungle to stop Fuchs but runs into Malory's group. Crackers finds them and tells them of Archer and Pam's predicament, and Malory reluctantly agrees to detour and save them. Meanwhile, Archer and Pam have been captured by the local Mua Mua tribe who prepare to eat them. They meet Noah, an anthropologist studying the tribe, who says that he cannot interfere in the traditional ceremony. Archer and Pam free themselves, but Noah notices them trying to escape and tries to stop them, only for them to spill out the map of the idol's location, which Noah convinces them to let him join. When the trio is alerted of German soldiers coming near the camp to fend off an attack, only for them to be attacked by the Mua Mua for trying to escape, but after Archer saves them from being shot by a German soldier, they are invited to help the tribe wipe out the other Germans. Guest star: David Cross as Noah
100	7	"Comparative Wickedness of Civilized and Unenlightened Peoples"	Adam Reed	June 6, 2018	XAR09007	0.29
Unknown to Fuchs, Archer and Pam overheard the conversation, and were concerned that the Mua Mua and Noah to planning a strategy to defend themselves against the heavily armed Germans. Archer trains the tribe to prepare to defend the native village and set up booby traps against the Germans before they arrive. Meanwhile, Malory's group reunites with Archer and Pam and Lana is surprised when they treat Charlotte as a princess instead of her. When Fuchs has radioed for backup and a platoon of German stormtroopers lands on a nearby beach, the group successfully wipes out the German troops with the tribe's traps and defenses. Furious over the loss of his troops, Fuchs donned a powered exoskeleton inside one of the crate supplies and suited up to attack the village, only to be knocked away by the giant log with spikes. Later that night, Archer and the others join in the tribe's victory celebrations, unaware that Fuchs is still alive. Guest star: David Cross as Noah
101	8	"A Discovery"	Adam Reed	June 13, 2018	XAR09008	0.35
With Noah's help, Archer and the group continue on their search for the idol and come across an entrance to a cave under the volcano. Once inside, they find the idol, which is revealed to be carved out of uranium. Soon after, they are attacked by Fuchs who has followed them in his exoskeleton and uses it to safely acquire the idol, proclaiming that with the uranium to can create a superweapon for Germany. A shoot-out ensues, which is only interrupted by the volcano cracking open and exposing flows of lava. Pam, Sterling, and Fuchs fall into a crevasse and are only saved by hanging onto Pam who has a grip on the edge. However, Archer willingly lets go of Pam to prevent Fuchs from leaving with the idol resulting in him losing his grip and he and Fuchs plummet towards a pool of flowing lava. The episode ends with a scene that suddenly shifts to show Archer finds himself in a stasis pod aboard a spaceship. Guest star: David Cross as Noah

== Reception ==
On the review aggregator website Rotten Tomatoes, 67% of 12 critics' reviews are positive, with an average rating of 6.80/10. The website's consensus reads: "Though long-time fans may be frustrated by this slim diversion from Archer's main narrative, Danger Island gleefully colors outside the lines of 1930s serial tropes while incorporating many of the series' treasured jokes into a self-contained story."
