= Archer season 13 =

Archer
- Season 13
- No. of episodes: 8

Release
- Original network: FXX
- Original release: August 24 – October 12, 2022

Season chronology
- ← Previous; Season 12 Next → Season 14

The thirteenth season of the animated television series Archer, created by Adam Reed, aired on FXX from August 24 to October 12, 2022.

== Synopsis ==
The Agency has been acquired by the spy conglomerate known as IIA (International Intelligence Agency). As such, Archer and the gang struggle to find their identity while performing odd missions for Fabian Kingsworth, the leader of the IIA.

== Production ==
Archer season 13 was announced on September 28, 2021. This is the first season not to feature Jessica Walter in her role as Malory Archer, who died after recording her voice parts for season 12. The season also features Kayvan Novak's Fabian Kingsworth as a new main cast member, appearing in seven episodes of the eight-episode season, following a recurring role in season 12.

== Episodes ==
No. overall	No. in season	Title	Directed by	Written by	Original release date	Prod. code	US viewers (millions)
127	1	"The Big Con"	Justin Wagner	Mark Ganek	August 24, 2022	XAR013001	0.29
The Agency, the new subsidiary of IIA after the passing of Malory, appears at an industry conference with former international competitors and enemies. While searching for the party room(s), Pam inadvertently uncovers intrigue. Guest Star: Stephen Tobolowsky as Robert and Shohreh Aghdashloo as ClandestiCon Host
128	2	"Operation: Fang"	Matt Thompson	Matt Roller	August 31, 2022	XAR013002	0.27
Gillette is in charge of a creepy crawly mission in a tropical jungle.
129	3	"Saturday"	Pierre Cerrato	Asha Michelle Wilson	September 7, 2022	XAR013003	0.31
Archer and Lana get called into work on Saturday, forcing them onto a mission neither of them wants because he is hungover, and she must spend the day with her daughter AJ. Guest Star: Stephen Tobolowsky as Robert, Kenan Thompson as the Broker, Kimberly Woods as Abbiejean Kane-Archer
130	4	"Laws of Attraction"	Omaka Schultz	Brittany Miller	September 14, 2022	XAR013004	0.35
Fabian tasks The Agency with recovering a piece of valuable tech from a nefarious threat called The Invisible Hand. Guest Star: Alison Pill as Alessia
131	5	"Out of Network"	Megan Johnson	Matt Roller	September 21, 2022	XAR013005	0.27
Archer seeks professional help but IIA's health plan is murder. Guest Star: Missi Pyle as Dr. Malory Lacania
132	6	"Bank Run at Mr. Bank's Bank"	Kim Feigenbaum	Alison Silverman	September 28, 2022	XAR013006	0.22
Fabian tasks the crew to retrieve the contents of a safety deposit box. As an incentive, a successful mission will result in IIA giving back ownership of the agency with sufficient operations budget for 6 months.
133	7	"Distraction Action"	Casey Willis	Miles Woods	October 5, 2022	XAR013007	0.22
Archer has a brilliant plan to evade capture. There is only one problem, he refuses to follow it. Guest Stars: Stephen Tobolowsky as Robert, Kimberly Woods as Abbiejean Kane-Archer, Alison Pill as Alessia, Christian Slater as Slater and Maggie Wheeler as Trinette McGoon
134	8	"Dough, Ray, and Me"	Stephen Slesinski	Mark Ganek	October 12, 2022	XAR013008	0.22
Archer and the gang need proof in order to temper expectations and ice the mission. Guest Stars: Christian Slater as Slater
