= Archer season 6 =

Archer
- Season 6
- DVD cover
- Starring: H. Jon Benjamin; Judy Greer; Amber Nash; Chris Parnell; Aisha Tyler; Lucky Yates; Jessica Walter
- No. of episodes: 13

Release
- Original network: FX
- Original release: January 8 – April 2, 2015

Season chronology
- ← Previous; Archer Vice Next → Season 7

The sixth season of the American animated comedy television series Archer, created by Adam Reed, aired in the United States on FX from January 8 to April 2, 2015, consisting of 13 episodes.

== Production ==
In March 2014, FX ordered a sixth season, consisting of 13 episodes.

In October 2014, creator Adam Reed confirmed that the spy agency would no longer be known as "ISIS" due to the acronym's association with the jihadist group Islamic State of Iraq and Syria.

The season premiered on January 8, 2015.

Shortly after episode 2 aired, a viewer noticed that a serial number featured on computer screen in the episode was actually hexadecimal ASCII code for a website URL. This URL was the first step in an extensive interactive online "scavenger hunt" which animator Mark Paterson had devised as a side project to the season, which was awarded the Primetime Emmy Award for Outstanding Interactive Program for 2015.

== Episodes ==
No. overall	No. in season	Title	Written by	Original release date	Prod. code	US viewers (millions)
63	1	"The Holdout"	Adam Reed	January 8, 2015	XAR06001	1.51
On his first mission for the CIA, Archer searches a jungle in Borneo for a crashed plane carrying sensitive information. He is ambushed by a Japanese soldier named Sato Kentaro, who has been marooned on the island and still believes the war is being fought. After saving Archer from guerrillas, "Ken" finds videos of the atomic bombings of Hiroshima and Nagasaki on Archer's phone and, at first, attacks him, but later, accompanies him. The two complete the mission, and Archer reconnects Ken with his family. Meanwhile, back home, Cheryl and Pam have renovated the futuristic office for Malory, who then realizes it is simply a hologram over the pre-ISIS office – only a copier-shaped toaster robot named Milton and a secret Sentō have been added.
64	2	"Three to Tango"	Adam Reed	January 15, 2015	XAR06002	0.90
Slater has an assignment for Archer and Lana: extract a freelance CIA agent stranded in Buenos Aires. That agent happens to be Conway Stern, who stole the whisper drive to sell to the Chinese government. Conway was a decoy set up by the CIA to ensure the safety of the real plans. After Archer and Conway fight upon seeing each other, Conway tells them he was sent to retrieve a computer file with the identities of every CIA operative in Central and South America and that he needs their help. Ultimately, Conway double-crosses them, intending to sell the files to the Russians. Back home, the search is on for A.J., who has gone missing. She is found in Krieger's lab, where she was taken for research for Krieger's "Cyberneddly Teddly" cyborg, which he has completed. Special guest stars: Christian Slater as Slater and Coby Bell as Conway Stern
65	3	"The Archer Sanction"	Adam Reed	January 22, 2015	XAR06003	0.88
Lana, Archer, and Ray travel to a mountain climbing resort in the Alps to kill an assassin. Only Archer has forgotten the mission dossier, leaving them without the target's name. They meet the climbing party: Crash McCarren, Mario Sevino of Italy, Michiko Ishikawa of Japan, and Hans Hessler of Germany. Archer then recalls the target being from an Axis powers nation. One by one, Michiko, Mario, and Hans mysteriously die. Archer gets Crash to admit that he is the assassin, that he is Irish, and killed all the other climbers, who were Interpol agents. Archer shoots him, despite being warned of a resulting avalanche. Back home, the gang breaks into Mallory's apartment, only to get poisoned. The title and plot of the episode are a reference to the 1972 novel The Eiger Sanction by Trevanian (the pen name of Rodney William Whitaker).
66	4	"Edie's Wedding"	Adam Reed	January 29, 2015	XAR06004	1.23
Pam's nasty sister Edie is getting married and has overlooked Pam for maid of honor in favor of a woman who stole her old boyfriend. Archer accompanies Pam to Wisconsin, only to be spotted in an airport by Barry Dylan. Barry later kidnaps Pam from the hotel, takes her to an abandoned silo, and calls Archer, who knocks out Edie when she refuses to help. At the farm, all engage in a verbal and physical fight until Pam saves Edie from Barry by shooting him with Archer's explosive shotgun shells. They set the building on fire, and the three leave Barry's mechanical, still-living endoskeleton behind. Special guest star: Allison Tolman as Edie Poovey
67	5	"Vision Quest"	Adam Reed & Ben Hoffman	February 5, 2015	XAR06005	0.98
Malory calls the team to the office for a 7:00 am meeting. They gather in the elevator for the ascent, and it gets stuck near the top floor. The team try to escape the elevator without success but end up at each other's throats. They are rescued just before they do any serious harm to each other when Malory arrives to run a team-building exercise she had planned for that morning.
68	6	"Sitting"	Adam Reed	February 12, 2015	XAR06006	0.81
Lana leaves A.J. in Archer's care and leaves for a 1 day seminar. After she leaves, Slater arrives at the apartment with a bullet wound and a Pakistani agent, named Farooq, needing a safe house. Farooq later forces Archer at gunpoint to drive him to the office to hack the mainframe with A.J. in tow and they arrive to find the team playing poker. Archer tries to play the hero and gets shot while the team take cover and Pam takes A.J. to the top of the building, à la King Kong. Lana later arrives at the office and reveals that the whole episode was a ruse to test Archer's baby-sitting abilities. Guest stars: Christian Slater as Slater and Kumail Nanjiani as Farooq Ashkani
69	7	"Nellis"	Adam Reed	February 19, 2015	XAR06007	1.08
After Archer goes on a drunken bender in Vegas and gets put on the no-fly and no-train lists due to his drunken behavior, he asks Cheryl to send her family's private jet, the Sky Tunt to fly him home. However, Ray flies the plane too close to Area 51's air space, where they're hit with a missile and forced to land at Area 51. Archer pretends to be CIA Agent Slater and while on the base, Pam and Krieger encounter aliens, but no-one else in the team believes them. Archer helps them steal an Air Force plane so they can fly back home. Meanwhile back in the office, Malory offers Lana $25,000-plus for naming rights to AJ's middle name.
70	8	"The Kanes"	Adam Reed	February 26, 2015	XAR06008	1.08
Lana and Archer travel to Berkeley so that her parents can meet their granddaughter. When a team of masked gunmen steals Lana's microbiologist father's research, Archer and the Kanes give chase through the streets of San Francisco in a scene straight out of Bullitt, exposing Lana's career as a spy. Meanwhile, Krieger, Pam, Cheryl, Cyril, and Krieger's Virtual Girlfriend run out of gas in the ghetto on their way to league bowling night. Guest stars: Christian Slater as Slater, Keith David as Lemuel Kane and C.C.H. Pounder as Claudette Kane
71	9	"Pocket Listing"	Adam Reed	March 5, 2015	XAR06009	0.92
Slater has the gang swindle the Durhani royal family and Gillette lends a hand. The group attempts to steal the hand prints and retinal scans of the Prince of Durhan during a tour of Tunt Manor, but Archer manages to create an international incident. Special guest star: Christian Slater as Slater
72	10	"Reignition Sequence"	Adam Reed	March 12, 2015	XAR06010	1.07
Shocked and disgusted by Archer and Lana's renewed romance, Cyril, Ray, Pam, Cheryl, and Krieger conspire to drive a wedge in between the couple by contacting Katya Kasanova from Archer's past. However, even after seeing her in his apartment, Archer decides to remain loyal to Lana. Unfortunately Lana discovers Katya was there and accuses Archer of being unfaithful. Special guest star: Ona Grauer as Katya Kasanova
73	11	"Achub Y Morfilod"	Adam Reed & Mike Arnold; Story inspiration from a rousing tale by : Matthew Rhys	March 19, 2015	XAR06011	0.84
Archer takes Lana to Wales for a romantic getaway to make up for the incident with Katya but they get involved with two Welsh separatists. Things go from bad to worse when an MI5 agent arrives at their cottage. Guest star: Matthew Rhys as Lloyd Llewellyn
74	12	"Drastic Voyage: Part I"	Adam Reed & Casey Willis	March 26, 2015	XAR06012	0.79
To save the life of a preeminent scientist who has discovered miniaturization, the team must enter his body and destroy a blood clot. Guest stars: Christian Slater as Slater, Gary Cole as Special Agent Hawley, Carrie Brownstein as Dr. Sklodowska, Michael Gray as TV's Michael Gray, and Ron Leibman as Ron Cadillac
75	13	"Drastic Voyage: Part II"	Adam Reed & Casey Willis	April 2, 2015	XAR06013	0.72
The team's mission inside Dr. Kovacs goes awry, and they are blacklisted by the CIA. Guest stars: Christian Slater as Slater, Gary Cole as Special Agent Hawley, Carrie Brownstein as Dr. Sklodowska and Michael Gray as TV's Michael Gray

== Home media ==
Archer: The Complete Season 6
Set details	Special features	
13 episodes; 2-disc set; 16:9 aspect ratio; Languages: English Dolby Digital 5.1; Subtitles: English SDH; Spanish; French	Conan & Archer Battle Russian Mobsters; Slay-J; Cooking with Milton	
DVD release dates
Region 1	Region 2	Region 4
March 29, 2016	TBA	TBA
