= Archer season 2 =

Archer
- Season 2
- DVD cover
- Starring: H. Jon Benjamin; Judy Greer; Amber Nash; Chris Parnell; Aisha Tyler; Jessica Walter
- No. of episodes: 13

Release
- Original network: FX
- Original release: January 27 – April 21, 2011

Season chronology
- ← Previous; Season 1 Next → Season 3

The second season of the animated television series, Archer originally aired in the United States on the cable network FX. This season started on January 27, 2011, with "Swiss Miss" and ended with "Double Trouble" on April 21, 2011, with a total of thirteen episodes.

== Episodes ==
No. overall	No. in season	Title	Written by	Original release date	Prod. code	US viewers (millions)
11	1	"Swiss Miss"	Story by : Mehar Sethi; Teleplay by : Adam Reed	January 27, 2011	XAR02002	1.53
Weakened by the recession, Malory institutes pay cuts in addition to seeking outside investment. Tasked with protecting the flirtatious 16-year-old daughter of a wealthy German dignitary, Anka (voiced by Kari Wahlgren), Archer finds the girl to be more trouble than she's worth.
12	2	"A Going Concern"	Adam Reed	February 3, 2011	XAR02006	1.11
With her fortune wiped out by a ponzi scheme, Malory plans to sell ISIS to ODIN so Archer takes drastic measures to stop it, including using the modified Ludovico technique. Special guest star: Jeffrey Tambor as Len Trexler
13	3	"Blood Test"	Adam Reed	February 10, 2011	XAR02001	1.12
Archer's favorite hooker Trinette claims that he fathered her child, Seamus.
14	4	"Pipeline Fever"	Story by : Boswell Cocker; Teleplay by : Adam Reed	February 17, 2011	XAR02007	0.99
Archer and Lana travel to the bayou to stop an eco-terrorist out to destroy a pipeline.
15	5	"The Double Deuce"	Adam Reed	February 24, 2011	XAR02004	1.00
When members of Woodhouse's old WWI unit die mysteriously, Archer discovers his valet's connection to the family.
16	6	"Tragical History"	Adam Reed	March 3, 2011	XAR02005	1.02
After being mocked as a failure one too many times by his coworkers, Cyril accepts an offer from a mysterious man (Peter Serafinowicz) to upload a computer virus into the ISIS mainframe so he can "save the day" by stopping it, only to find out he's become a pawn in a scheme to steal a list of undercover ISIS agents. Special guest star: Peter Serafinowicz as George Spelvin
17	7	"Movie Star"	Adam Reed	March 10, 2011	XAR02003	1.02
A Hollywood actress follows the gang on a mission to research a role. Special guest star: Rachael Harris as Rona Thorne
18	8	"Stage Two"	Adam Reed	March 17, 2011	XAR02008	0.93
When Malory suspects that she might have breast cancer, she undergoes a medical examination; Archer decides that he should be thoroughly checked for the disease as well.
19	9	"Placebo Effect"	Adam Reed	March 24, 2011	XAR02009	1.09
After discovering his cancer medication is fake, Archer goes on a murderous rampage against the Irish mob with Lana in tow.
20	10	"El Secuestro"	Adam Reed	March 31, 2011	XAR02010	1.32
When Pam is kidnapped, mistaken for Cheryl/Carol, ISIS discovers that Cheryl/Carol is really an heir to a billion-dollar empire and is being hunted by masked gunmen. Malory offers Cheryl/Carol ISIS as her personal bodyguard service, in exchange for financial compensation. Meanwhile, Archer and Ray attempt to rescue Pam while everyone else weighs the dollar-value of her life. (Spanish for "The Kidnapping")
21	11	"Jeu Monégasque"	Adam Reed	April 7, 2011	XAR02011	1.01
Malory and the ISIS agents travel to the Monte Carlo Grand Prix to recover another one of her sex tapes, but Archer loses all the blackmail money gambling and must enlist Ray and Lana's help to recover it before Malory finds out. (French for "Monaco Game") Special guest star: Peter Serafinowicz as Benoit
22	12	"White Nights"	Adam Reed	April 14, 2011	XAR02012	1.21
Archer's search for his father's identity takes him to Russia where he is held prisoner by KGB head Nikolai Jakov; Malory has to ask Archer's rival Barry Dylan to rescue him.
23	13	"Double Trouble"	Adam Reed	April 21, 2011	XAR02013	1.01
Krieger works to finish a top-secret project, and Archer brings a mysterious former KGB agent named Katya Kasanova home to meet Malory, unaware that Barry Dylan is on his way to kill him. Special guest star: Ona Grauer as Katya Kasanova

== Home media ==
Archer: The Complete Season Two
Set details	Special features	
13 episodes; 2-disc set; 16:9 aspect ratio; Languages: English; Subtitles; English; French; Spanish	Archersaurus - Self Extinction; Ask Archer; Semper Fi; L'espion Mal Fait; ISIS infiltrates Comic-con	
DVD release dates
Region 1	Region 2	Region 4
December 27, 2011	March 26, 2012	February 29, 2012
