= Archer season 7 =

Archer
- Season 7
- DVD cover
- Starring: H. Jon Benjamin; Judy Greer; Amber Nash; Chris Parnell; Aisha Tyler; Lucky Yates; Jessica Walter; Adam Reed
- No. of episodes: 10

Release
- Original network: FX
- Original release: March 31 – June 2, 2016

Season chronology
- ← Previous; Season 6 Next → Archer Dreamland

The seventh season of the animated television series, Archer, created by Adam Reed, aired on FX from March 31 to June 2, 2016. It was originally planned to consist of 13 episodes; however, it was later changed to 10.

== Premise ==
Following the ousting of the ISIS employees from their CIA freelance work, everyone has relocated from New York to Los Angeles. Cyril Figgis, possessing a requisite law degree, has opened a boutique Private Investigation agency (The Cyril Figgis Agency) in Hollywood. Cyril's authority is constantly undermined by everyone, and Mallory continues to assume the primary leadership role.

Though some of the season is episodic, a serial plot line is established early and is ultimately paid off in the two-part finale.

Whether Archer was going to continue beyond season-7 was unknown during the writing process, leading show runner Adam Reed to write a season finale that could have served as a conclusion for the series or a cliffhanger heading into season-8.

In June, 2016, FX announced it had renewed Archer for an additional three seasons, ensuring the show would continue through at least season 10.

== Production ==
The show's seventh season changes its setting from New York City to Los Angeles and follows the main characters as they run a private investigation agency in Hollywood.

While developing the season, the creative team took inspiration from Magnum, P.I. when writing the stories and they also used the series' location switch to change the series from the 1960s-aesthetic of prior seasons forward to 1970s-style, which included new clothing for the main characters.

The seventh season also marked the first time the show had a composer, J. G. Thirlwell, scoring the soundtrack for the season, a notable difference from previous seasons, in which only the opening and ending music themes were made by composers (Scott Sims and Mel Young, respectively), and the episodes used stock library music.

On February 1, 2016, a trailer for the show's seventh season was released. The trailer was a shot-for-shot remake of the opening scene of Magnum, P.I. Later that month, pictures of female Archer characters appeared in both the online and print versions of the 2016 Sports Illustrated Swimsuit Issue. On March 11, 2016, a new trailer for the show—a PSA in which Sterling and Lana instruct the audience at a movie theater to turn off their cell phones—began airing.

Following on from the successful scavenger hunt in Season 6, animator Mark Paterson devised an even more intricate hunt for Season 7, calling it "the most elaborate alternate reality game in television history" and including hidden clues or puzzles in every episode. It won the Primetime Emmy Award for Outstanding Interactive Program for 2016.

== Episodes ==
No. overall	No. in season	Title	Written by	Original release date	Prod. code	US viewers (millions)
76	1	"The Figgis Agency"	Adam Reed	March 31, 2016	XAR07001	1.07
Having lost their contract to work with the CIA, the group set up a detective agency called Figgis because Cyril Figgis is the only one with a license. They are hired by a heavily disguised Veronica Deane to break into her lawyer Alan Shapiro's mansion in the Hollywood Hills to retrieve a data disc. They complete the job although Sterling is heavily battered after falling down the rocky and heavily vegetated embankment. Guest stars: Ona Grauer as Veronica Deane Impersonator, Keegan-Michael Key as Detective Diedrich, Patton Oswalt as Alan Shapiro and J.K. Simmons as Detective Harris
77	2	"The Handoff"	Adam Reed	April 7, 2016	XAR07002	0.75
The real Veronica Deane hires the agency to retrieve her data disc which is now in the hands of a blackmailer. Sterling and Lana make a tricky handoff to retrieve the disc with a gang of bikers where Sterling gets beaten up even more. They are saved when the rest of the gang comes to their rescue after hearing Sterling being beaten up on his phone. Guest star: Patton Oswalt as Alan Shapiro
78	3	"Deadly Prep"	Adam Reed	April 14, 2016	XAR07003	0.79
Sterling and Lana go to an exclusive childcare centre to secure a place for AJ, and Sterling discovers that Ivy Stratton, one of the two bullies who hazed him at prep school, is one of the owners. Stratton says he is dying of cancer and wants Sterling to kill him in a fake home invasion so his wife will get his life insurance money. However, Sterling arrives that night to find Trent Whitney, the other bully who has been having an affair with Stratton's wife. Stratton shoots Whitney with a long-range rifle and tries to shoot Sterling but he is killed later in an ensuing car chase with Sterling. Guest stars: Jon Daly as Richard "Ivy" Stratton IV, Jon Glaser as Trent Whitney, and Keegan-Michael Key as Detective Diedrich
79	4	"Motherless Child"	Adam Reed	April 21, 2016	XAR07004	0.79
A heavily bandaged Barry seeks Sterling's help in finding his birth mother. To encourage Sterling to agree he locks Malory Archer in an underground chamber with a limited air supply. The gang finds the location of Barry's mother, but Barry is hit by a car as he leaves the building to visit her. Meanwhile, Malory frees herself and gives a trucker a painful lesson in how to treat women. Guest stars: Ron Leibman as Ron Cadillac and Dave Willis as Barry Dylan
80	5	"Bel Panto: Part I"	Adam Reed	April 28, 2016	XAR07005	0.68
Veronica Deane's lawyer, Alan Shapiro, hires the Figgis agency to protect a valuable emerald necklace that Veronica will wear at a fundraiser. A group of Evil clown-masked hoodlums crash the party and demand the necklace. Guest stars: John O'Hurley as Ellis Crane and Patton Oswalt as Alan Shapiro
81	6	"Bel Panto: Part II"	Adam Reed	May 5, 2016	XAR07006	0.83
Sterling, Lana, and Pam each overcome a clown and then don their disguises and end up fighting each other. The remaining criminals escape by pretending to be hostages. Meanwhile, Sterling discovers that the lawyer Shapiro planned the whole robbery in an attempt to get the insurance money to save Veronica Deane from bankruptcy and hoped the Figgis Agency would fail. Guest stars: Keegan-Michael Key as Detective Diedrich, John O'Hurley as Ellis Crane, Patton Oswalt as Alan Shapiro, and J.K. Simmons as Detective Harris
82	7	"Double Indecency"	Adam Reed	May 12, 2016	XAR07007	0.76
Quite separately, film producer Donald Zissner and his wife Barbie each hire the agency to confirm whether their spouse is cheating. Someone from the gang must successfully seduce them to confirm it so Cyril and Krieger, Pam, and Cheryl are selected to complete the assignment. The mission comes undone when they all arrive at the hotel at the same time as the Zissners. Guest stars: Nika Futterman as Barbie Zissner and Fred Tatasciore as Donald Zissner
83	8	"Liquid Lunch"	Adam Reed	May 19, 2016	XAR07008	0.70
Slater hires the Figgis Agency to prevent a former CIA agent from assassinating a visiting Soviet dignitary. While interrogating a source, Slater gives Sterling a taste of "waterboarding" which leaves him completely traumatized. Out on the job, Sterling and Lana constantly argue over his stolen kiss with Veronica Deane, jeopardizing the mission and losing out on their payment. Lana suggests that she and Sterling take a break. Guest star: Christian Slater as Slater
84	9	"Deadly Velvet: Part I"	Adam Reed	May 26, 2016	XAR07009	0.76
The Figgis Agency is hired by Ellis Crane to find out who has been sabotaging his new film Deadly Velvet. The members of the agency go undercover and Sterling makes a play for Veronica Deane while Lana gets friendly with Ellis Crane. Once the film entered production, however, the set was plagued with unfortunate circumstances. While Shapiro tries to stop them with the help of Pam and Cheryl, Lana finds Archer in Veronica's dressing room naked and accuses him of having an affair with her. Cyril uncovers what looks like an insurance scam by Ellis to make a fortune if the film is not completed, only to discover that he is found shot dead by an unknown killer. The next day, Detective Diedrich and Harris inform them about Ellis' murder and they are all suspects. Guest stars: Keegan-Michael Key as Detective Diedrich, John O'Hurley as Ellis Crane, Patton Oswalt as Alan Shapiro, and J.K. Simmons as Detective Harris
85	10	"Deadly Velvet: Part II"	Adam Reed	June 2, 2016	XAR07010	0.71
Lana is arrested for the murder of Ellis Crane, but Sterling suspects Veronica Deane. Sterling releases one of Krieger's androids that looks like him which he takes with him to confront Veronica to confess her crimes. She explained that the entire movie set Deadly Velvet was a scam that Veronica and her ex-husband set up to get millions of dollars from insurance fraud, but Ellis cuts her out of the deal. This causes Veronica to murder him out of resentment and attempts to frame Lana for it. Realizing her confession, Veronica shoots Sterling and falls into the pool, but then also shoots the second Sterling and flees. When the police and the gang arrive, they discover that Sterling is the android, and the real Sterling, who was apparently shot and killed, is floating lifeless in the pool. Guest stars: Keegan-Michael Key as Detective Diedrich, Patton Oswalt as Alan Shapiro, and J.K. Simmons as Detective Harris

== Home media ==
Archer: The Complete Season Seven
Set details	Special features	
10 episodes; 2-disc set; 16:9 aspect ratio; Languages: English Dolby Digital 5.1; Subtitles: English SDH; Spanish; French	Archer Reviews Bond; Archer Live! Reading (Table Read from San Diego Comic Con)	
DVD release dates
Region 1	Region 2	Region 4
March 28, 2017	TBA	TBA
