= High Noon Toons =

- Haas from High Noon Toons
- Created by: Matt Thompson
- Voices of: Matt Thompson; Adam Reed
- Country of origin: United States

Production
- Running time: 3 hours

Original release
- Network: Cartoon Network
- Release: 1994 – 1996

High Noon Toons was a three-hour programming block of cartoons hosted by two cowboy hand puppets named Haas and Lil' Jo (a Bonanza reference) shown on Cartoon Network in the mid-1990s. The series was made by Matt Thompson and Adam Reed, who later went on to create adult-themed cartoon series such as Sealab 2021 and Frisky Dingo for Adult Swim and Archer for FX.

Often the show had special themes, such as "Quick Draw McGraw: Pure Mustang". Haas and Lil' Jo also hosted Cartoon Network's "Spring Break '95", with the two on a beach setting with bikini-clad Barbie dolls, and which showed Spring Break-related cartoons. They also hosted the Thanksgiving Cartoon Parade in 1995.

== Creation and cancellation ==
Matt Thompson had been working for Turner for a while already in the early 1990s, when his boss at Cartoon Network liked his sense of humor. Thompson was then asked to come up with some funny interstitial material for a new three-hour block of cartoons. When it came time to present, he was so hungover from the night before that he had actually failed to come up with any ideas, so he simply started making his hand talk like a puppet. The hand puppets were a hit, and Thompson was ordered to write 500 jokes to fill 10 to 15 seconds of filler time from the noon to 3 p.m. time slot. He recruited his friend Adam Reed for the other hand puppet and the show was complete.

Thompson and Reed were often drunk while making the show, and were eventually reprimanded for drinking on the job after setting a prop spaceship on fire.
