= Sealab =

Sealab may refer to:

- SEALAB I, II and III, underwater habitats developed by the United States Navy
- Sealab 2020, a Hanna-Barbera cartoon about an underwater research base that aired in 1972 in the United States
- Sealab 2021, a parody of Sealab 2020 broadcast on the Cartoon Network, first aired in 2000
