= America: The Motion Picture =

- Official release poster
- Directed by: Matt Thompson
- Written by: Dave Callaham
- Produced by: Phil Lord; Christopher Miller; Will Allegra; Channing Tatum; Peter Kiernan; Reid Carolin; Matt Thompson; Eric Sims; Dave Callaham; Christian Danley; Neal Holman
- Starring: Channing Tatum; Jason Mantzoukas; Olivia Munn; Bobby Moynihan; Judy Greer; Will Forte; Raoul Max Trujillo; Killer Mike; Simon Pegg; Andy Samberg
- Edited by: Christian Danley
- Music by: Mark Mothersbaugh
- Production companies: Netflix Animation Studios; Lord Miller Productions; Free Association; Floyd County Productions; Jittery Dog Productions
- Distributed by: Netflix
- Release date: June 30, 2021
- Running time: 98 minutes
- Country: United States
- Language: English

America: The Motion Picture is a 2021 American adult animated comedy film directed by Matt Thompson (in his feature directorial debut) and written by Dave Callaham, who both also produce. It stars Channing Tatum (also a producer), Jason Mantzoukas, Olivia Munn, Bobby Moynihan, Judy Greer, Will Forte, Raoul Max Trujillo, Killer Mike, Simon Pegg and Andy Samberg. It is an R-rated, animated parody of George Washington and his fight against the British. The film uses anachronism, ahistoricism, and Americentrism to create a comic effect. Dates, the roles of various historical figures, battles, notable inventions and technologies are changed, reinvented or outright created. Prominent events and figures from the American Revolutionary War period and American history through to the 20th century are moved into the film's 1776 setting.

Netflix released America: The Motion Picture in streaming on June 30, 2021. It received generally negative reviews from film critics, who panned the script and humor.

== Plot ==
In July 1776, after signing the Declaration of Independence, Benedict Arnold murders all of its signatories, blows up Independence Hall, and steals the Declaration. At Ford's Theatre, George Washington and his childhood best friend, Abraham Lincoln, watch a play. Arnold appears there, turns into a werewolf and bites off Lincoln's neck. Before dying, Lincoln asks Washington to bring the American Revolutionary War to an end, naming the future country "America." Washington chases Arnold, killing his soldiers but failing to kill him.

At Lincoln's funeral, Washington meets Martha Dandridge. She urges him to continue the revolution after the two have sex. Washington teams up with party animal Samuel Adams, and they recruit equestrian champion Paul Revere. They endeavor to recruit female Chinese scientist Thomas Edison, only to find that she is being executed by the British for testing science. However, she escapes and agrees to join George's team. They then get Native American hunter Geronimo, who has more knowledge about the land than anyone, to join them.

They track down Arnold at a Vietnam bar. Although the enemy has fled and Edison blows up the bar, they conclude that the events in Vietnam were not a failure. The team then visits blacksmith John Henry, who is to make a silver bullet for them to kill Arnold. To get the silver, they go to Boston to steal silver spoons from the Titanic. On board the ship, they learn that the British are bathing people in tea so they will come over to their side. They also discover plans for a secret British superweapon but fail to retrieve it because Washington accidentally spills tea everywhere, causing a fire that sinks the ship. Adams then proposes to the others that they will say the Titanic hit an iceberg and that they were never there.

Arnold kidnaps Martha, who is to become the future wife of King James. Washington finds out about a Gettysburg Address where Arnold meets the king at a secret meeting. It turns out to be an ambush and Revere's horse dies sacrificing himself. King James appears at the Gettysburg address in the form of a hologram and offers Washington a battle the next morning at Attrition field; Washington agrees. However, Arnold usurps and kills the king to take over the world himself.

The next day, the British army (Note: Which includes Elizabeth Tower in the form of a Transformer, London buses in the form of AT-ATs, and Arnold flying in a crown-shaped ship with a Venus flytrap like soccer ball.) stands up against the American army which was hastily assembled by Washington. (Note: It includes a hundred-foot tall Paul Bunyan and Babe the Blue Ox, as well as Indians, Mexicans, African Americans, Asians, Arabs, ravers, and Revere, who had fused his back with what was left of Clyde with nano-cybernetic technology by Clara Barton, and Johnny Appleseed.) The superweapon turns out to be a way of tainting the clouds with tea creating a tea rain that will turn the Americans British. Edison, thanks to the power of science, uses the British weapons against them, turning tea into beer. When the beer rain falls, the British transform into bros. It also cures Martha, who had been turned British before the battle, changing her into a living Statue of Liberty. A final battle occurs with Arnold, who turns himself into a mega-wolf and, after Washington restrains him, is eventually defeated with a silver bullet from Henry, who kills him with America's favorite pastime. Days later, a ceremony is held for people to watch Adams blow up Arnold's Monument.

Six months later, on July 4, 1776, Washington inaugurated the grand opening of America at the monument of his name. As Washington plans for I. M. Pei to build another memorial for his best friend to stare at his monument, the spirit of Lincoln comes back. It gives him the Declaration, repaired with tape, while Adams becomes the uncle for George's newborn son, Denzel. The inauguration goes as planned, but is disrupted when the crowd engages in a political fight with each other, arguing over freeing the slaves, racism, women's rights, giving back the land to the natives, right to keep and bear arms, same-sex marriage, religious beliefs, free health care, and fair trials, making Washington nervous about the future of the country.

== Voice cast ==
- Channing Tatum as George Washington
- Jason Mantzoukas as Samuel "Uncle Sam" Adams
- Olivia Munn as a tomboyish female version of Thomas Edison
- Bobby Moynihan as Paul Revere
- Judy Greer as Martha Washington
- Will Forte as Abraham "Abe" Lincoln; Forte reprises his role from previous Lord Miller projects such as Clone High (2002–2003, 2023), The Lego Movie films (2014–2019) and Michelangelo and Lincoln: History Cops (2014).
- Raoul Max Trujillo as Geronimo
- Killer Mike as John Henry / Blacksmith
- Simon Pegg as James VI and I
- Andy Samberg as Benedict "Cosby" Arnold
- Carlos Alazraqui as Clyde
- Dave Callaham as I. M. Pei / LGBTQ rights activist
- Jeff Fastner as Ben Franklin
- Kevin Gillese as John Wilkes Booth / Titanic guard
- Zebbie Gillese as Transporter / Bros / Manchester the Soccer Ball
- J. Larose as Native American rights activist
- Megan Leahy as Clara Barton
- Amber Nash as women's rights activist / Anti-LGBTQ rights activist
- Eric Sims as Thomas Jefferson
- Mike Schatz as Fredrick Xavier Kinko / Hancock Supporter
- Matt Thompson as John Hancock / Colonist / Stand Your Ground rights activist
- Lucky Yates as Baseball Announcer / 2nd amendment rights activist

== Production ==
In March 2017, producers Phil Lord and Christopher Miller announced that they would produce an R-rated animated Netflix original film called America: The Motion Picture with Will Allegra, Matt Thompson, Adam Reed, Channing Tatum, Reid Carolin and Peter Kiernan. The screenplay was written by David Callaham and Thompson was the director.

== Critical reception ==
On the review aggregator website Rotten Tomatoes, 35% of 49 critics' reviews are positive, with an average rating of 5/10. The website's critics consensus reads, "America: The Motion Picture is definitely outrageous and possibly patriotic—problem is, it's also not very funny." On Metacritic, the film has a weighted average score of 38 out of 100 based on 18 critics, indicating "generally unfavorable" reviews.

Amy Nicholson of The New York Times described the film as "a raunchy, aggressively inane cartoon that flips the bird—both onscreen and thematically—to a strain of patriotism that insists that the slave owners who started this country were sober-minded heroes whose vision of democracy remains flawless, bro." Inkoo Kang of The Washington Post gave the film a score of 1.5/4 stars saying, "The gulf between stupid-smart and just plain stupid feels immeasurably vast when watching America: The Motion Picture, which is clearly aiming for the former but lands squarely in the latter." Brian Lowry of CNN described the film as "a movie that's loud and annoying more than truly provocative, peppered with pop-culture references that prove cleverer than its rewrite of US history."

Steve Greene of IndieWire gave the film a grade of C, describing it as "a goofy mishmash of riffs on prominent historical figures", and added: "Most of the time, it's knowingly stupid, which makes watching it 90 minutes of occasional fun and frequent indifference." Melanie McFarland of Salon.com wrote: "Rarely have I seen a movie so confident that its viewers not only revel in American benightedness but are eager to identify with it"; she described the film as "not only a waste of time but an insult to ignoramuses."

Bill Goodykoontz of The Arizona Republic gave the film a score of 2.5/5 stars, writing that it "goes all in on its deranged version of the founding of the nation", but added: "It wears you down over time, but especially early on it's too satisfied just to be shocking and irreverent."

Michael Nordine of Variety was more positive in his review and wrote, "Though loyalists and sticklers for historical accuracy may not consider it their cup of tea, America will likely win over anyone who knows not to take it too seriously." Randy Myers of The Mercury News gave the film a score of 3/4 stars writing, "Even when you think it's only acting rude and juvenile just because, it's much smarter than that, particularly whenever it skewers American attitudes (both conservative and liberal)."
