= List of Sealab 2021 episodes =

This is an episode list for the American adult animated television series Sealab 2021. Cartoon Network aired the show's first three episodes in December 2000, with the remaining episodes airing on Adult Swim from September 2, 2001, to April 24, 2005. 52 episodes and four seasons in total were produced.

== Series overview ==
Season	Episodes	Originally released	
Season	Episodes	First released	Last released
Pilot		Unaired	
1	13	December 21, 2000	May 5, 2002
2	13	May 12, 2002	November 16, 2003
3	13	November 23, 2003	July 18, 2004
4	13	November 14, 2004	April 24, 2005

== Episodes ==
=== Original pilot ===
An untitled pitch pilot for the series was produced, and while never aired on television, it was later released on the Season 1 DVD.

Title	Written by	Original air date	Production code
"Pitch Pilot"	Adam Reed & Matt Thompson	Unaired	2000
Two scientists are stuck on an iceberg in Antarctica. They call for Sealab's help, but the Sealab crew has other more important issues. For example, Marco thinks he is a salad, Sparks interrupts the call by watching porn, and Turtle races.

=== Season 1 (2000–02) ===
Prior to the creation of the Adult Swim programming block, three episodes aired at various early morning times on Cartoon Network.

No. overall	No. in season	Title	Written by	Original release date	Prod. code
1	1	"Radio Free Sealab"	John J. Miller, Adam Reed, Matt Thompson	December 21, 2000 (on Cartoon Network)	2003
Murphy starts a pirate radio station, which attracts the attention of the FCC.
2	2	"I, Robot"	John J. Miller, Adam Reed, Matt Thompson	December 30, 2000 (on Cartoon Network)	2001
While the station is in danger from a hull breach, the crew ponders what life would be like if they put their brains inside robot bodies. The episode's title was based on the novel of the same name by Isaac Asimov.
3	3	"Happycake"	John J. Miller, Adam Reed, Matt Thompson	December 30, 2000 (on Cartoon Network)	2002
Murphy complains about his stolen Happy Cake oven, while Sparks shows off his mountain fortress.
4	4	"Chickmate"	mc chris, Adam Reed, Matt Thompson, John J. Miller	September 2, 2001	2101
Debbie's "biological clock" goes off, and she tries to find a crew member that would make a good father for her as-yet-unconceived baby.
5	5	"Predator"	Mc chris, Adam Reed, Matt Thompson, John J. Miller	September 16, 2001	2102
A pseudo-invisible monster (reminiscent of the monster from the movie Predator) is on a killing spree in Sealab. At the beginning of the episode, Captain Murphy can be seen watching episodes of The Brak Show, Space Ghost Coast to Coast, and Aqua Teen Hunger Force.
6	6	"Lost in Time"	Mc chris, Adam Reed, Matt Thompson, John J. Miller	September 30, 2001	2103
While receiving unlicensed cable feeds for Captain Murphy, Quinn and Stormy are caught in a 15-minute time warp as Sealab continually blows up.
7	7	"Little Orphan Angry"	Mc chris, John J. Miller, Adam Reed, Matt Thompson	October 14, 2001	2104
An "orphan" comes aboard Sealab, courtesy of the Final Request Foundation, with sinister plans in his mind. The episode title is a parody of "Little Orphan Annie".
8	8	"Waking Quinn"	Mc chris, Adam Reed, Matt Thompson, John J. Miller	October 21, 2001	2105
Electrically shocked in the station's tank room, Quinn drifts in and out of consciousness, dreaming a series of bizarre stories. The title and the episode are an homage to the film Waking Life.
9	9	"All That Jazz"	Mc chris, Adam Reed, Matt Thompson, John J. Miller, Matt Maiellaro, Dave Willis	October 28, 2001	2106
Murphy is trapped by an evil soda machine, while the rest of the crew goes out on tour with MC Chris as Butch Cassidy and the Sundance Kids. The jazz-themed machine sells Root Bird, Gilberto Grape (also a reference to a film titled What's Eating Gilbert Grape), Artie Shawberry, Kiwi Holiday, Peachmo, John Cola-Trane, Don Wild Cherry, Vince Guavaldi, Dave Bruberry, Cab Colaway, Dexterade, Nina Lemone, Mango Reinhardt, Getzberry, Fizzy Gillespie, Marian McPineapple, Or'ngette Coleman, and Mingus Dew. George Lowe guest-starred as Dick.
10	10	"Murphy Murph and the Feng Shui Bunch"	Mc chris, John J. Miller, Adam Reed, Matt Thompson, Matt Maiellaro, Dave Willis	December 9, 2001	2107
Murphy is sold on redecorating the station according to feng shui rules, but Quinn distrusts the guy doing the selling. A showdown between the decorator and Marco at the end of the episode reveals that the events of the episode in fact take place in a video game played by Master Shake and Meatwad of Aqua Teen Hunger Force. The episode title is a parody of early 1990s hip-hop band Marky Mark and the Funky Bunch.
11	11	"In the Closet"	Matt Thompson and Adam Reed	April 7, 2002	2201
Due to a faulty door, the Sealab crew gets locked in a tool closet. A few black eyes result as they try to get out, but then they discover that a pack of unfed killer dogs are running around Sealab.
12	12	"Stimutacs"	Matt Thompson and Adam Reed	April 28, 2002	2202
Sparks starts pushing a new, "mostly kelp" energy pill that proves to be highly addictive.
13	13	"Swimming in Oblivion"	Matt Thompson and Adam Reed	May 5, 2002	2203
Behind the scenes at the chaotic "set" of Sealab 2021. In this episode, the voice actors use their own names rather than the characters'. The episode title is a parody of Living in Oblivion by Tom DiCillo.

=== Season 2 (2002–03) ===
No. overall	No. in season	Title	Original release date	Prod. code
14	1	"Der Dieb"	May 12, 2002	2204
A series of unexplained thefts leads Murphy to declare "Martian law". In the ensuing madness, everyone ends up blaming Quinn for all the thefts.
15	2	"The Policy"	November 3, 2002	2206
After running up thousands of dollars in credit card debt, Murphy cannot come up with a way to pay for it all until Sparks intervenes. He takes out life insurance policies on the crew before sending them on a fatal fool's errand, and proceeds to kill Captain Murphy with a homemade tesla coil in the hot tub. However, Captain Murphy grabs Sparks as he is being electrocuted, killing Sparks as well.
16	3	"Hail, Squishface"	November 10, 2002	2208
A mysterious Asian visitor brings an irresistibly cute Gloop onto the station, which Murphy names Squishface. There are two problems, though: Gloops stink, and they multiply so fast that eventually Sealab is overrun with them. This episode parodies "The Trouble with Tribbles", Gremlins and Aliens.
17	4	"Bizarro"	November 17, 2002	2209
The crew are held hostage by Bizarro versions of themselves.
18	5	"Legend of Baggy Pants"	November 24, 2002	2205
After trying to start a game of golf next to the reactor core (and turning Hesh into Monster Hesh in the process), Murphy goes looking for the pro shop — and gets thoroughly lost in the process. The episode title parodies The Legend of Bagger Vance.
19	6	"Tinfins"	December 8, 2002	2210
The crew of Sealab (along with a vapid gossip-show host, a bear in lederhosen and guest stars Kid 'n Play) star in a sneak preview special for the movie Tinfins, complete with plenty of ads for the restaurant Grizzlebee's: "You'll wish you had less fun."
20	7	"7211"	December 15, 2002	2207
A nuclear submarine crashes outside the station, and the crew of Sealab (in a rare occurrence) must work quickly to stop an environmental disaster from happening. The only "serious" episode in the show, this was an original episode of "Collision of the Aquarius" (from Sealab 2020) which was redubbed by the 2021 voice actors, with approximately half of the original episode's footage excised to fit the shorter running time. The end is also modified. The episode's title derives from the sequence number of the original episode its footage comes from.
21	8	"Feast of Alvis"	December 29, 2002	2211
Capt. Murphy's attempts at a happy Alvistide go awry thanks to non-Alvian crew members, an uncooperative electrician, and Alvis himself "crapping the buffet."
22	9	"Brainswitch"	May 26, 2003	2301
An accident leaves Quinn comatose and Stormy allegedly smarter. It is possible that they have really switched brains.
23	10	"Vacation"	June 2, 2003	2212
When Dr. Quinn forcibly takes a well-deserved vacation, inside Sealab's walls, the crew attempts to find out what he is doing. (Also known as the "Uh-oh" episode; most of the episode is occupied by chain reactions of the crew and various people saying "uh-oh" set off by misunderstood dialogue.)
24	11	"Fusebox"	June 9, 2003	2213
The electricity is out in Sealab, and the crew tries to turn the power back on. This episode shows the outside of the Sealab for 8 minutes, during which time only dialogue is heard and nothing happens besides Stormy destroying a section of the Sealab, and occasional appearances by fish, sharks and bubbles. Wally Gator makes a cameo appearance.
25	12	"Article 4"	June 16, 2003	2302
A loophole in the Sealab charter turns everyone into captains, except Quinn (who is too proud to exploit the loophole), Stormy (who is too stupid), and the Chinese crew members (because of previous Asian accomplishments, including anime). Captain Murphy, meanwhile, appears to have disappeared.
26	13	"Return to Oblivion"	November 16, 2003	2303
A network executive audits the set of the hard-hitting action drama Sealab 2021, with hopes of somehow salvaging the dwindling series.

=== Season 3 (2003–04) ===
No. overall	No. in season	Title	Original release date	Prod. code
27	1	"Splitsville"	November 23, 2003	2309
Debbie and Quinn break up, while Dr. Virjay gets his old rock band back together.
28	2	"Tourist Season"	November 30, 2003	2304
Captain Murphy opens Sealab to tourists, eventually prompting Dr. Virjay to renounce his religion, and begin to eat meat from cows.
29	3	"Red Dawn"	December 7, 2003	2305
Kommissar Murphy brings Marxist–Leninist ideals to Sealab. There is a reference to Dr. Strangelove at the end of the episode.
30	4	"Meet Beck Bristow"	December 14, 2003	2306
Hollywood actor Beck Bristow (Brian Bloom) comes to Sealab to study for a television role.
31	5	"I, Robot, Really"	December 21, 2003	2307
Due to an incident with Chubby Carol, Quinn (who does not think Carol is so chubby) is blackmailed into giving each crew member a robot body, but it is unknown what is to become of the crew's old bodies. Notes: This was the last episode to have Harry Goz as Captain Murphy before his death.
32	6	"Frozen Dinner"	December 31, 2003	2308
The Sealab crew attempts a daring rescue mission to Ice Station Zebra, one of whose inhabitants has turned to cannibalism. They are accompanied by a German who "came with the sub", bears more than a passing resemblance to Jürgen Prochnow and is given to firing his pistol inside the sub and shouting "Sieg Heil, Cornelius Drebbel!". Unfortunately, the two inhabitants of Ice Station Zebra cannot be rescued due to a lack of wetsuits, thanks to Debbie packing an attractive dress for herself instead. The episode ends with a rousing rendition of the chorus of "It's a Long Way to Tipperary".
33	7	"Tornado Shanks"	January 11, 2004	2310
As Captain Murphy leaves for the Great Spice Wars, a new captain, Tornado Shanks, is given the helm.
34	8	"ASHDTV"	June 20, 2004	2311
A delivering mishap and some dishonesty on Sparks' part pockets Sealab a brand new Asteroid Smasher/high-definition television. Unfortunately, the ASHDTV was supposed to go to Spacelab so they could destroy an asteroid hurtling towards the Earth. Sparks, Marco, Debbie, Stormy and Captain Shanks watch parodies of Will and Grace, Dr. Phil, Survivor and Adult Swim, as well as Eggers appearing in a show dressed like Tom Anderson from Beavis and Butt-Head, and a crudely drawn Brak.
35	9	"Chalkboard Jungle"	June 27, 2004	2312
Dr. Quinn teaches Debbie Love's class of 4th-graders, including Fatass McBlobbicus, while having to deal with Tornado Shanks' warped and unscientific view of education. The classic story "The Scarlet Ibis", by James Hurst, is ripped off as part of a classroom discussion of death. All the while, cuts are made between Debbie Love's classroom and the spa Love is visiting, creating a series of double entendres.
36	10	"Dearly Beloved Seed"	July 4, 2004	2313
The last of Captain Shanks' brothers (who are all named for mythical Greek heroes) dies from a heart attack while on the toilet; all the while, Hesh and Debbie Dupree get married. The episode ends with Uzi fire and a parody of the dialogue style of The Matrix. The episode was written by a Sealab fan known only as "MCHeshpants420", his screen name at Adult Swim's official message boards.
37	11	"Craptastic Voyage"	July 11, 2004	2401
Quinn, White Debbie and "He Who Smokes Bitches" Stormy Waters venture deep into Tornado Shanks to destroy a malignant tumor in Captain Shanks' head. This spoofs the 1966 sci-fi movie Fantastic Voyage, although the episode has many Star Wars references.
38	12	"Let 'Em Eat Corn"	July 18, 2004	2402
Tornado Shanks declares Sealab a sovereign nation in order to be his own tax haven. A wave of secession fever sweeps through the entire crew, with a half-dozen nations declaring themselves independent in a few minutes; with the help of two British businessmen, they are all soon armed with missiles allegedly loaded with nuclear warheads. When push comes to shove and every Sealab nation declares war on every other one, however, the nukes all turn out to be duds. The Brits get away with Sealab's cash and play a horrible "rock" song over the end credits.
39	13	"Neptunati"	July 25, 2004	2403
Stormy's meddlesome inquisitiveness uncovers Shanks' membership in a world-controlling society, and endangers a large container of pus.

=== Season 4 (2004–05) ===
No. overall	No. in season	Title	Original release date	Prod. code
40	1	"Isla De Chupacabra"	November 14, 2004	2404
A team-building exercise goes horribly wrong when the Sealab crew are attacked by Chupacabras on an island named Happy Funtime Island (named by Rambo).
41	2	"Joy of Grief"	November 21, 2004	2405
After the death of Marco, a grief counselor tries to help the Sealab crew through a hard time.
42	3	"Green Fever"	November 28, 2004	2406
Zombies ravage Sealab as Debbie plans her (fifth) 30th birthday party.
43	4	"Sharko's Machine"	December 5, 2004	2407
Marco's illegitimate son applies for a job on Sealab. He must pass the civil service exam with Debbie and Quinn helping. The episode title is a reference to the Burt Reynolds movie Sharky's Machine, which took place in Atlanta, the hometown of Williams Street. This episode has the reverse of "jumping the shark" by having Sharko perform a waterski jump over a pool of Fonzies. Shanks makes repeated references to The Electric Horseman.
44	5	"Return of Marco"	December 12, 2004	2408
Marco who died three episodes ago has somehow reappeared. Later, Marco and Debbie sing Antônio Carlos Jobim's "Waters of March" in Portuguese.
45	6	"Casinko"	March 6, 2005	2501
Sealab is in danger of crashing into an ancient American Indian burial ground. A Native American named John Bear promises to save the vessel (via dance) in exchange for the construction of a casino in Sealab's mess hall.
46	7	"Butchslap"	March 13, 2005	2502
Marco's secret past from 50 years ago threatens the lives of the Sealab crew.
47	8	"Monkey Banana Raffle"	March 20, 2005	2503
An eccentric trillionaire (a parody of Richard Branson) buys Sealab.
48	9	"Shrabster"	March 27, 2005	2504
This episode presents a backwards narrative in the style of Pulp Fiction or the "backwards" episode of Seinfeld. Quinn genetically engineers a hybrid crustacean to reproduce enough larvae to end world hunger. The plot, which is revealed in a series of scenes in reverse chronological order introduced with an annoying voiceover and a bad title card, continues with Sparks selling off the rights for the shrimp-crab-lobster to Grizzlebee's; the corporation's agents, Dan and Don, try to take possession of the queen shrabster with the help of Captain Shanks, only to be thwarted by Shanks' non-cooperation. Dan and Don hijack a submersible loaded with shrabster eggs instead, only to wind up crashing it into the ocean floor and returning to dry land empty-handed. Quinn finds out about Sparks' double dealing and kills him. Shanks escapes with the queen to an unnamed city, where her loud roars attract the attention of the police; the captain gets the queen to agree to a murder-suicide pact, then neglects to kill himself, instead shooting her twice and helping himself to several bites of her claws.
49	10	"Cavemen"	April 3, 2005	2505
Quinn and Stormy are stuck in a cave with only 10 minutes of oxygen while Sealab burns. They rehash a number of things about their lives and the current week's destruction of Sealab, often through fighting, and finally ascend to heaven together, where they begin an afterlife full of encounters with longtime friends and prostitutes.
50	11	"Moby Sick"	April 10, 2005	2506
Quinn is struck with a moral dilemma when Abelard, a whale dying of asbestos-caused "whale cancer," begs Quinn to euthanize him. Environmentalists insist on saving his life, while a few people insist euthanasia is the best option. Dolphin Boy takes up the banner of Odontocetian Pride against the intrusion of the inferior Mysticetians, vowing to kill Abelard. Marco discovers that Abelard's cancer is delicious, and proceeds to eat it all out of him at the end of the episode, as a skinhead Dolphin Boy jumps onto him with a harpoon and Debbie DuPree chains herself to the swiftly sinking whale.
51	12	"No Waterworld"	April 17, 2005	2507
All the water around Sealab mysteriously disappears as a result of an alien landing. Debbie Dupree, feeling shut out by her male colleagues (hence the quote "Debbie, the men are talking.") conducts her own investigation while Sparks sells off all the oxygen tanks and shoots out all the glass windows in the station with an AK-47, resulting in yet another catastrophe when the water finally returns.
52	13	"Legacy of Laughter"	April 24, 2005	2508
The final episode of Sealab 2021, done as an interview and sort of a sequel to Tinfins (the film Tinfins 2 is in the works and it's sponsored by Grizzlebee's). There is a Q&A session with the audience, during which one person asks if the people on stage are supposed to be the voice actors as themselves, or are they in character now? The only answer is "absolutely." It's determined that the biggest problem with Sealab 2021 is that it "wasn't enough like Aqua Teen Hunger Force. You know. Good." In a loving tribute to the late Harry Goz, a greatest hits tribute to Captain Murphy is played. They promise a sneak preview of the next season right after the commercial break. Of course, there aren't any more new episodes.

=== Unaired episodes ===
No.	Title	Original release date	Prod. code
N–A	"Gert"	N/A	TBA
A very early full pilot episode (created prior to the pitch pilot) included on the Season 3 DVD set. A shark expert visits Sealab to help with a shark problem.
N–A	"Ronnie"	N/A	TBA
An unfinished full episode included on the Season 2 DVD set. The Devil tries to get Captain Murphy to remember having made a deal with him in the past, back when Murphy was a musician who did not yet work at Sealab.
N–A	"Quinnmas"	N/A	TBA
An unfinished full episode included on the Season 3 DVD set. In a parody of "A Christmas Carol," Quinn is visited by three ghosts who try to help him with his drinking problem.
N–A	"Dearly Beloved"	N/A	TBA
A full episode serving as an alternate version of Season 3's "Dearly Beloved Seed" and included on the Season 3 DVD set. This version focuses on the events, including the bachelor and bachelorette parties, leading up to the wedding featured in the episode.

== See also ==
- List of underwater science fiction works
