= Captain Murphy =

Captain Murphy may refer to the following:

- Captain Murphy, a character in an American animated television series Sealab 2020.
- Captain Murphy, a character in an American comedy animated television series Sealab 2021.
- Captain Murphy, a rhyming alter ego of Flying Lotus named after the Sealab 2021 character.
