= 1973–74 United States network television schedule (daytime) =

The following is the 1973–74 daytime network television schedule for the three major English-language commercial broadcast networks in the United States. It covers the weekday and weekend daytime hours from September 1973 to August 1974. All times are Eastern and Pacific. By 1974, the networks in the Pacific Time Zone would shift to a Central Time Zone schedule altogether.

Talk shows are highlighted in yellow, local programming is white, reruns of older programming are orange, game shows are pink, soap operas are chartreuse, news programs are gold, children's programs are light purple and sports programs are light blue. New series are highlighted in bold.

PBS, the Public Broadcasting Service, was in operation, but the schedule was set by each local station.

As of April 1974, four of the top 10 daytime television programs were game shows, according to Nielsen. The most-watched program was Hollywood Squares.

== Monday-Friday ==
Network		6:00 am	6:30 am	7:00 am	7:30 am	8:00 am	8:30 am	9:00 am	9:30 am	10:00 am	10:30 am	11:00 am	11:30 am	noon	12:30 pm	1:00 pm	1:30 pm	2:00 pm	2:30 pm	3:00 pm	3:30 pm	4:00 pm	4:30 pm	5:00 pm	5:30 pm	6:00 pm	6:30 pm
ABC	Fall	Local/syndicated programming											The Brady Bunch reruns	Password	Split Second	All My Children	Let's Make a Deal	The Newlywed Game	The Girl in My Life	General Hospital	One Life to Live	Love, American Style reruns	Local/syndicated programming				ABC News
ABC	Spring	Local/syndicated programming											The Brady Bunch reruns	Password	Split Second	All My Children	Let's Make a Deal	The Newlywed Game	The Girl in My Life	General Hospital	One Life to Live	**The $10,000 Pyramid**	Local/syndicated programming				ABC News
CBS	Fall	Sunrise Semester	Local/syndicated programming	CBS Morning News		Captain Kangaroo		Local/syndicated programming		The Joker's Wild	The $10,000 Pyramid	Gambit	Love of Life; 11:55 am: CBS Midday News	The Young and the Restless	Search for Tomorrow	Local/syndicated programming	As the World Turns	The Guiding Light	The Edge of Night	The Price Is Right	Match Game '73	The Secret Storm	Local/syndicated programming				CBS Evening News
CBS	Winter	Sunrise Semester	Local/syndicated programming	CBS Morning News		Captain Kangaroo		Local/syndicated programming		The Joker's Wild	The $10,000 Pyramid	Gambit	Love of Life; 11:55 am: CBS Midday News	The Young and the Restless	Search for Tomorrow	Local/syndicated programming	As the World Turns	The Guiding Light	The Edge of Night	The Price Is Right	Match Game '74	**Tattletales**	Local/syndicated programming				CBS Evening News
CBS	Spring	Sunrise Semester	Local/syndicated programming	CBS Morning News		Captain Kangaroo		Local/syndicated programming		The Joker's Wild	Gambit	**Now You See It**	Love of Life; 11:55 am: CBS Midday News	The Young and the Restless	Search for Tomorrow	Local/syndicated programming	As the World Turns	The Guiding Light	The Edge of Night	The Price Is Right	Match Game '74	**Tattletales**	Local/syndicated programming				CBS Evening News
NBC	Fall	Local/syndicated programming		Today				Local/syndicated programming		Dinah's Place	Baffle	The Wizard of Odds	The Hollywood Squares	Jeopardy!	The Who, What, or Where Game; 12:55 pm: NBC News Update	Local/syndicated programming	Three on a Match	Days of Our Lives	The Doctors	Another World	Return to Peyton Place	Somerset	Local/syndicated programming				NBC Nightly News
NBC	Winter	Local/syndicated programming		Today				Local/syndicated programming		Dinah's Place	Jeopardy!	The Wizard of Odds	The Hollywood Squares	**Jackpot**	All-Star Baffle; 12:55 pm: NBC News Update	Local/syndicated programming	Three on a Match	Days of Our Lives	The Doctors	Another World	**How to Survive a Marriage**	Somerset	Local/syndicated programming				NBC Nightly News
NBC	Spring	Local/syndicated programming		Today				Local/syndicated programming		Dinah's Place	Jeopardy!	The Wizard of Odds	The Hollywood Squares	**Jackpot**	**Celebrity Sweepstakes**; 12:55 pm: NBC News Update	Local/syndicated programming	Three on a Match	Days of Our Lives	The Doctors	Another World	**How to Survive a Marriage**	Somerset	Local/syndicated programming				NBC Nightly News
NBC	Summer	Local/syndicated programming		Today				Local/syndicated programming		**Name That Tune**	**Winning Streak**	**High Rollers**	The Hollywood Squares	**Jackpot**	**Celebrity Sweepstakes**; 12:55 pm: NBC News Update	Local/syndicated programming	Jeopardy!	Days of Our Lives	The Doctors	Another World	**How to Survive a Marriage**	Somerset	Local/syndicated programming				NBC Nightly News

=== Note ===
- ABC had a 6 p.m. (ET)/5 p.m (CT) feed for their newscast, depending on stations' schedules.

== Saturday ==
Network		7:00 am	7:30 am	8:00 am	8:30 am	9:00 am	9:30 am	10:00 am	10:30 am	11:00 am	11:30 am	noon	12:30 pm	1:00 pm	1:30 pm	2:00 pm	2:30 pm	3:00 pm	3:30 pm	4:00 pm	4:30 pm	5:00 pm	5:30 pm	6:00 pm	6:30 pm
ABC		Local/syndicated programming		The Bugs Bunny Show	**Yogi's Gang**	**Super Friends**		**Lassie's Rescue Rangers**	**Goober and the Ghost Chasers**	The Brady Kids	**Mission: Magic!**	The New Saturday Superstar Movie		American Bandstand		ABC Sports and/or local/syndicated programming									
CBS	Fall	Local/syndicated programming		The Flintstone Comedy Show	**Bailey's Comets**	The New Scooby-Doo Movies		**My Favorite Martians**	**Jeannie**	**Speed Buggy**	Josie and the Pussycats (R)	Everything's Archie (R)	Fat Albert and the Cosby Kids	CBS Children's Film Festival		CBS Sports and/or local/syndicated programming								CBS Evening News	Local/syndicated programming
CBS	Spring	Local/syndicated programming		Help!... It's the Hair Bear Bunch! (R)	Sabrina the Teenage Witch (R)	The New Scooby-Doo Movies		**My Favorite Martians**	**Jeannie**	**Speed Buggy**	Josie and the Pussycats (R)	The Pebbles and Bamm-Bamm Show (R)	Fat Albert and the Cosby Kids	CBS Children's Film Festival		CBS Sports and/or local/syndicated programming								CBS Evening News	Local/syndicated programming
NBC	Fall	Local/syndicated programming		Lidsville (R)	**Inch High, Private Eye**	**The Addams Family**	**Emergency +4**	**Butch Cassidy and the Sundance Kids**	**Star Trek: The Animated Series**	**Sigmund and the Sea Monsters**	The New Pink Panther Show	The Jetsons (R)	**Go!**	NBC Sports and/or local/syndicated programming										Local/syndicated programming	NBC Saturday Night News
NBC	Spring	Local/syndicated programming		Lidsville (R)	The Addams Family	Emergency +4	Inch High, Private Eye	**Butch Cassidy and the Sundance Kids**	**Star Trek: The Animated Series**	**Sigmund and the Sea Monsters**	The New Pink Panther Show	The Jetsons (R)	**Go!**	NBC Sports and/or local/syndicated programming										Local/syndicated programming	NBC Saturday Night News

== Sunday ==
Network		7:00 am	7:30 am	8:00 am	8:30 am	9:00 am	9:30 am	10:00 am	10:30 am	11:00 am	11:30 am	noon	12:30 pm	1:00 pm	1:30 pm	2:00 pm	2:30 pm	3:00 pm	3:30 pm	4:00 pm	4:30 pm	5:00 pm	5:30 pm	6:00 pm	6:30 pm
ABC		Local/syndicated programming						Kid Power (R)	The Osmonds (R)	H.R. Pufnstuff (R)	Make A Wish	Issues and Answers		ABC Sports and/or local/syndicated programming											
CBS	Fall	Local/syndicated programming		The Amazing Chan and the Chan Clan (R)	Help!... It's the Hair Bear Bunch! (R)	Local/syndicated programming		Lamp Unto My Feet	Look Up and Live	Camera Three	Face The Nation	Local/syndicated programming	The NFL Today	NFL on CBS and/or local/syndicated programming										Local/syndicated programming	CBS Evening News
CBS	Winter	Local/syndicated programming		The Amazing Chan and the Chan Clan (R)	Help!... It's the Hair Bear Bunch! (R)	Local/syndicated programming		Lamp Unto My Feet	Look Up and Live	Camera Three	Face The Nation	CBS Sports and/or local/syndicated programming												60 Minutes	
CBS	Spring	Local/syndicated programming		The Amazing Chan and the Chan Clan (R)	Bailey's Comets	Local/syndicated programming		Lamp Unto My Feet	Look Up and Live	Camera Three	Face The Nation	CBS Sports and/or local/syndicated programming												60 Minutes	
CBS	Summer	Local/syndicated programming		The Amazing Chan and the Chan Clan (R)	Bailey's Comets	Local/syndicated programming		Lamp Unto My Feet	Look Up and Live	Camera Three	Face The Nation	CBS Sports and/or local/syndicated programming												Local/syndicated programming	CBS Evening News
NBC	Fall	Local/syndicated programming										Meet The Press	**Grandstand**	NFL on NBC and/or local/syndicated programming										Local/syndicated programming	NBC Sunday Night News
NBC	Winter	Local/syndicated programming											Meet The Press	NBC Sports and/or local/syndicated programming										Local/syndicated programming	NBC Sunday Night News

== By network ==
=== ABC ===
**Returning series**

- ABC Evening News
- The ABC Saturday Superstar Movie
- All My Children
- American Bandstand
- The Brady Bunch (reruns)
- The Brady Kids
- The Bugs Bunny Show
- General Hospital
- The Girl in My Life
- H.R. Pufnstuf (reruns)
- Issues and Answers
- Kid Power (reruns)
- Let's Make a Deal
- Love, American Style (reruns)
- Make a Wish
- Multiplication Rock / Grammar Rock
- The Newlywed Game
- One Life to Live
- The Osmonds (reruns)
- Password
- Split Second

**New series**

- **The $10,000 Pyramid**
- **Goober and the Ghost Chasers**
- **Lassie's Rescue Rangers**
- **Mission: Magic!**
- **Super Friends**
- **Yogi's Gang**

**Not returning from 1972-73**

- Bewitched (reruns)
- The Bullwinkle Show (reruns; returned in 1981 on NBC)
- Curiosity Shop (reruns)
- The Dating Game
- The Funky Phantom (reruns)
- The Jackson 5ive
- Lidsville (reruns; moved to NBC)
- The Monkees (reruns)

=== CBS ===
**Returning series**

- The $10,000 Pyramid
- The Amazing Chan and the Chan Clan (reruns)
- As the World Turns
- Camera Three
- Captain Kangaroo
- CBS Children's Film Festival
- CBS Evening News
- CBS Morning News
- The Edge of Night
- Everything's Archie
- Face the Nation
- Fat Albert and the Cosby Kids
- The Flintstones Comedy Show (reruns)
- Gambit
- The Guiding Light
- Help!... It's the Hair Bear Bunch! (reruns)
- The Joker's Wild
- Josie and the Pussycats (reruns)
- Lamp Unto My Feet
- Look Up and Live
- Love of Life
- Match Game
- The New Scooby-Doo Movies
- The Pebbles and Bamm-Bamm Show (reruns)
- The Price Is Right
- Sabrina the Teenage Witch (reruns)
- Search for Tomorrow
- The Secret Storm
- Sunrise Semester
- The Young and the Restless

**New series**

- **Bailey's Comets**
- **Jeannie**
- **My Favorite Martians**
- **Now You See It**
- **Speed Buggy**
- **Tattletales**

**Not returning from 1972-73**

- Archie's Funhouse (reruns)
- Archie's TV Funnies
- Family Affair (reruns)
- Harlem Globetrotters (reruns)
- Hollywood's Talking
- Josie and the Pussycats in Outer Space
- Love is a Many Splendored Thing
- The Vin Scully Show
- Where the Heart Is

=== NBC ===
**Returning series**

- Another World
- Baffle
- Days of Our Lives
- Dinah's Place
- The Doctors
- The Hollywood Squares
- Jeopardy!
- The Jetsons (reruns)
- Lidsville (reruns) (moved from ABC)
- Meet the Press
- Name That Tune
- NBC Nightly News
- NBC Saturday Night News
- NBC Sunday Night News
- The New Pink Panther Show
- Return to Peyton Place
- Somerset
- Three on a Match
- Today
- The Who, What, or Where Game
- The Wizard of Odds

**New series**

- **The Addams Family**
- **Butch Cassidy and the Sundance Kids**
- **Celebrity Sweepstakes**
- **Emergency +4**
- **Go!**
- **High Rollers**
- **How to Survive a Marriage**
- **Inch High, Private Eye**
- **Jackpot**
- **Sigmund and the Sea Monsters**
- **Star Trek: The Animated Series**
- **Winning Streak**

**Not returning from 1972-73**

- Around the World in 80 Days
- The Barkleys
- Concentration (continued in syndication)
- The Houndcats
- The Roman Holidays
- Runaround
- Sale of the Century (returned in 1982-83)
- Sealab 2020

== See also ==
- 1973-74 United States network television schedule (prime-time)
- 1973-74 United States network television schedule (late night)
