= Boosh =

Boosh may refer to:

- The Mighty Boosh, a British comedy troupe.
- "Boosh!", a catchphrase used by many characters on the American animated TV program Frisky Dingo.
