= Christian Danley =

American artist, animator, actor, and playwright

Christian Danley is an American artist, animator, actor, playwright, film producer, and film editor.

He has been an artist, animator, and occasional voice actor for Sealab 2021 and Frisky Dingo. Danley has performed regularly with the Dad's Garage Theatre Company in Atlanta since the late 1990s. In 2008, Danley co-wrote, starred in, and directed the play FWD>> with Randall P. Havens. In 2010, Havens and Danley co-wrote and starred in the play Griefers.
