= Dicktown (TV series) =

Animated sitcom

- Created by: John Hodgman; David Rees
- Written by: John Hodgman; David Rees
- Directed by: Todd Redner (season 1); Matt Thompson (season 1)
- Voices of: John Hodgman; David Rees
- Opening theme: "Dicktown" by "Weird Al" Yankovic (season 2)
- Composer: JG Thirlwell
- Country of origin: United States
- Original language: English
- No. of seasons: 2
- No. of episodes: 20

Production
- Executive producers: Matt Thompson; Eric Sims
- Running time: 11 minutes
- Production companies: Floyd County Productions; FXP

Original release
- Network: FXX
- Release: July 9, 2020 – March 31, 2022

Related
- Cake

Dicktown is an American adult animated sitcom created and written by John Hodgman and David Rees for FXX. Hodgman and Rees also star, and serve as executive producers alongside Matt Thompson. The show's concept has been described as a mix of "a little Encyclopedia Brown, a little Scooby-Doo, and a lot of heart."

The first season premiered on July 9, 2020, as a weekly segment on the third season of Cake. The second season began airing as a standalone series on March 3, 2022.

== Premise ==
The series is set in the fictional North Carolina town of Richardsville (nicknamed "Dicktown"), where John Hunchman (voiced by Hodgman) solves mysteries for local teenagers, assisted by his former bully David Purefoy (Rees).

Richardsville is based on Rees' hometown of Chapel Hill. The Lunch Hut diner in the show is based on Sutton's Drug Store, a character is named for Culbreth Middle School, and another is named for Purefoy Road where Rees attended pre-school.

== Cast ==
=== Main ===
- John Hodgman as John Hunchman
- David Rees as David Purefoy

=== Recurring ===
- Ronald Peet as Tucker
- Stephen Tobolowsky as John’s Dad
- Jon Glaser as Mark Tagliano
- Obehi Janice as Heather Culbreath
- Amy Sedaris as Giovanna
- Heather Lawless as Jen the Waitress
- Anna Akana as Meg
- Griffin Newman as Lance
- Kristen Schaal as Kendra
- Paul F. Tompkins as Loafer Toeknuckle
- Janie Haddad Tompkins as Emma Bowers
- Jean Grae as Monica

=== Guest ===
- Zach Galifianakis as Charlie
- Amber Nash as Marinello
- Janet Varney as Tracey
- Lovie Simone
- Lauren Ashley Smith as Croquet Player
- Sarah Vowell
- Mike Mitchell
- Jo Firestone
- Aimee Mann

== Production ==
Animation for the series is provided by Floyd County Productions.

== Release ==
Dicktown premiered on July 9, 2020, as part of FXX's anthology series Cake, with ten segments airing throughout its third season; these segments were also released as standalone episodes for streaming on Hulu, categorized as season 1.

The second season of Dicktown – its first as a standalone series on linear television – premiered on March 3, 2022, on FXX in the United States and Canada, with two segments airing in a 30-minute block each week for five weeks.

== Episodes ==
=== Series overview ===
Season	Episodes	Originally released	
Season	Episodes	First released	Last released
1	10	July 9, 2020	September 3, 2020
2	10	March 3, 2022	March 31, 2022

=== Season 1 (2020) ===
The first season aired as a segment on Cake.

No. overall	No. in season	Title	Original release date	Prod. code	US viewers (millions)
1	1	"The Mystery of the Controversial Cosplay"	July 9, 2020	101	0.067
Hunchman and Purefoy are hired to find out who is the alt-right anti-SJW trolling the woman who cosplays as Aquaman and other DC characters.
2	2	"The Mystery of the Maybe Boyfriend"	July 9, 2020	102	0.036
Meg, a young VHS retro store clerk, hires Hunchman and Purefoy to figure out if she and her boyfriend are a couple or just friends with benefits, and takes them to a night club to meet him.
3	3	"The Mystery of the Party Pines"	July 16, 2020	103	0.065
Hunchman and Purefoy are hired to catch the masked lurker who likes to spy on students partying in the woods.
4	4	"The Mystery of the Creepy Piano Teacher"	July 23, 2020	104	0.082
A young woman hires Hunchman and Purefoy to find out why her piano teacher is making her smash the piano instead of teaching her how to play.
5	5	"The Mystery of the Mumbling Rapper"	July 30, 2020	105	0.060
John and David are hired by a teen mumble rap sensation, Lil Blurp, to find ten escaped ocelots in an abandoned shopping mall where he is shooting his next music video with John's endearing out of the loop dad as his manager.
6	6	"The Mystery of the Croquet Meltdown"	August 6, 2020	106	0.068
Strapped for cash, John and David ask their rich former client Tucker for a loan, but end up taking part in his brand-awareness-raising croquet tournament instead, hoping to win the cash prize. However, John takes the game too seriously.
7	7	"The Mystery of the Missing Detective"	August 13, 2020	107	0.081
John becomes paranoid that the lake patrol is coming to confiscate his shabby old houseboat on which he and David live so he hides it in the swamp and shares his regret-filled backstory with David.
8	8	"The Mystery of the Moaning Ghost"	August 20, 2020	108	0.080
John and David are hired by a violent teenage delinquent, who wants to sue the mysterious ghost that has been haunting the house where he and his single mother he clings to live.
9	9	"The Mystery of the Impossible Car"	August 27, 2020	109	0.082
John and David are on a sting operation in their favorite diner watching a patron suspected of stealing a rare vintage car from their naive client, when Heather, John's old bestie with whom he's always been secretly in love, walks in.
10	10	"The Mystery of the President's Physician"	September 3, 2020	110	0.061
While dining with his dad at The President's Physician, a fancy restaurant where his and David's heavily pregnant waitress friend Jen now works, John hears the spoiled rich yuppie owner and his girlfriend arguing over her missing ring.

=== Season 2 (2022) ===
No. overall	No. in season	Title	Directed by	Original release date	Prod. code	US viewers (millions)
11	1	"The Mystery of the Missing Pimento Cheese Recipe"	John Hodgman & David Rees	March 3, 2022	201	0.110
John and David hit the semi-big-time when a local TV news show decides to profile them. The clock is ticking as they try to locate a legendary stolen recipe for pimento cheese.
12	2	"The Mystery of the Mammal Island"	Todd Redner	March 3, 2022	202	0.110
John and David go undercover as adorable lil' animals in the addictive video game/cutesy capitalist dystopia called Mammal Island. Their job: retrieve a stolen golden parsnip! Their other job: to survive!
13	3	"The Mystery of the Strawberry Patch"	Matt Thompson	March 10, 2022	203	0.220
Nights at the strawberry patch have never been hotter until Farmer Rigsbee hires John and David to shut the hanky panky down. They are going to have to get down, dirty, and high to solve this one. Meanwhile, John's mystery stalker reveals themselves.
14	4	"The Mystery of the Adventures of Pon-Pon"	Eric Sims	March 10, 2022	204	0.220
John and David's business strategy is thrown into chaos when Pon-Pon, the Belgian Boy Detective, comes to town. A murder mystery at Sparecrust Manor offers them one last chance to impress Richardsville's most influential grownups.
15	5	"The Mystery of the Marauding Mascot"	John Hodgman	March 17, 2022	205	0.123
Cancel culture comes to Richardsville High School when its mascot, the Smoking Baby, is retired. The new mascot is an agent of chaos named Grubby. But when Grubby goes too far, can John and David clear his name?
16	6	"The Mystery of Meg's Extremely Violent and Inappropriate Musical"	David Rees	March 17, 2022	206	0.123
Meg's new high school musical I SING ON YOUR GRAVE is extremely violent and tasteless, but even she agrees it is not OK when her male lead is almost castrated onstage. John and David join the cast and sing their way to a solution.
17	7	"The Mystery of the Golden Lungs"	Matt Thompson	March 24, 2022	207	0.134
John convinces David to help him trap his stalker, Scooby-Doo style.
18	8	"The Mystery of Dr. Marjorie Frost"	Eric Sims	March 24, 2022	208	0.134
David strikes out on his own, working late at a fried pork anus factory and learning a lesson.
19	9	"The Mystery of Lance's Lesson"	Todd Redner	March 31, 2022	209	0.165
On the outs with David, John finds a new partner: everyone's favorite juvenile delinquent Lance. Lance may be banned from every business in town, but he is also the only person who can knock some sense into John.
20	10	"The Mystery of the Decades-Old Mystery"	John Hodgman & David Rees	March 31, 2022	210	0.165
In the dramatic series finale, John and David reunite to finally solve the biggest mystery of their childhood. With the help of some cutting-edge mindscape technology (and drugs), they embark on the journey of self-discovery to their most mysterious, dangerous location yet — John's mind.

== Reception ==
=== Critical reception ===
Joel Keller of Decider wrote, "Dicktown is not only funny, it tells a pretty good story of two guys who should have grown up a long time ago but for one reason or another they just haven’t. But, bless them, they keep trying." Steve Greene of IndieWire asserted, "Amid the bevy of recurring animated series that make up some of the most memorable Cake filling, Dicktown may well be the richest. John Hodgman and David Rees’ sharp spin on a boy detective all grown up and living in his North Carolina hometown is effortlessly entertaining."
