= Unsupervised =

2012 American TV series

- The main characters. Joel Zymanski (left) and Gary Garrison
- Genre: Comedy
- Created by: David Hornsby; Rob Rosell; Scott Marder
- Voices of: Justin Long; David Hornsby; Kristen Bell; Romany Malco
- Theme music composer: DJsNeverEndingStory (credited as D. Scorch'd); Steven "Minks" Burton
- Country of origin: United States
- Original language: English
- No. of seasons: 1
- No. of episodes: 13

Production
- Executive producers: David Hornsby; Scott Marder; Rob Rosell; Adam Reed; Matt Thompson; Rob McElhenney; Glenn Howerton; Charlie Day
- Running time: 19–21 minutes
- Production companies: Floyd County Productions; RCG Productions; The Professional Writing Company; FX Productions

Original release
- Network: FX
- Release: January 19 – December 20, 2012

Unsupervised is an American adult animated sitcom created by David Hornsby, Rob Rosell, and Scott Marder which ran on FX from January 19 to December 20, 2012.

On November 17, 2012, the series was canceled after one season.

== Plot ==
The series follows two 15-year-old best friends, Gary and Joel, as they try to navigate through teenage life while also trying to do the right thing without the help of any parental supervision.

== Cast and characters ==
- Gary Garrison (voiced by Justin Long): Gary's father has abandoned him and he lives with his pot-smoking stepmother, who is often absent and takes no responsibility for him when she is physically present. Gary is very idealistic and he and his friend Joel always support each other.
- Joel Zymanski (voiced by David Hornsby): Generally more excitable than Gary, and a little less mature, Joel lacks subtlety. An optimistic humanitarian like Gary, Joel loves to dance and is particularly proud of his ability to spin on the spot.
- Megan McKinley (voiced by Kristen Bell): A mature but selfish and self-centered student who wants to be popular and "cool." She complains about her well-meaning but permissive mother.
- Darius Jenkins (voiced by Romany Malco): An excellent student who is defensive about his weight. Darius is a realist (except where his weight is concerned). He has a strict mother.
- Russ Brown (voiced by Rob Rosell): An impulsive classmate of Gary and Joel's. He perpetually has one arm in a cast and sniffs the cast when he's uneasy. Comes from a broken, utterly impoverished home and has multiple siblings.

=== Recurring ===
- Carol (voiced by Kaitlin Olson), Gary's irresponsible stepmother who barely notices he exists and gives him no support or stability.
- Danielle (voiced by Kaitlin Olson), also called "Rocket Tits", a disinterested student at Maynord High, considered a lust-interest of Joel Zymanski and sometime best friend of Megan McKinley.
- Martin Rivera (voiced by Fred Armisen), Gary's middle-aged Latino next-door neighbor, a widower who works insane hours at a soul-crushing job and is always heavily sweating.
- Christina Rivera (voiced by Alexa Vega), Martin's rude, rebellious teenage daughter.
- Rachel (voiced by Maria Bamford), Christina's friend.
- Jojo Venetti (voiced by Scott Marder), the toughest kid in school; a bully who gets wasted with any/every substance available.
- Mrs. McKinley (voiced by Maria Bamford), Megan's liberal mother, who enthusiastically encourages her non-rebellious daughter to engage in all manner of irresponsible teenage behavior, including partying and dating.
- Sid (voiced by André Sogliuzzo), Gary's tough Australian neighbor, a retired ecological /corporate lawyer and kangaroo researcher (the show implies his relationship with kangaroos involves bestiality).
- Dirt (voiced by Glenn Howerton), Jojo's friend, a slightly-old "bad" boy.
- Principal Margaret Stark (voiced by Sally Kellerman), the cynical and corrupt principal of Maynord High, Gary and Joel's school. Nicknamed "The Skunk" because of the white stripe in her hair.
- Coach Durham (voiced by Clifton Powell), the baseball coach (and teacher) who lives in his car just outside the school field.

== Production ==
Unsupervised was created by David Hornsby, Scott Marder, and Rob Rosell, who also serve as executive producers alongside Adam Reed, Matt Thompson, Rob McElhenney, Glenn Howerton, and Charlie Day. The series was produced by Floyd County Productions (who also handled animation services), RCG Productions, and FX Productions.

Unsupervised appeared on the FX Network development slate in March 2011 under the title Townies, and was eyed as a companion to the current FX animated comedy Archer. On September 15, 2011, the series was given a series order of 13 episodes under the new title Unsupervised. Hornsby, Rosell, and Marder were the executive producers, with Rosell and Marder acting as show-runners. Musician DJsNeverEndingStory was hired as the composer for the animation's hip-hop-influenced music.

On October 17, 2011, FX released a preview trailer of Unsupervised titled "Fresh Men". The series premiered on January 19, 2012, at 10:30pm following Archer. FX officially announced the season finale to be aired on March 22, 2012, bringing the first season to 10 episodes.

Later, the 3 remaining episodes, which were scheduled to be aired between "Jesse Judge Lawncare Incorporated" and "Youngbloods", were written during the first production cycle. However, due to a production issue with Archer, they were postponed in conjunction with FX wanting to end the two shows in sync. These episodes ultimately aired from December 6–20, 2012. In November 2012, Hornsby and Howerton confirmed on Twitter that the show would not be renewed for a second season. Reruns of the series briefly aired on Cartoon Network's Adult Swim programming block in 2015.

== Episodes ==
No.	Title	Written by	Original release date	Prod. code	US viewers (millions)
1	"Pilot"	David Hornsby, Scott Marder & Rob Rosell	January 19, 2012	XUN01001	0.86
Joel and Gary raise money to throw a party that quickly gets out of hand.
2	"Rich Girl"	David Hornsby, Scott Marder & Rob Rosell	January 26, 2012	XUN01003	0.59
When Gary and Joel realize that they're poor, they try to set up Gary's stepmother with the rich father of a new student at their high school.
3	"Field of Dreams.... and Dogs"	David Hornsby, Scott Marder & Rob Rosell	February 2, 2012	XUN01002	0.62
Attempting to surround themselves with good influences, Gary and Joel decide to manage the high-school baseball team.
4	"Fires & Liars"	David Hornsby, Scott Marder & Rob Rosell	February 9, 2012	XUN01005	0.55
Gary and Joel light a fire and blame it on the homeless people in order to help out two firefighters who used to be popular following the 9/11 attacks.
5	"Stupid Idiots"	David Hornsby, Scott Marder & Rob Rosell	February 16, 2012	XUN01006	0.77
When Gary and Joel discover that the school segregates people based on how quickly they learn, they protest the injustice by demanding to take the latest standardized test.
6	"Nits"	David Hornsby, Scott Marder & Rob Rosell	February 23, 2012	XUN01004	0.60
A lice outbreak threatens Gary and Joel's plan to hook up with girls at the school dance.
7	"The Magic of Science"	John Carcieri & David Hornsby	March 1, 2012	XUN01007	0.50
Gary and Joel enlist a psychic to help them win the science fair.
8	"My Brother Brian"	Rob Rosell, Scott Marder & David Hornsby	March 8, 2012	XUN01008	0.53
Joel's 40-year-old brother Brian moves back into Joel's bedroom and Joel strives to be more tolerant of him despite his contemptible behavior.
9	"Jesse Judge Lawncare Incorporated"	John Carcieri & Rob Rosell	March 15, 2012	XUN01009	0.59
Gary and Joel try to acquire sweet tans and mad paper by hooking up with a young lawn-care entrepreneur who has a serious problem.
10	"Youngbloods"	Rob Rosell, Scott Marder & David Hornsby	March 22, 2012	XUN01010	0.51
Gary and Joel get fake IDs so that they can give blood.
11	"The Great Traveler's Road"	Rob Rosell, Scott Marder & David Hornsby	December 6, 2012	TBA	N/A
Gary and Joel learn the meaning of school pride when a turf war with prep-school kids erupts over their prized food mart.
12	"Black Squirrels"	Rob Rosell, Scott Marder & David Hornsby	December 13, 2012	TBA	0.27
When Joel's brother Brian gets out of prison, the boys get him a job as head of security at their school.
13	"Reggie Dog Bites"	Becky Mann & Audra Sielaff	December 20, 2012	TBA	0.69
The boys save Carol's ex, Reggie, from being buried in an unmarked grave--but have to dispose of his body themselves.

== Reception ==
Unsupervised received many mixed to negative reviews from critics upon its premiere with its pilot, holding a 3.5 or "Awful" rating on IGN. Alan Sepinwall gave the show a mixed review, noting that he liked the way Gary and Joel (and their classmates, generally) were presented as decent kids, instead of default stereotypes of poor troublemakers, but that the show was not also that funny. Although critics were disappointed with the premiere, later episodes of the season were given much higher marks, with The A.V. Club giving the season one finale an A−. Currently, Unsupervised holds a 46 out of 100 score, based on 16 reviews, from Metacritic.
