= Matt Thompson (animator) =

American animator

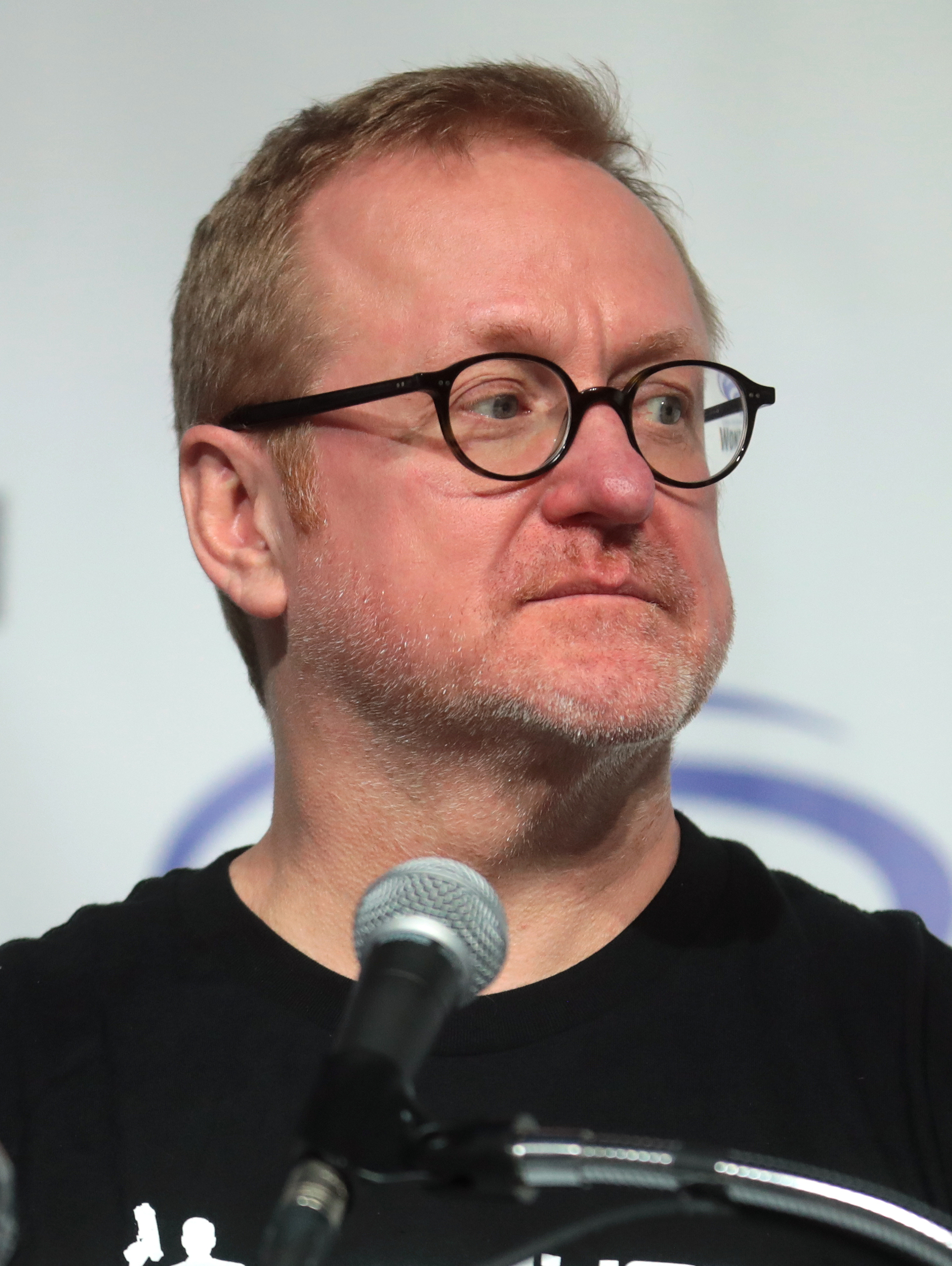
- Thompson at the 2019 WonderCon
- Occupations: Producer; writer; director; animator; voice actor
- Years active: 1994–present
- Notable work: Sealab 2021, Frisky Dingo, Archer, Dicktown, Hit-Monkey
- Website: https://floydcountyproductions.tv

Matt Patrick Thompson is an American television producer, television writer, television director, animator, and voice actor.

== Career ==
=== Early work ===
Matt Thompson, and his creative partner Adam Reed, started at Cartoon Network doing various odd jobs until they came up with their own show, High Noon Toons, in the mid-1990s. High Noon Toons was a 3-hour programming block of cartoons hosted by cowboy hand puppets Haas and Lil' Jo (a Bonanza pun).

He has also voiced the "Talent Scout" character on the series 12 oz. Mouse.

=== Production companies ===
Thompson and Reed formed 70/30 Productions when they started work on Sealab 2021. The company's name came from the plan that Thompson would do 70% of the producing and 30% of the writing, with Reed doing the reverse.

The pair became renowned for their work on several Adult Swim television projects, chiefly Sealab 2021 and their follow-up Frisky Dingo, which aired for two seasons.

In 2009, Reed and Thompson closed 70/30 Productions and formed Floyd County Productions to produce Reed's new project, the FX Network series Archer.

Archer has received positive reviews from critics and has won many awards, including three Primetime Emmy Awards and four Critics Choice Awards. The series has also received 15 Annie Award nominations, among others, for outstanding achievement in animation, writing, direction, and voice acting. At San Diego Comic-Con 2018, it was announced the tenth season would be titled Archer: 1999. Reed intended to leave Archer after its tenth season, although plans for the show were not finalized.

Since they founded Floyd County Productions, the pair have grown the company from a small eight-person studio into a competitive animation house. The company not only develops exclusive programming but also produces content for other media, including the TV shows Atlanta, Legion, Fargo, Goliath, and It's Always Sunny in Philadelphia.

== Filmography ==
=== Television ===
Year	Title	Director	Writer	Producer	Creator	Notes
1994–95	High Noon Toons	No	Yes	Yes	No	Also wrote various interstitial material featuring Haas and Lil Jo
2000–05	Sealab 2021	Yes	Yes	Executive	No	Directed 53 episodes, wrote 13 episodes
2006–08	Frisky Dingo	Yes	Yes	Executive	Yes	Directed 25 episodes, wrote 20 episodes
2008	The Xtacles	Yes	Yes	Yes	Yes	Directed 2 episodes, wrote 2 episodes
2009–23	Archer	Yes	Yes	Executive	No	Directed 91 episodes, wrote 2 episodes
2012	Unsupervised	No	No	Yes	No	
2014	Chozen	No	No	Executive	No	
2019–2021	Missed Connections	Yes	No	Executive	No	
2020–2021	Shark Lords	Yes	No	Executive	Yes	
2020–2021	Greetings From Florida	No	No	Executive	No	
2020–2021	The Places Where We Live	No	No	Executive	No	
2020–2021	Walt	No	No	Executive	No	
2020–2021	Poorly Drawn Lines	Yes	No	Executive	No	
2020–2022	Dicktown	Yes	No	Executive	No	20 episodes
2021–2024	Hit-Monkey	No	No	Executive	No	20 episodes

==== Voice acting ====
Year	Title	Role	Notes
1994–95	High Noon Toons	Haas	
2000–05	Sealab 2021	Sharko/Evans/Ad Pitcher 2	13 episodes
2005–07	12 oz. Mouse	Talent Scout	3 episodes
2006–08	Frisky Dingo	Actor	15 episodes
2008	The Xtacles	Reporter	One Episode
2009–2023	Archer	Various	
2020–2021	Poorly Drawn Lines	Various	10 episodes
2020–2022	Dicktown	Various	20 episodes
2021	America: The Motion Picture	Various	

=== Film ===
Year	Title	Role
2021	America: The Motion Picture	Director and producer

== Accolades ==
Year	Award	Category	Nominee	Result
2010	NewNowNext Awards	Best Show You're Not Watching	Archer	Won
2011	Annie Awards	Best General Audience Animated TV/Broadcast Production	Archer	Nominated
2011	Critics' Choice Television Awards	Best Comedy Series	Archer	Nominated
2012	Annie Awards	Best General Audience Animated TV/Broadcast Production	Archer	Nominated
2012	Comedy Awards	Best Animated Comedy Series	Archer	Won
2012	Critics' Choice Television Awards	Best Animated Series	Archer	Won
2013	Annie Awards	Best General Audience Animated TV/Broadcast Production	Archer	Nominated
2013	Critics' Choice Television Awards	Best Animated Series	Archer	Won
2014	Annie Awards	Best General Audience Animated TV/Broadcast Production	Archer	Nominated
2014	Critics' Choice Television Awards	Best Animated Series	Archer	Won
2014	Primetime Emmy Award	Outstanding Animated Program	For "Archer Vice: The Rules Of Extraction"	Nominated
2015	Annie Awards	Best General Audience Animated TV/Broadcast Production	Archer	Nominated
2015	Critics' Choice Television Awards	Best Animated Series	Archer	Won
2015	Primetime Emmy Award	Outstanding Animated Program	"Pocket Listing"	Nominated
2015	Primetime Emmy Award	Outstanding Creative Achievement in Interactive Media – Multiplatform Storytelling	Mark Paterson & Tim Farrell for "Archer Scavenger Hunt"	Won
2016	Primetime Emmy Award	Outstanding Animated Program	"The Figgis Agency"	Won
2016	Primetime Emmy Award	Outstanding Creative Achievement in Interactive Media – Multiplatform Storytelling	Mark Paterson, Tim Farrell, & Bryan Fordney for "Archer Scavenger Hunt 2"	Won
2017	Primetime Emmy Award	Outstanding Animated Program	"Archer Dreamland: No Good Deed"	Nominated
2018	Critics' Choice Television Awards	Best Animated Series	Archer	Nominated
2018	Webby Awards	Best Use of Augmented Reality	Archer, P.I. App	Nominated
2018	Saturn Awards	Best Animated Series or Film on Television	Archer	Nominated
