= Chozen =

American adult animated sitcom

- Genre: Animated sitcom
- Created by: Grant Dekernion
- Voices of: Bobby Moynihan; Michael Peña; Hannibal Buress; Nick Swardson; Kathryn Hahn; Danny McBride; Method Man; Gary Anthony Williams
- Country of origin: United States
- Original language: English
- No. of episodes: 13 (3 Unaired)

Production
- Executive producers: Grant Dekernion; David Gordon Green; Jody Hill; Brandon E. E. James; Danny McBride; Adam Reed; Matt Thompson; Tom Brady
- Producers: Brian Ash; Pat Piper; Eric Sims
- Running time: 21–23 minutes
- Production companies: Rough House Pictures; Floyd County Productions; FX Productions

Original release
- Network: FX
- Release: January 13 – March 31, 2014

Chozen is an American adult animated sitcom on FX. The series aired from January 13 to March 31, 2014, and which was created by Grant Dekernion. The show ran for one season.

== Plot ==
Chozen is a gay white gangsta rapper on a quest to rebuild his career after being released from prison.

== Production ==
Chozen was announced as the first original series pick-up for FXX, FX's spin-off network that launched in 2013, but was later reassigned to FX where it aired after Archer on Monday nights.

The series was a collaboration between the producers of Eastbound & Down and the producers of Archer.

On May 14, 2014, Chozen was cancelled after one season.

Chozen was released on DVD on December 16, 2014 exclusively through Amazon as a manufactured on demand (MOD) DVD-R set. The MOD double-disc set contains three previously unaired episodes.

== Characters ==
=== Main characters ===
- Phillip "Chozen" Cullens (voiced by Bobby Moynihan, singing voice provided by Grant DeKernion) – A 28-year-old, white, gay rapper. Framed for crimes he did not commit, he survived a 10-year prison sentence. Upon his release, he sets out to reclaim what is his. His music and lyrics take aim at the stereotypes of machismo and misogyny that are synonymous with rap music. Adding to the challenge of an already lofty set of goals, Chozen is ten years behind in areas crucial to a successful music career, such as technology and pop-culture in general.
- Crisco (voiced by Hannibal Buress) – A struggling rapper in his late twenties. Crisco previously worked entertaining children with positive rap lyrics. He is largely a gigolo, living rent-free as long as his girlfriend is sexually satisfied.
- Ricky (voiced by Michael Peña) – A DJ and fellow rapper who works alongside Crisco performing at kids' birthday parties. His catchphrase is finishing his sentences with "...and shit". He still lives at home (although he claims he lives in a separate unit).
- Tracy Cullens (voiced by Kathryn Hahn) – Chozen's college-aged sister. She had dreams of being an Olympic gymnast, now attends classes at Palm View University. She is the only character who calls her brother by his given name. Chozen moves in with her when he's released from prison. Tracy is disgusted and embarrassed by nearly everything her brother says and does, including making passes at male classmates, farting in public and masturbating while watching movies.
- Troy (voiced by Nick Swardson) – A stereotypical gamer and nerd. Troy is a college student who gets picked on by other students. He wants to ask Tracy out but he can't summon the courage to do so and competes against Ricky for her attention. Crisco and Ricky offer to help him lose his virginity the same way Ricky did, with a legendary (now middle-aged) Hispanic prostitute.
- Hunter (voiced by Ike Barinholtz) – An openly gay college student attending Palm View. He is Chozen's former lover. Hunter constantly pursues a real relationship while Chozen desires only sex, and avoids anything involving emotions and feelings. Hunter is gullible and naïve. He leaves Chozen in the episode "Boy's Night."
- Idris "Phantasm" Florentine (voiced by Method Man) – The reigning top rapper of the hip-hop world. He is the target of Chozen's hostility. Phantasm was a former member of Chozen's crew until he got fed up with his clean image. He framed Chozen for his own illegal activities, sending Chozen to prison and sparking his own rise to the top.
- Jameson Z. "Jimmy" Cromwell (voiced by Danny McBride) – A 39-year-old former roadie and pyrotechnics maker, now a member of Chozen's crew. A perverted, skinny metalhead. He has since embraced the digital realm and makes his own voyeurism videos for the Internet, such as cheerleader cleavage and panty shots and women's diving team accidents (which captures both the porn demographic and the fans of "epic fail" videos).

=== Other characters ===
- Jamal St. Clair (voiced by Gary Anthony Williams) – A black, gay inmate with a violent streak. Chozen's first lover. He was arrested by authorities for helping run Napster though he claims he also set a man on fire. A brutally sadistic man, he attempted to remove Chozen from his crew which escalated to a fight. Jamal redeems himself and saves Chozen from violating parole by attacking the cops. He was shot and killed by the police when escaping arrest. The black officer whose nose he broke was the one who fired first.
- Brooklyn Chan – The Asian-American Sneakerhead who owns the store "Laced". Chan operates his business via his smartphone. He offered Chozen's crew a gig when he heard they ran with Phantasm. But Chozen and Jamal's fist fight resulted in his store being looted.

== Episodes ==
No.	Title	Written by	Original release date	Prod. code	U.S. viewers (millions)
1	"Pilot"	Grant Dekernion	January 13, 2014	XXCZ01001	0.94
An aspiring rapper tries to get his life back on track after being released from prison.
2	"Love & Bottlerockets"	Grant Dekernion	January 20, 2014	XXCZ01002	0.69
When Chozen suspects Tracy's boyfriend is cheating on her, he takes matters into his own hands.
3	"Beef"	Brian Ash	January 27, 2014	XXCZ01003	0.61
A surprising job offer reunites Chozen with an old enemy.
4	"Da Director"	Christian Lander	February 3, 2014	XXCZ01004	0.69
Tracy and Chozen collaborate on a video while Ricky and Crisco attempt to get Troy laid.
5	"Laced"	Willie Block & Jake Emanuel	February 24, 2014	XXCZ01005	0.56
An old flame from prison comes between Chozen and the band as they prepare to perform at an exclusive party.
6	"I'm With the Contraband"	Story by : Brian Ash & Michael Jonathan Smith; Teleplay by : Brian Ash	March 3, 2014	XXCZ01006	0.49
Chozen launches an underground, anything goes bar at the university.
7	"Family Weekend (or How Gary Got His Groove Back)"	Shelby Fero	March 10, 2014	XXCZ01007	0.61
A campus visit turns into an unforgettable night for Chozen and Tracy's parents.
8	"Boy's Night"	Ryan Shiraki	March 17, 2014	XXCZ01008	0.49
Chozen and Hunter hit the hottest club in town, while Ricky and Crisco try to get exposure for their new song at a strip club, where Crisco reunites with a high school hottie with an embarrassing secret and Ricky becomes the sub to a brutal dominatrix.
9	"In A Pickle"	Mike Rowe	March 24, 2014	XXCZ01009	0.53
Chozen and his crew are picked to be the newest cast members for a kids' show, but while Crisco and Ricky are enjoying the perks of being kiddie show stars, Chozen and Ricky stumble upon the show runner's sinister plot to keep Chozen from being a music star.
10	"The Battle of Broken Spear"	Christian Lander	March 31, 2014	XXCZ01010	0.45
At the summer's biggest music festival, Chozen confronts his past and goes head-to-head with Phantasm.
11	"Sell, Sell, Sell"	Michael Jonathan Smith	Unaired	XXCZ01011	N/A
Back in the comfort of prison, Chozen confronts a new enemy.
12	"Soul Patch"	Brian Ash	Unaired	XXCZ01012	N/A
After an unfortunate series of events, Phantasm quits the rap game and finds love in a small town.
13	"Scurry Stories"	Christian Lander	Unaired	XXCZ01013	N/A
Chozen and his crew go busting after a legendary ghost said to haunt campus.

== Principal cast ==
- Bobby Moynihan as Chozen
- Hannibal Buress as Crisco
- Grant Dekernion as Chozen (singing voice)
- Kathryn Hahn as Tracy
- Paul Iacono as Fidget
- Method Man as Phantasm
- Danny McBride as Jimmy
- Michael Peña as Ricky
- Nick Swardson as Troy
- Gary Anthony Williams as Jamal

=== Additional voices ===
- Pamela Adlon
- Carlos Alazraqui
- Fred Armisen
- Tom Brady
- Affion Crockett
- Jevin Smith
- Drew Droege
- Paul Iacono
- J.K. Simmons
- Dana Snyder
- André Sogliuzzo
- Steve Staley
- Tara Strong
- Alan Tudyk
- Shuli Egar
- Gerald "Slink" Johnson
- Kerry Washington
- Lawrence Gilliard Jr.
- John DiMaggio
- Ed Asner
- Joy Bryant

== International broadcast ==
Chozen premiered in Australia on 5 January 2015 on The Comedy Channel.
