= Frisky Dingo =

American adult animated television series

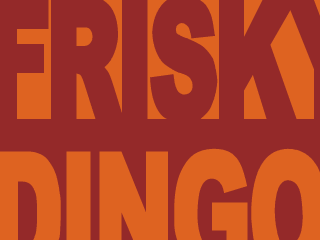
- Genre: Action; Comedy; Adult animation Animated sitcom
- Created by: Adam Reed; Matt Thompson
- Written by: Adam Reed; Matt Thompson
- Directed by: Adam Reed; Matt Thompson
- Voices of: Adam Reed; Christian Danley; Kelly Jenrette; Kate Miller; Killer Mike; Amber Nash; Scott Lipe; Stuart Culpepper; Mike Bell
- Composers: Casey Willis; Killer Mike
- Country of origin: United States
- Original language: English
- No. of seasons: 2
- No. of episodes: 25

Production
- Executive producers: Adam Reed; Matt Thompson; Keith Crofford; Mike Lazzo
- Running time: 11 minutes
- Production companies: 70/30 Productions; Williams Street

Original release
- Network: Adult Swim
- Release: October 15, 2006 – March 23, 2008

Related
- The Xtacles; Sealab 2021 Archer

Frisky Dingo is an American adult animated television series created by Adam Reed and Matt Thompson for Adult Swim. The series revolves around the conflict between a supervillain named Killface and his nemesis, a superhero named Awesome X, alias billionaire Xander Crews, and much of the show's humor focuses on parodying superhero and action-movie clichés.

It debuted on October 15, 2006, and its first season ended on January 21, 2007. The second season premiered on August 26, 2007, and ended on March 23, 2008. A third season was considered, but both the creators and Adult Swim mutually decided against it. The production company, 70/30 Productions, subsequently went out of business in January 2009; Reed and Thompson would later found Floyd County Productions.

A spin-off show, The Xtacles, premiered on November 9, 2008, but only the two-episode premiere aired prior to the production company's closure, with no further episodes produced.

== Origins ==
Frisky Dingo was created by 70/30 Productions, the same group of animators who worked on Sealab 2021. The show's name during development was Whiskey Tango. Because a band was already using the name, it was changed to Whiskey Tango Six. This name was determined not to be sufficiently distinct to avoid infringement suits, so the creators jokingly said they would call the show Frisky Dingo, and the name remained. In episode 13, Killface can be seen entering "Frisky Dingo" into the Annihilatrix launch terminal; this is mentioned in the second episode of the second season, where Sinn/Hooper remarks that "Frisky Dingo" is the launch code for the Annihilatrix.

According to an article in Atlanta Magazine, Whiskey Tango Six was going to be the name of the six-member superhero group on which the show focused, headed by husband and wife Jack and Grace Taggart. The team flew around in a spaceship called the Glennis. Killface was going to be the main villain, but not a major character. During revisions of the show's scripts, Killface became the focus of the show. When Whiskey Tango Six was replaced with Xander Crews/Awesome X and the Xtacles is not known.

== Characters ==
The two main characters of the show are Killface, who is a naked, bone-white, red-eyed, earless, talon-toed, spur-heeled, 7-foot-tall (2.1 m), 440 lb (200 kg), hairless, muscular humanoid supervillain focused on destroying Earth with his invention, the Annihilatrix; and billionaire tycoon Xander Crews, who fights crime under the superhero alias Awesome X. Both Killface and Xander are voiced by co-creator Adam Reed. The two have an ever-shifting relationship, changing from enemies to unwilling allies on many occasions.

Other major characters include Killface's son Simon – voiced by Christian Danley – an overweight, blond-haired, pale-skinned, sexually confused, teenaged Hannah Montana fan, who wears sweater vests and exhibits adolescent rebellion by muttering and breaking cereal bowls; reporter Grace Ryan, former girlfriend of Xander Crews turned into Antagone, a toxic, radioactive ant-powered villainess; Sinn – voiced by Kelly Jenrette – later known as Hooper, originally Killface's sidekick and later his enemy; and the Xtacles, Awesome X's team of easily distracted and remarkably inept, rocket-booted troops.

== Setting ==
Frisky Dingo takes place primarily in and around a large city simply called "Town" or "the Town". Its actual name never being mentioned becomes a running joke throughout the series. Despite its lack of a specific name, maps of "Town" are featured throughout the series, which closely resemble interstate roadmaps of the city of Atlanta, Georgia, where 70/30 Studios, producers of Frisky Dingo, were based. Additional evidence for "Town" being Atlanta is the presence of buildings suspiciously resembling the Cotton Mill Lofts (a location that at one time housed production operations for 70/30) burning in the second episode, "Meet Awesome-X". Also, in the episode where Killface is pandering to the African American church congregation, he is wearing what looks like Michael Vick's Atlanta Falcons football jersey.

== Episodes ==
=== Series overview ===
Season	Episodes	Originally released		
Season	Episodes	First released	Last released	Network
1	13	October 15, 2006	January 21, 2007	Adult Swim
2	12	August 26, 2007	March 23, 2008	Adult Swim

=== Season 1 (2006–07) ===
The first season of Frisky Dingo follows the adversarial relationship between the villainous Killface, who aspires to strike fear into humankind before he drives the Earth into the Sun with his Annihilatrix, and Awesome X, the secret superhero identity of multibillionaire Xander Crews, who dreads retiring after having defeated the last known supervillain.

No. overall	No. in season	Title	Original release date	Prod. code
1	1	"Meet Killface"	October 15, 2006	101
Killface reveals his plan to drive the Earth into the Sun, and forces the marketing staff he kidnapped to help him market the plan.
2	2	"Meet Awesome-X"	October 22, 2006	102
Having dispatched the last supervillain, superhero Awesome X (Xander Crews) searches for ways to avoid retiring his hero persona and having to actually work at running his company.
3	3	"Pimp My Revenue"	October 29, 2006	103
Thrilled at the prospect of a new supervillain to exploit and market, Xander sets his plans for Killface in motion. Killface, whose direct marketing of his plan to destroy the world has been unexpectedly successful (although for the reason being a snafu involving a typo), finds himself with the opportunity to appear on a morning talk show, which doesn't go the way he planned.
4	4	"XPO"	November 5, 2006	104
Killface is in desperate need of some cash, so when a mysterious fax arrives announcing an inventor's expo with a $12 billion prize, he decides to enter the Annihilatrix. However, the expo is staged by Xander Crews, who hopes to trick Killface into signing over his action figure rights.
5	5	"Kidnapped!"	November 12, 2006	105
Killface, desperate for cash and revenge, enacts a plan to find and kidnap billionaire Xander Crews. Meanwhile, Crews, still after action figure rights, enacts a plan to find and bribe Killface. Meanwhile, Grace Ryan's life hangs by her microphone's cord.
6	6	"Emergency Room"	November 19, 2006	106
The entire Dingo gang, grievously injured in the collapse of the Annihilatrix's catwalk, have all ended up in the same emergency room, and Killface has to deal with a lapsed health insurance plan and a very rude customer service telephone rep.
7	7	"Meet Antagone"	November 26, 2006	107
As Killface searches for Xander Crews, radioactive ants begin to take over Grace Ryan's mind and she transforms into voluptuous, ant-controlling supervillain Antagone, who has a hatred for Xander Crews. Antagone fights Killface during a bank robbery, blinding him with formic acid. Meanwhile, Crews is kidnapped by the Xtacles.
8	8	"Blind Faith"	December 3, 2006	108
Xander Crews copes with being broke and Xtacle-less, while Killface struggles with being blind.
9	9	"The Odd Couple"	December 10, 2006	109
Xander Crews, using the name Barnaby Jones, moves in with Killface; Simon runs away with all the knives; and Stan, posing as Awesome X, orders the Xtacles to find and kill Xander Crews.
10	10	"Flowers for Nearl"	December 17, 2006	110
The Xtacles find a replacement hostage for Xander Crews – his intellectually disabled twin brother, Nearl. However, made intelligent through an experimental brain chemical, Nearl decides to reveal a little family history about the Crews brothers that would've made things complicated.
11	11	"The Grate Escape"	January 7, 2007	111
Killface and Crews attempt to sneak into the lair of criminal kingpin Torpedo Vegas in order to save Simon.
12	12	"Penultimate Fighting"	January 14, 2007	112
Killface and Crews are captured by Torpedo Vegas and forced to fight to the death, gladiator-style, in lieu of the regular rabbit fights.
13	13	"Thrust Issues"	January 21, 2007	113
Killface and Crews attempt to return to their lives amidst multiple betrayals, but have one last score to settle with each other.

=== Season 2 (2007–08) ===
At the beginning of the second season, Killface is taking credit for "curing" global warming due to the Annihilatrix having moved the Earth a total of three feet further from the Sun before it malfunctioned, and has decided to run for President of the United States. Xander Crews follows suit, reforming his company and launching his own presidential campaign.

No. overall	No. in season	Title	Original release date	Prod. code
14	1	"Behold a Dark Horse"	August 26, 2007	201
The Annihilatrix malfunctions moments after being initiated, moving the Earth three feet away from the Sun and ending global warming. Instead of destroying the world, Killface decides to play the global warming card and run for the office of President of the United States.
15	2	"The Opposition"	September 2, 2007	202
Following the incident on the Annihilatrix, Xander Crews is found to be living in financial ruin behind an RV dealership. Running an 'outreach center' made from cardboard boxes, Xander offers services such as boiling used hypodermic needles and selling them back to the homeless. Upon hearing of Killface's candidacy for President, Xander decides to run against him after revealing that he had the check for his vast fortune in his possession the entire time.
16	3	"The Issues"	September 9, 2007	203
Xander proposes Fred Dryer as his running mate after gaining the Republican nomination for President. Aboard his new campaign jet (as opposed to Killface's campaign bus), Crews outlines his proposals to improve education and alleviate illegal immigration.
17	4	"The Image Problem"	September 16, 2007	204
Xander and Killface both try to improve their images by going duck hunting, which Xander cannot distinguish from his annual panda hunt, but the two manage to reconnect when they get lost after an assassination ploy by Valerie.
18	5	"The Miracle"	September 23, 2007	205
After Valerie miraculously fails at another assassination attempt, Killface finds God and quickly ruins his campaign. Upon hearing that Simon is a homosexual, Killface renounces Christianity as a missile strikes him in the chest.
19	6	"The Middle"	September 30, 2007	206
Killface begins to recuperate after the rocket incident while Xander again attempts to recruit Fred Dryer as his running mate, only to find that Sinn has taken over the Xtacles.
20 21	7 8	"The Debate" (Parts 1 and 2)	October 7, 2007 October 14, 2007	207; 208
Killface plans for the upcoming debate with Dottie, while Wendell looks into alternative campaign funds. Awesome X finds himself a prisoner along with Ronnie on board Xcalibur. While Killface prepares for the presidential debate, Xander makes a few stops with Ronnie before he arrives. Both Xander and Killface come to realize that neither of them is qualified or allowed to run for the presidency due to constitutional provisions they have both overlooked. Killface decides to follow up on his original plan to destroy the world.
22	9	"A Take on 'Hooper'"	March 2, 2008	209
Sinn and her 'Sisterhood of Chaos' (consisting of Valerie, Antagone, Watley, and the Decepticles, formerly the Xtacles) claim the Annihilatrix as their own, holding the world hostage. President Taqu'il, Xander, and Killface separately plan their own offensives to stop them.
23	10	"Wendell Goes Undercover Again"	March 9, 2008	210
Killface and Simon attempt to repair the burnt couplings on the Annihilatrix, while Stan and Taquil attempt an escape from their shot-down plane. Sinn and Valerie ask Watley to kill Antagone, while Wendell is sent by Xander to kill the giant ant baby. Both Wendell and Watley inadvertently fall in love with Antagone.
24	11	"Cody Gains a Namesake"	March 16, 2008	211
Valerie shoots Sinn and frames Wendell and Arthur. Xander learns he has an illegitimate daughter; when she comes to visit after her mother dies from cancer, Xander bribes her never to contact him again. Wendell decapitates Arthur when he tries to propose to Antagone. Antagone finally gives birth to her monster ant baby, which commits matricide by eating her head.
25	12	"Differences are Put Slightly Aside"	March 23, 2008	212
Wendell names the monster ant baby 'Cody 2' and rides it around town achieving orgasms on its back along the way. Everybody else races to the Annihilatrix, while the Deceptacles make a stew out of Arthur's decapitated body in the motel swimming pool. After killing Cody 2, Killface's alien brethren (including his mother) arrive to inquire about why the Earth has not yet been annihilated and why he is not wearing any clothes, to which Killface replies, "Funny story."

== International broadcast ==
In Canada, Frisky Dingo previously aired on Teletoon's Teletoon at Night block, and currently airs on the Canadian version of Adult Swim.

== Home releases ==
Title	Release date	No. of episodes	Additional information
Season One	March 25, 2008	13	Comes with a replica of Killface's 'Welcome to you're [sic] "doom!"' postcard
Season Two	January 6, 2009	12	Features a brand-new short made to tie in with the spin-off series The Xtacles (as a result, the DVD box says 13 episodes), also comes with a Frisky Dingo sticker

== The Xtacles ==
The Xtacles is a spin-off from Frisky Dingo in which the Xtacles, Xander Crews' private army, take a lead role. The series revolves around the Xtacles' lack of direction following the abduction of their leader by aliens at the end of Frisky Dingo. They take on random missions from President Stan, who returns from the previous series. The series premiered its only two episodes on November 9, 2008.

=== Episodes ===
No.	Title	Directed by	Written by	Original release date	Prod. code
1	"Operation: Mountain Punch"	Mack Williams & Matt Thompson	Christian Danley & Casey Willis	November 9, 2008	101
Paralyzed by a lack of leadership, The Xtacles struggle with the decision to decide about future decisions. Meanwhile, terrorists are systematically destroying the Rocky Mountains. Evil President Stan has no choice but to call on the Xtacles to stop the destruction of America's Favorite Mountain Range.
2	"Operation: Murderous Conclusions"	Mack Williams & Matt Thompson	Christian Danley & Casey Willis	November 9, 2008	102
The Xtacles are called upon once again by Evil President Stan to solve the mystery of who "desecrated" the President's extravagant new statue. Using their typical mix of rash judgment, and murderous conclusions, the Xtacles pin the crime on an innocent man. Case Closed.
