= 1973–74 United States network television schedule (late night) =

These are the late-night schedules for the three U.S. television networks during the 1973–74 season. All times are Eastern and Pacific.

PBS is not included, as member television stations had local flexibility with most of their schedules, and broadcast times for network shows might have varied. ABC and CBS are not included on the weekend schedules because those networks did not offer late-night programs of any kind on the weekend.

Talk/Variety shows are highlighted in yellow, Local News & Programs are highlighted in white.

== Monday-Friday ==
-	11:00 PM	11:30 PM	12:00 AM	12:30 AM	1:00 AM	1:30 AM	2:00 AM	2:30 AM	3:00 AM	3:30 AM	4:00 AM	4:30 AM	5:00 AM	5:30 AM
ABC	Local	ABC's Wide World of Entertainment			Local programming or sign-off
CBS	local programming	The CBS Late Movie				Local programming or sign-off
NBC	local programming	The Tonight Show Starring Johnny Carson			The Tomorrow Show (to 2:00; Mon.-Thur.)/The Midnight Special (Fri)			local programming or sign-off

== Saturday/Sunday ==
-	11:00 PM	11:30 PM	12:00 AM	12:30 AM	1:00 AM	1:30 AM	2:00 AM	2:30 AM	3:00 AM	3:30 AM	4:00 AM	4:30 AM	5:00 AM	5:30 AM
NBC	local programming	The Weekend Tonight Show			local programming or sign-off

== By network ==
=== ABC ===
Returning Series

- ABC's Wide World of Entertainment

Not returning from 1972 to 1973

- The Dick Cavett Show

=== CBS ===
Returning Series

- The CBS Late Movie

=== NBC ===
Returning Series

- The Midnight Special
- The Tonight Show Starring Johnny Carson
- The Weekend Tonight Show

New Series

- The Tomorrow Show
