= Floyd County Productions =

American animation studio

- Industry: Animation
- Predecessor: 70/30 Productions
- Founded: January 9, 2009; 17 years ago
- Founder: Adam Reed; Matt Thompson
- Headquarters: Atlanta, Georgia
- Key people: Matt Thompson (CEO); Jamie Moss
- Products: Television; Movies
- Website: floydcountyproductions.tv

Floyd County Productions is an American animation studio located in Atlanta, Georgia. It produces the animated TV shows Archer, Hit-Monkey, Unsupervised, Chozen, and Dicktown in addition to providing animation for various live-action shows (including the television shows Atlanta, Legion, Fargo, Goliath and It's Always Sunny in Philadelphia).

Floyd County's longest-running show Archer has received positive reviews from critics and won awards, including four Primetime Emmy Awards, four Critics Choice Awards, and three Clio Awards. The series has also received 15 Annie Award nominations, among others, for outstanding achievement in animation, writing, direction, and voice acting.

== History ==
The company was founded in 2009 by Adam Reed and Matt Thompson after they closed 70/30 Productions following the cancellation of the company's shows. Floyd County Productions grew from a small eight-person studio into a competitive animation house.

== Productions ==
=== Television series ===
Title	Year(s)	Notes
Archer	2009–23	
Unsupervised	2012	
It's Always Sunny in Philadelphia	2013	"The Gang Saves the Day" (animated sequence)
Chozen	2014	
The League	2015	"Adios y Bienvenidos" (animation)
Atlanta	2016	"BAN" (animated sequence)
Fargo	2017	"The Law of Non-Contradiction" (animation)
Legion	2018	"Chapter 16", "Chapter 19" (animation)
Bobcat Goldthwait's Misfits & Monsters	2018	"The Buzzkill"
Goliath	2018-19	Season 2 - Episode 5 - "Who's Gabriel", Season 3 - Episode 2 - "Happiness from the Ground Up" (animation)
Cake	2019–22	"Walt", "The Places Where We Live", "Missed Connections", "Greetings from Florida", "Shark Lords" and "Poorly Drawn Lines"
Dicktown	2020–22	
Hit-Monkey	2021–24	
Dogvvalker	2022	(animated short)
The Paloni Show! Halloween Special!	2022	"Camp Death Lake", "Megahex, Devil's Night" (animation)
Aqua Teen Hunger Force	2023	Season 12 (animation)

=== Feature Animation ===
Title	Year(s)	Notes
America: The Motion Picture	2021	Feature film; co-production with Netflix Animation Studios, Lord Miller Productions and Free Association; distributed by Netflix

=== Unaired productions ===
- Bigfoot (Not picked up)
- Cassius and Clay (Pilot episode produced but officially cancelled by FXX before first season started)
- Deadpool (Ended when Donald Glover, Stephen Glover, FX and Marvel Television parted ways)

== Accolades ==
Year	Award	Category	Nominee	Result
2010	NewNowNext Awards	Best Show You're Not Watching	Archer	Won
2011	Annie Awards	Best General Audience Animated TV/Broadcast Production	Archer	Nominated
2011	Critics' Choice Television Awards	Best Comedy Series	Archer	Nominated
2012	Annie Awards	Best General Audience Animated TV/Broadcast Production	Archer	Nominated
2012	Annie Awards	Character Design in a Television Production	Chad Hurd	Nominated
2012	Comedy Awards	Best Animated Comedy Series	Archer	Won
2012	Critics' Choice Television Awards	Best Animated Series	Archer	Won
2013	Annie Awards	Best General Audience Animated TV/Broadcast Production	Archer	Nominated
2013	Critics' Choice Television Awards	Best Animated Series	Archer	Won
2014	Annie Awards	Best General Audience Animated TV/Broadcast Production	Archer	Nominated
2014	Annie Awards	Outstanding Achievement in Storyboarding in an Animated TV/Broadcast Production	Adam Ford, et al.	Nominated
2014	Critics' Choice Television Awards	Best Animated Series	Archer	Won
2014	Primetime Emmy Award	Outstanding Animated Program	For "Archer Vice: The Rules Of Extraction"	Nominated
2015	Annie Awards	Best General Audience Animated TV/Broadcast Production	Archer	Nominated
2015	Annie Awards	Outstanding Achievement in Directing in an Animated TV/Broadcast Production	Bryan Fordney	Nominated
2015	Critics' Choice Television Awards	Best Animated Series	Archer	Won
2015	Primetime Emmy Award	Outstanding Animated Program	"Pocket Listing"	Nominated
2015	Primetime Emmy Award	Outstanding Creative Achievement in Interactive Media – Multiplatform Storytelling	Mark Paterson & Tim Farrell for "Archer Scavenger Hunt"	Won
2016	Annie Awards	Outstanding Achievement in Directing in an Animated TV/Broadcast Production	Bryan Fordney	Nominated
2016	Primetime Emmy Award	Outstanding Animated Program	"The Figgis Agency"	Won
2016	Primetime Emmy Award	Outstanding Creative Achievement in Interactive Media – Multiplatform Storytelling	Mark Paterson, Tim Farrell, & Bryan Fordney for "Archer Scavenger Hunt 2"	Won
2017	Primetime Emmy Award	Outstanding Animated Program	"Archer Dreamland: No Good Deed"	Nominated
2017	Critics' Choice Television Awards	Best Animated Series	Archer	Nominated
2017	Clio Award - Gold Medal	Television/Streaming: Digital/Mobile - App	Archer, P.I. App	Won
2017	Clio Award - Gold Medal	Television/Streaming: Digital/Mobile - Games	Archer, P.I. App	Won
2018	Annie Awards	Outstanding Achievement for Writing in an Animated Television/Broadcast Production	Adam Reed	Nominated
2018	Critics' Choice Television Awards	Best Animated Series	Archer	Nominated
2018	Webby Awards	Best Use of Augmented Reality	Archer, P.I. App	Nominated
2018	Saturn Awards	Best Animated Series or Film on Television	Archer	Nominated
2019	Critics' Choice Television Awards	Best Animated Series	Archer	Nominated
2020	Primetime Emmy Award	Outstanding Individual Achievement in Animation - Background Design	Jill Dykxhoorn for Archer	Won
2020	Sundance Award	Best Animated Short Film	The Places Where We Live - Hudson Geese	Nominated
