= Hit-Monkey (TV series) =

2021–2024 animated superhero series

- Genre: Superhero
- Created by: Will Speck; Josh Gordon
- Based on: Hit-Monkey by: Daniel Way; Dalibor Talajić
- Showrunners: Will Speck; Josh Gordon
- Directed by: Neal Holman; Kevin Mellon
- Starring: Ally Maki; Olivia Munn; Nobi Nakanishi; Fred Tatasciore; George Takei; Jason Sudeikis; Leslie Jones; Cristin Milioti
- Composer: Daniel Rojas
- Country of origin: United States
- Original language: English
- No. of seasons: 2
- No. of episodes: 20

Production
- Executive producers: Grant Gish; Joe Quesada; Karim Zreik; Jeph Loeb; Josh Gordon; Will Speck
- Producers: Duffy Boudreau; Molly Brock; Marcus Rosentater
- Running time: 22–27 minutes
- Production companies: Speck Gordon Inc.; Floyd County Productions; Marvel Television (season 1); 20th Television Animation (season 2)

Original release
- Network: Hulu
- Release: November 17, 2021 – July 15, 2024

Related
- M.O.D.O.K.

Marvel's Hit-Monkey is an American adult animated television series created by Will Speck and Josh Gordon for Hulu, based on the Marvel Comics character Hit-Monkey. The series was produced by Marvel Television for its first season and by 20th Television Animation for its second season, with Gordon and Speck serving as showrunners.

The series stars Ally Maki, Olivia Munn, Fred Tatasciore, and Jason Sudeikis, with Nobi Nakanishi and George Takei joining for the first season, and Leslie Jones and Cristin Milioti in the second. Hit-Monkey was announced and ordered at Hulu in February 2019, as part of a group of series based on Marvel characters that were intended to lead to a crossover special titled The Offenders, with it being produced by Marvel Television. Oversight of the series was moved to Marvel Studios in December 2019 when Marvel Television was folded into that company. 20th Television Animation produced the second season. Animation for the series is provided by Floyd County Productions.

Hit-Monkey debuted the entirety of its ten-episode first season on Hulu on November 17, 2021. The series was met with generally positive reviews from critics for its animation, voice acting, action scenes, plot, and faithfulness to the source material of the comics. In February 2023, the series was renewed for a second ten-episode season, which was released on July 15, 2024.

== Plot ==
Monkey is a wronged Japanese macaque who is mentored by the ghost of an American assassin named Bryce Fowler as he damages the crime underworlds of the city of Tokyo (in season 1) and eventually travelling to New York City (in season 2).

== Cast ==
=== Main ===
- Ally Maki as Haruka, a good honest cop who wants to fight the injustice in Tokyo.
- Olivia Munn as Akiko Yokohama / Lady Bullseye II, the smart, ambitious, and mentally unstable niece of Shinji, who at firsts bonds with Monkey, but with the death of her uncle she becomes his self-declared nemesis.
- Nobi Nakanishi as Ito (season 1), Haruka's partner who has problems, but trusts Monkey.
- Fred Tatasciore as Monkey, a Japanese macaque who becomes the assassin Hit-Monkey.
- George Takei as Shinji Yokohama (season 1; guest season 2), a kind politician with a lot on his shoulders.
- Jason Sudeikis as Bryce Fowler (né McHenry), Monkey's mentor who dies and comes back to aid him as a ghost.
- Leslie Jones as Eunice Jones (season 2), Bryce's foul-mouthed former agent.
- Cristin Milioti as Iris McHenry (season 2), Bryce's abandoned daughter, who grew up vowing to not become like her father before realizing their similarities and a possible reconciliation. Iris first appears in the first season as a child.

=== Guest ===
- Paul Nakauchi as Itaru Ozu (season 1)
- Noshir Dalal as Fat Cobra (season 1), a large sumo assassin who can produce lightning from his feet.
  - Dalal also voices Kenuichio Harada / Silver Samurai (season 1), Japan's biggest hero who is also very conceited.
- Reiko Aylesworth as Maki Matsumoto / Lady Bullseye, a terrifying assassin who relentlessly kills without remorse or hesitation.
  - Aylesworth also voices Yuki (season 1), a spirit tied to Japan who sees Monkey as a true warrior.
- Keith David as Lucifer, the Devil (season 2), the ruler of Hell who sends Bryce back to Earth to coerce Monkey into killing more.
- Rob Corddry as Buddy (season 2), a crime scene cleaner.
- Emi Lo as Dot (season 2), a little girl with magnanimous supernatural powers and a member of the Co-Op.
- Stephanie Beatriz as Amara (season 2), an ancient Grecian woman who was turned into a living marble statue and is a member of the Co-Op.
- Tramell Tillman as Double-Tap (season 2), a surviving veteran who specializes in fire arms and a member of the Co-Op.
- Nat Faxon as Boone (season 2), leader of the Co-Op and who possesses powerful psychic abilities.
- Sonny Valicenti as Slyke (season 2), Boone's brother and a member of the Co-Op with powerful mental abilities.
- Jim Gaffigan as Snail (season 2), a time-bending hustler.
- Ivana Miličević as Danke (season 2), a professional assassin and Iris' love interest.

== Episodes ==
Seasons of Marvel's Hit-Monkey
Season	Episodes	Originally released
1	10	November 17, 2021
2	10	July 15, 2024

=== Season 1 (2021) ===
No. overall	No. in season	Title	Directed by	Written by	Original release date
1	1	"Pilot"	Neal Holman	Josh Gordon & Will Speck	November 17, 2021
Bryce Fowler, an upbeat assassin, is hired by a third party to kill a progressive politician Ken Takahara in Japan. He succeeds and also ends up killing the partner of police officer Ito. As he begins to feel remorse for his actions, Bryce is betrayed by his employer and attacked by his goons. Although severely wounded, Bryce manages to escape, fleeing to the snowy mountains. A tribe of intelligent snow monkeys rescue Bryce and begin nursing him back to health. Bryce takes an interest in a particularly aggressive monkey who distrusts him and witnesses his training. The aggressive monkey, whom Bryce simply names "Monkey", is banished from the tribe for harming another monkey, but as he leaves witnessing the assassins coming, who mortally wound Bryce before killing the other monkeys for amusement. Taking Bryce's firearms, Monkey slaughters the assassins in rage. With his dying words, Bryce declares that Monkey must pursue the assassins' employer. Monkey heads to a train station with Bryce's weapons and is suddenly joined by his ghost.
2	2	"Bright Lights, Big City"	Neal Holman	Josh Gordon & Will Speck	November 17, 2021
Monkey, later professionally dubbed Hit-Monkey, finds himself unable to lose Bryce's ghost as he arrives in Tokyo. Bryce leads the monkey to a fish warehouse where he received his mission to kill Takahara. They encounter the deranged old woman who supplied Bryce's guns and accidentally kill her, although steal her money to afford a hotel. Meanwhile, Takahara's running mate Shinji Yokohama is convinced by his niece and speech writer Akiko to run in his stead. Lieutenant Ito is given a new partner, the young upstart Haruka, who is aware of his flaws. Monkey spots a General whom Bryce deduces to be involved, and tracks him to Takahara's funeral where Yokohama announces his intent to run. Bryce witnesses the General talking to his unseen employer while Monkey steals a suit and kills a group of Yakuza thugs, triggering a shoot-out between Yakuza members. Monkey kills the Yakuza, rescues Akiko, and attacks the General, who is killed by a bus, leaving his wallet behind. Akiko and Yokohama return home safely as Monkey and Bryce watch. Ito and Haruka see security footage of Monkey in action.
3	3	"Legend of the Drunken Monkey"	Neal Holman	Keith Foglesong	November 17, 2021
While arguing about having to kill, Monkey and Bryce encounter Master Izo, a blind monk who can communicate with them, declaring that they are bound and must work together. Haruka informs the police department about Monkey's involvement, only to be laughed off; while Yokohama and Akiko are confronted by Takahara's opponent, Ozu. Bryce and Monkey find the General's home and ignite a deadly shoot-out between two military soldiers and two Yakuza members. Deducing that the General had gambling debts to pay, they sneak into a casino owned by the twins Keppei and Teppei. Monkey is discovered and forced by Bryce to pretend to be entertainment. To advance to the top floor and meet the twins, they begin gambling, although Monkey develops a drinking problem to get over his pain and dislike of killing. After Monkey is captured by the twins, revealed to be the sons of the old woman, Bryce finally admits that being a killer is not easy. Monkey then kills his captors and picks up a finance book, discovering the address of a man named The Accountant, who paid for Takahara's assassination.
4	4	"The Code"	Neal Holman	Duffy Boudreau	November 17, 2021
The address leads Bryce and Monkey to a prison, which they infiltrate while arguing about Monkey's code. Monkey is captured by the warden, but escapes and learns that the Accountant is located in a closed-off area of the prison called "The Pit". Meanwhile, Akiko is run off the road by Ozu's promotional team, although Yokohama tells her not to call the press to avoid an incident. Within the Pit, Monkey and Bryce meet the Accountant, who forces them to battle Fat Cobra. Monkey wins, but refuses to kill Cobra, instead teaming up with him to defeat the Accountant. Monkey chases the Accountant to a hidden luxury room, where he reveals that he was hired by The Rooster to fund Takahara's assassination before being killed by his own men. The Warden starts a raid, but Monkey and Bryce are able to escape thanks to a rat Monkey saved earlier. Afterwards, Monkey visits Akiko who thanks him for saving her. News of Monkey's actions spread, validating Ito and Haruka's claims.
5	5	"Run Monkey Run"	Neal Holman	Matteo Borghese & Rob Turbovsky	November 17, 2021
The Yakuza's leaders, including the Rooster, join to place a bounty on Monkey. After being tailored for a new suit, Monkey is attacked by various assassins, making Bryce jealous of his success. Akiko discloses Ozu's supposed attack on her to the press, earning Yokohama's ire, while Ito expresses sympathy to Monkey's cause after he kills a corrupt officer. Yuki, a ghostly assassin, attacks Monkey and Bryce to prevent them from killing. While fighting Yuki and a street racer named Eiko, Monkey saves Ito from being run over, separately convincing both him and Yuki that he is good. Monkey is then captured by The Poacher, and Bryce admits that he is jealous. Together, they kill the Poacher and slaughter the Yakuza leaders, while Rooster is arrested by the police. With their apartment destroyed by Yuki, Monkey decides to stay with Akiko, which she allows.
6	6	"The Long Goodbye"	Neal Holman	Albertina Rizzo	November 17, 2021
Akiko is visited by Ito and Haruka who inform her that the Rooster has been arrested, but due to his connections is being let go. Monkey and Bryce take the opportunity to assassinate him, with Bryce believing that this will let his spirit finally rest. They kill a man they believe to be the Rooster, only to find that he has numerous doubles, none of which releases Bryce. Monkey spares a portly double, and kills the supposedly real Rooster as another assassin tries to do the same. Ito reveals to Haraka that he took the fall for his former partner during a corruption investigation in the past, earning her trust. Monkey forces the portly double to take him to the bank and unlock a box using a key left by Rooster; however, the double turns out to be the real Rooster in disguise, and he attacks Monkey. Believing that he will soon ascend, Bryce reveals that he has a daughter and wants Monkey to look after her. Monkey kills Rooster, but Bryce is still bound to him, forcing them to return to Akiko with the box. In response to his minions' failure, the Yakuza's mysterious benefactor hires the assassin Lady Bullseye.
7	7	"Sayonara Monkey"	Neal Holman	Ken Kobayashi	November 17, 2021
Bryce and Monkey visit the monk, who uses salt to deter Bryce and states that Monkey must lead them to salvation. Yokohama fires Akiko when Ozu turns her claims against them. The zoo's snow monkeys are killed, which Bryce realizes to be the work of Lady Bullseye, while Haruka deduces that Monkey is staying with Akiko. As Monkey and Bryce prepare for Lady Bullseye, Akiko, Ito and Haruka arrive. Lady Bullseye blows up Akiko's house, fatally wounds Ito, and gives chase to Monkey throughout Tokyo. Monkey escapes and visits a recovering Akiko in the hospital, becoming overwhelmed with grief. Ito dies, and Haruka leaves the police in disgust. Believing that Bryce has ruined his life, Monkey traps him in a salt circle and returns to the mountains, where he spots a new tribe of snow monkeys.
8	8	"Home Sweet Home"	Neal Holman	Paul Levitt	November 17, 2021
Abandoning his old life, Monkey rescues a young snow monkey named Koji from a violent tribe called the Red Stripes and is indoctrinated into the new tribe. Monkey bonds with Koji, and decides to train the tribe to fight back when the Red Stripes plot to steal their spring. During the fight, Koji is killed, driving Monkey to don his suit and kill the Red Stripe's leader, scaring his new family away. The ghost of his tribe's Alpha appears, declaring that he must protect both humans and monkeys as a "killer of killers". Affected by the salt, Bryce relives his past as Bryce McHenry, where he met his girlfriend Hayley and sired a daughter named Iris. Bryce learns that his mom's latest boyfriend, Eli, has terrible connections which come back to haunt his family. Bryce accidentally kills Eli during a confrontation and goes on the run, leaving his family with Eli's stolen money. Recalling the Alpha spirit's words, Monkey finds Bryce's frozen corpse in the snow. He mournfully buries both Koji and his partner side-by-side, in twin cairns, before departing the mountains for good. He then reunites with Bryce, strengthening their bond. However, they soon realize that there is only a day left for the election.
9	9	"The End: Part One"	Neal Holman	Duffy Boudreau & Keith Foglesong	November 17, 2021
Monkey and Bryce return to Akiko's house where the latter begins to fade in and out of existence. They reunite with Haruka and Akiko, who reveal that Rooster's pen is a recording device; the recording states that Ichiro Hazaki, the Bonsai Master, is the Yakuza's benefactor. While Hakura and Akiko, alongside Yuki and the Silver Samurai, protect Yokohama at his election viewing party, Bryce and Monkey head to Bonsai Master's compound to kill him and Ozu. Lady Bullseye kills the tailor and the monk, deducing Monkey's connection to Bryce and the latter's continued existence as a ghost. Monkey and Bryce fight their way to Bonsai Master, who declares his intentions to restore Japan to its feudal era. Yokohama is declared the new prime minister, and Akiko is approached by Lady Bullseye. Monkey defeats Bonsai Master, who commits seppuku, and approaches Ozu. However, Ozu declares that he was not involved in Takahara's death as he had nothing to gain, leading Monkey and Bryce to realize that Yokohama is responsible.
10	10	"The End: Part Two"	Neal Holman	Josh Gordon & Will Speck	November 17, 2021
Monkey and Bryce recruit Haruka and Yuki to infiltrate the party and confront Yokohama. However, Monkey is discovered, igniting a riot between Monkey's supporters and the police. With help from Yuki and Fat Cobra, Monkey escapes Silver Samurai and fights Lady Bullseye, Yokohama's bodyguard, who overpowers him and tortures Bryce with salt. Using the salt, Bryce manages to make himself partially tangible, distracting Lady Bullseye long enough for Haruka to kill her. Yokohama escapes to the roof with Akiko, and regretfully declares his involvement in Takahara's death, having become tired of him losing elections and being offered support from Bonsai Master. Monkey arrives to kill Yokohama, but Bryce decides to talk him down, which allows him to finally ascend. As Haruka goes to arrest Yokohama, he grabs her gun, forcing Monkey to shoot him; devastating Akiko. Haruka sneaks Monkey out of Japan while promising to clear his name. Not wanting to leave Monkey alone, Bryce returns from Hell, now possessing the ability to interact with objects after making a deal with Lucifer. In the morgue, Akiko vows revenge on Monkey, and takes Lady Bullseye's mask.

=== Season 2 (2024) ===
No. overall	No. in season	Title	Directed by	Written by	Original release date	Prod. code
11	1	"Chapter One: Return to Sender"	Kevin Mellon	Josh Gordon & Will Speck	July 15, 2024	2ZEK01
12	2	"Chapter Two: Guess Who's Coming To Dinner?"	Kevin Mellon	Jessica Poter	July 15, 2024	2ZEK02
13	3	"Chapter Three: The Rope"	Kevin Mellon	Paul Levitt	July 15, 2024	2ZEK03
14	4	"Chapter Four: Never Too Late"	Kevin Mellon	Keith Foglesong	July 15, 2024	2ZEK04
15	5	"Chapter Five: Akiko"	Kevin Mellon	Isabelle Esposito	July 15, 2024	2ZEK05
16	6	"Chapter Six: The Estate"	Kevin Mellon	Tesha Kondrat	July 15, 2024	2ZEK06
17	7	"Chapter Seven: The Last Supper"	Kevin Mellon	Josh Gordon & Will Speck and Jessica Poter	July 15, 2024	2ZEK07
18	8	"Chapter Eight: Mind Mall"	Kevin Mellon	Keith Foglesong and Jessica Poter	July 15, 2024	2ZEK08
19	9	"Chapter Nine: The Concrete Jungle"	Kevin Mellon	Tesha Kondrat and Paul Levitt	July 15, 2024	2ZEK09
20	10	"Chapter Ten: History Lessons"	Kevin Mellon	Josh Gordon & Will Speck and Neal Holman	July 15, 2024	2ZEK10

== Production ==
=== Development ===
In February 2019, Marvel Television announced an adult animated television series based on Hit-Monkey, with a series order at the streaming service Hulu, along with M.O.D.O.K. and ones based on Tigra and Dazzler together, as well as Howard the Duck, that were intended to lead up to a crossover special titled The Offenders. The series was created by Will Speck and Josh Gordon, both of whom were expected to write for the series and executive produce alongside Jeph Loeb. That December, Marvel Television was folded into Marvel Studios, which carried subsequent oversight of the series. The following month in 2020, Marvel decided not to move forward with Howard the Duck, Tigra & Dazzler, and The Offenders, with M.O.D.O.K. and Hit-Monkey continuing as planned. M.O.D.O.K. co-creator Jordan Blum commented in the following year that the series has a different animation style from M.O.D.O.K.. In January 2022, Hulu's head of content Craig Erwich said that additional seasons of Hit-Monkey would be determined solely by the Marvel Studios team. With the cancellation of M.O.D.O.K. in May 2022, Variety reported Hit-Monkey was also not expected to be renewed. However, the series was renewed in February 2023, with 20th Television Animation taking over production of the series, given Marvel Television no longer existed. At this time it was reported that the series would no longer featured "Marvel's" in its name, though the Marvel logo would still be attached to the series "in other ways". The second season was ultimately still formally called Marvel's Hit-Monkey. Animation for the series is provided by Floyd County Productions.

=== Casting ===
In September 2021, it was revealed that Jason Sudeikis would voice Hit-Monkey's mentor/partner Bryce, along with Fred Tatasciore as Monkey / Hit-Monkey, with George Takei, Olivia Munn, Ally Maki, and Nobi Nakanishi also starring. Tatasciore, Sudeikis, Munn, and Maki return for the second season, with Leslie Jones and Cristin Milioti joining the cast.

== Release ==
The first season of Hit-Monkey premiered on November 17, 2021, on Hulu in the United States, with all ten episodes released. Internationally, the series was released on January 26, 2022, on Disney+, Disney+ Hotstar and Star+ in Latin America. The second season was released in the United States with all ten episodes on July 15, 2024. It was released in Australia on August 7, 2024.

== Reception ==
=== Critical response ===
For the first season, the review aggregator website Rotten Tomatoes reports an 84% approval rating with an average rating of 7.0/10 based on 19 critic reviews. The website's critical consensus reads: "If Marvel's Hit-Monkey is never as thrillingly original as its title might suggest, vibrant animation and a solid voice cast keep things consistently watchable."

For the second season, Rotten Tomatoes reports an 83% approval rating with an average rating of 7.0/10 based on 6 critic reviews. Metacritic, which uses a weighted average, assigned a score of 57 out of 100 based on 6 critics, indicating "mixed or average reviews".

Kristen Reid of Paste stated that the animation of Hit-Monkey is remarkable with its inspiration of Japanese animation, and claimed that the level of violence and lack of morality is refreshing compared to the Marvel Cinematic Universe, while finding the sense of humor of the series entertaining despite its lack of originality. Brenton Stewart of Comic Book Resources found Hit-Monkey unique and refreshing through its animation compared to other high-quality Marvel productions, stating that the company should continue to provide more adult animated projects that take risks. Stephen Robinson of The A.V. Club gave the series a A− rating, saying that Hit-Monkey manages to be one of the best recent Marvel TV shows created, while praising the animation and the development of the villains, and complimenting the performance and chemistry of the cast. Siddhant Adlakha of IGN rated the series 7 out of 10 and found the animation of the series impressive, and complimented how the plot and the visual elements manage to balance between humor and gore, despite saying that the characters feel more American than Japanese through their dialogues and mannerism. John Townsend of Starburst rated the series 3 out of 5 stars, saying that Marvel Television successfully provides a show with an inventive and clever humor, making less-known Marvel characters likable.

=== Accolades ===
Hit-Monkey was nominated for Outstanding Color Grading – Animated Episode or Non-Theatrical Feature at the 2024 Hollywood Professional Association Awards.
