= Adam Reed =

American actor

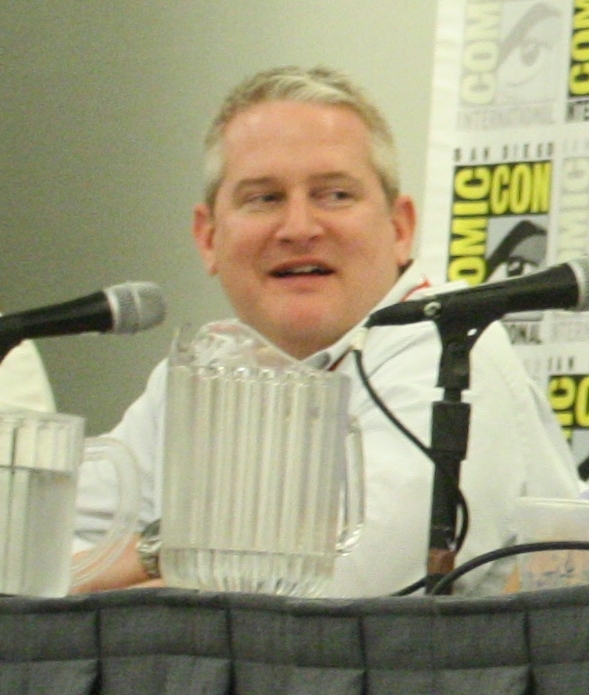
- Reed at the 2010 San Diego Comic-Con
- Born: Adam Brooks Reed; January 8, 1970 (age 56); Asheville, North Carolina, U.S.
- Education: University of North Carolina at Chapel Hill
- Occupations: Voice actor, animator, screenwriter, producer, director
- Years active: 1994–present
- Notable work: Sealab 2021, Frisky Dingo, 12 Oz. Mouse, Archer
- Website: floydcountyproductions.tv

Adam Brooks Reed (born January 8, 1970) is an American voice actor, animator, screenwriter, television producer and television director. Reed created, wrote, and voice acted for the FX/FXX adult animated comedy series Archer, which premiered in September 2009. He also voice acted, wrote, directed and produced the television series Sealab 2021 and Frisky Dingo, with his co-creator and creative partner Matt Thompson.

== Early work ==
Reed graduated from the University of North Carolina at Chapel Hill in 1992 with a degree in English. He was hired as an intern at Turner Broadcasting thanks to his sister's connections, where his first job consisted of reviewing episodes of The Flintstones to be distributed on VHS as part of a promotion with Little Debbie, developing both an encyclopedic knowledge and appreciation for the series in the process. Reed would eventually meet his future creative partner Matt Thompson, who was working in the on-air department as an associate producer at the time. The two soon collaborated on various Cartoon Network On-Air projects where they were credited together as "Butterbean." In 1994, Thompson pitched High Noon Toons as a mid-day programming block for the network. High Noon Toons was hosted by cowboy hand puppets Haas (Thompson) and Lil' Jo (Reed), both referencing characters on Bonanza. This culminated in a primetime special series, Hoot'Nanny, where Reed and Thompson traveled to various European cities to shoot footage for the special as Haas and Li'l Jo. The two were frequently drunk during filming. Once in 1995, the duo were reprimanded for lighting one of the prop sets on fire.

In 1995, Reed was told to write the live action segments for Carrot Top's A.M. Mayhem, a two-hour morning block of cartoons hosted by Scott "Carrot Top" Thompson. Reed described the experience as "a nightmare," placing most of the blame on Thompson's manager, who he described as "an unfunny person approving your jokes." It was during this time where he and Matt Thompson came up with the idea for what would eventually become Sealab 2021, but the network wanted Reed to continue writing for A.M. Mayhem. In response, Reed resigned from Turner. Thompson resigned shortly after. Prior to leaving, both stole the source footage material for Sealab 2020 from the network.

Reed and Thompson moved to New York, where they would spend a year working production in the "sordid underbelly" of daytime talk shows. Soon they were working for Showtime, and "making more money than we ever thought possible," according to Reed. During this period, the duo produced two amateur pilots for Sealab in their spare time using the stolen footage, which they would later send unsolicited to Cartoon Network's then vice president of development, Mike Lazzo. Due to their boss at Showtime having an unforeseen accident, Reed and Thompson suddenly find themselves unemployed. In response, Reed booked a getaway trip to Europe. As he was about to leave for the airport, Lazzo called Reed wanting to greenlight Sealab.

== Companies ==
Reed and Thompson formed 70/30 Productions when they created Sealab 2021, one of the first original series for Adult Swim. The company's name came from the plan that Reed would do 70% of the writing and 30% of the producing, with Thompson doing the reverse.

The pair became known for their work on a number of other Adult Swim projects, including Frisky Dingo, which aired for several years after Sealab 2021 was cancelled.

In 2009, Reed and Thompson closed 70/30 Productions and formed Floyd County Productions to produce Reed's new project, the FX/FXX series Archer. The company not only develops exclusive programming but also creates content for other media, including the television shows Atlanta, Legion, Fargo, Goliath and It's Always Sunny in Philadelphia. In 2020, After numerous years of hard work, Reed decided to officially retire and sold the remainder of the company to Thompson.

== Archer ==
After the cancellation of Frisky Dingo in 2008, Reed took a vacation to Spain to brainstorm ideas for a new project. His experience traversing the Vía de la Plata, and people-watching in Plaza Mayor in nearby Salamanca, enabled him to conceptualize his vision of Archer. Reed recalled in an interview:

So I sat on the Plaza Mayor for three days – drinking either coffee or beer or gin, depending on the time of day – surrounded by these Spanish women who seemed both unaware and completely aware of their beauty. Occasionally they would glance over – and catch me gaping at them – and just smile at me like, "I know, right?" And for three days, I couldn't even splutter "Buenos dias" to any of them – not once. And thus was Sterling Archer born – he would've absolutely sauntered over to a table full of those women and sat down and ordered an entire case of cava or whatever.

Nevertheless, he believed developing a sitcom with the theme of global espionage was inevitable given his proclivity for adventure-driven comedy. Archer was originally pitched under the working title Duchess.

Archer drew inspiration from a variety of sources, including the James Bond franchise, OSS 117: Cairo, Nest of Spies (2006), and The Pink Panther franchise. The show's hallmarks included reference-heavy humor, rapid-fire dialogue, and meta-comedy. Archer was produced using limited animation and took its visual style from mid-century comic art. Cast members recorded their lines individually, with the show regularly employing guest actors and actresses for supporting characters. There were 145 episodes broadcast in the show's history.

Archer received positive reviews from critics and won four Primetime Emmy Awards, four Critics Choice Awards, and three Clio Awards. The series also received 15 Annie Award nominations for outstanding achievement in animation, writing, direction, and voice acting.

== Filmography ==
=== Television ===
Year	Title	Role	Notes
1994–95	High Noon Toons	Lil' Jo	Also writer and producer
2000–05	Sealab 2021	Dr. Virjay, Mardock, Various	Also co-creator, writer and executive producer
2005–07; 2018	12 oz. Mouse	Shark	Actor; 22 episodes
2006–08	Frisky Dingo	Killface, Xander Crews / Awesome X, Ronnie, Wendell T. Stamps, Nearl Crews	Also co-creator, writer and executive producer
2008	The Xtacles	—N/a	Also co-creator, writer and executive producer
2007	That Crook'D 'Sipp	Beauregard Beauxregard VIII	Pilot; actor
2008–09	Robot Chicken	King Randor, Tony Stark / Iron Man, NASCAR President, Jerry Lawler	Actor; 3 episodes
2009–23	Archer	Ray Gillette, Bilbo, Captain Reynaud	Also creator, director (season 1–6), writer (season 1–10) and executive producer
2012	Unsupervised	—N/a	Executive producer
2014	Chozen	—N/a	Executive producer
2026	Robot Chicken Adult Swim Special	Killface	Actor; Television Special

== Awards and honors ==
Year	Award	Category	Nominee	Result
2010	NewNowNext Awards	Best Show You're Not Watching	Archer	Won
2011	Annie Awards	Best General Audience Animated TV/Broadcast Production	Archer	Nominated
2011	Critics' Choice Television Awards	Best Comedy Series	Archer	Nominated
2012	Annie Awards	Best General Audience Animated TV/Broadcast Production	Archer	Nominated
2012	Comedy Awards	Best Animated Comedy Series	Archer	Won
2012	Critics' Choice Television Awards	Best Animated Series	Archer	Won
2013	Annie Awards	Best General Audience Animated TV/Broadcast Production	Archer	Nominated
2013	Critics' Choice Television Awards	Best Animated Series	Archer	Won
2014	Annie Awards	Best General Audience Animated TV/Broadcast Production	Archer	Nominated
2014	Critics' Choice Television Awards	Best Animated Series	Archer	Won
2014	Primetime Emmy Award	Outstanding Animated Program	For "Archer Vice: The Rules Of Extraction"	Nominated
2015	Annie Awards	Best General Audience Animated TV/Broadcast Production	Archer	Nominated
2015	Critics' Choice Television Awards	Best Animated Series	Archer	Won
2015	Primetime Emmy Award	Outstanding Animated Program	"Pocket Listing"	Nominated
2015	Primetime Emmy Award	Outstanding Creative Achievement in Interactive Media – Multiplatform Storytelling	Mark Paterson & Tim Farrell for "Archer Scavenger Hunt"	Won
2016	Primetime Emmy Award	Outstanding Animated Program	"The Figgis Agency"	Won
2016	Primetime Emmy Award	Outstanding Creative Achievement in Interactive Media – Multiplatform Storytelling	Mark Paterson, Tim Farrell, & Bryan Fordney for "Archer Scavenger Hunt 2"	Won
2017	Primetime Emmy Award	Outstanding Animated Program	"Archer Dreamland: No Good Deed"	Nominated
2018	Annie Awards	Outstanding Achievement for Writing in an Animated Television/Broadcast Production	Adam Reed	Nominated
2018	Critics' Choice Television Awards	Best Animated Series	Archer	Nominated
2018	Webby Awards	Best Use of Augmented Reality	Archer, P.I. App	Nominated
2018	Saturn Awards	Best Animated Series or Film on Television	Archer	Nominated
