= Sealab 2020 =

American animated television series

- Created by: Alex Toth
- Directed by: William Hanna; Joseph Barbera
- Voices of: John Stephenson; Ross Martin; Josh Albee; Pamelyn Ferdin; William Callaway; Jerry Dexter; Ann Jillian
- Country of origin: United States
- Original language: English
- No. of seasons: 1
- No. of episodes: 13

Production
- Producers: William Hanna; Joseph Barbera
- Running time: 20 minutes
- Production company: Hanna-Barbera Productions

Original release
- Network: NBC
- Release: September 9 – December 2, 1972

Related
- Sealab 2021

Sealab 2020 is an American animated television series produced by Hanna-Barbera Productions and broadcast on NBC from September 9 to December 2, 1972, on Saturday mornings. The series was created by Alex Toth, who also created such other Hanna-Barbera cartoons as Space Ghost and Birdman and the Galaxy Trio.

A parody follow-up series, entitled Sealab 2021, originally aired on Cartoon Network in December 2000, then on Adult Swim from September 2, 2001 to April 24, 2005.

== Plot ==
The series took place in the year 2020 at Sealab, an underwater research base on the Challenger seamount. Commanded by Captain Michael Murphy, Sealab was home to 250 people, and was dedicated to the exploration of the seas and the protection of marine life. Dr. Paul Williams, a Chinook oceanographer, led the scientific research team.

Among other things, the crew of Sealab faced such challenges as attacks from sharks and giant squids, potential environmental disasters, and threats to Sealab and marine life from shipping.

== Cast ==
- John Stephenson as Captain Michael "Mike" Murphy, Quincy Jones
- Ross Martin as Paul Williams
- Jerry Dexter as Hal Bryant
- Ann Jillian as Gail Adams
- Ron Pinkard as Ed Thomas, Mrs. Thomas's son
- William Callaway as Lieutenant Sparks
- Josh Albee as Bobby Murphy
- Pamelyn Ferdin as Sally
- Gary Shapiro as Jamie Thomas
- Olga James as Mrs. Thomas, Ed Thomas's mother
- Mike Road as Matthew Mills
- Casey Kasem as Craig Bracken
- Don Messick as Lawrence Cummings

== Episodes ==
No.	Title	Original release date
1	"Deep Threat"	September 9, 1972
Radiation is released into the water by some leaking barrels. Meanwhile, the captain's grandson and his friend Sally get lost while diving.
2	"Lost"	September 16, 1972
A red tide engulfs Sealab, cutting down its oxygen supply. Meanwhile, Gail becomes attached to a lost, young dolphin she has found and tries to train it to rescue divers.
3	"Green Fever"	September 23, 1972
An anchor hits the Sealab, causing one of the compartments to flood.
4	"The Singing Whale"	September 30, 1972
A whale expert and his wheelchair user son visit Sealab just as a blue whale and the obsessed hunter chasing it come to the seamount.
5	"The Shark Lover"	October 7, 1972
When the level of shark activity skyrockets around Sealab, they call in a shark expert to try to learn the cause and ensure safety for the oceanauts.
6	"The Basking Shark"	October 14, 1972
A probe sent to study the planet Neptune's atmosphere returns to earth after 12 years but on reentry the parachute fails and it crash-lands in the ocean near Sealab. Mr. Mills from the Aerospace Bureau enlists the help of Sealab to help recover the probe within 48 hours. An anomalous malfunction with the sonar system and perceived sudden disappearance of the probe lead Aerospace to suspect Sealab sonagrapher Henry Lucas of espionage. The probe turns up in an unusual place and is retrieved in an even more unusual way.
7	"Where Dangers Are Many"	October 21, 1972
Sealab crew investigates a disturbance to find an automatic bottom-dredging mining operation in their area. The captain of the operation, Samuel Carlson, becomes trapped under his dredge and is rescued by Sealab. While Carlson is decompressing after having received medical attention at Sealab, the crew manage to convince him to allow them 24 hours to demonstrate how to mine less destructively.
8	"Backfire"	October 28, 1972
Sealab members are out trying to capture an electric manta ray when they see some strange figures whom they determine to be drilling for oil, with Sealab's permission but without the crew's knowledge. They try to get the men to relocate the oil drilling to another field miles away from Sealab but the drillers refuse. Then a tsunami hits and their oil drilling operation is destroyed. The episode is called Backfire because if they had moved the drilling operation they would have averted disaster.
9	"The Deepest Dive"	November 4, 1972
The crew of Sealab are testing a new submersible vehicle called the "Crystal Ball", which is made out of mostly glass and is supposed to be better than conventional submersibles and dive deeper. They are given a mission to place a seismograph unit at the bottom of a deep part of the sea, but for some reason the unit stops functioning. They go back out with a second replacement seismograph unit and realize that a giant squid had taken the first unit and used it for material for its rock home. The squid catches the Crystal Ball and the crew is stuck trying to escape from its grasp. They eventually get free and the new seismograph unit works.
10	"The Challenge"	November 11, 1972
The Sealab team meet Alex, an archaeologist who has dedicated the last 7 years to finding the sunken ship Viking, which sank over 100 years ago. It is rumored that the ship was carrying some Aztec treasures. Alex's brother Chuck is excited by the discovery, and his excitement is interfering. Sealab follows rules and guidelines that guarantee safety, but prevent Chuck from finding the treasure faster. Alex is willing to cut his losses if lives could be lost, but Chuck will not let the last seven years of his brother's life be for nothing.
11	"Collision of the Aquarius"	November 18, 1972
A malfunctioning cargo submarine crashes into the side of the Seamount and its damaged nuclear reactor threatens Sealab, forcing an evacuation. The oceanauts race against time to prevent the submarine's reactor from melting down, but complicating the situation is its commander, who has an acrimonious history with Captain Murphy. NOTE: This episode was remade in 2002 with the voice actors of the comedy series Sealab 2021, and retitled as "7211."
12	"The Capture"	November 25, 1972
The Sealab crew reluctantly assists biologist Mr. Harlem in collecting animal species living on the Challenger Seamount. Two of the children are upset by this and secretly release the captive animals. In the process, the children become trapped in the cage and are dragged over the edge of the seamount.
13	"The Arctic Story"	December 2, 1972
Members of the crew use the submarine Dolphin in a desperate search for a two-man Arctic research station which is underneath a capsized ice floe.

== Production ==
Sealab 2020 marked Hanna-Barbera's first return to the action-adventure genre since increased political and social pressures saw that by 1972, most action programming had been removed from the Saturday-morning slot, following pressure from parents' lobbying groups such as the Action for Children's Television (ACT). The series took a more somber and serious approach in comparison to its prior action focused animated series taking tonal inspiration from Star Trek and focusing less on defeating villains of the week with fisticuffs, and instead focusing on its characters responding to environmental or oceanographic crises and concerns. Alex Toth, who had provided work on prior Hanna-Barbera series such as Space Ghost, returned to the studio and designed all aspects of the series including vehicle and character designs. While Toth enjoyed the creative and artistic freedom granted to him in developing and designing the show, he felt the frugal animation Hanna-Barbera was known for hampered the ability to portray a convincing underwater environment. Pamelyn Ferdin, who voiced Sally in the series, praised the series as being ahead of its time when it came to discussing issues such as commercial fishing, oil spills, handling of radioactive waste, and other human activities which contribute to environmental degradation.

== Broadcast ==
Sealab 2020 premiered on Saturday September 9, 1972 on NBC during the 11:00-11:30AM timeslot. As NBC's orders were characterized by 13 episode batches to run 4 times over the year in order to cover the 52 week television schedule, the series ran on NBC until September 1, 1973 at which point it was dropped from the 1973–74 Saturday morning schedule.

The series was rebroadcast on Cartoon Network from December 6, 1992 to March 14, 1993 as part of Cartoon Network's Boomerang programming block dedicated to showcases of older cartoons.

== Merchandise ==
In 1973, a board game based on the show was produced by Milton Bradley.

== Parody follow-up ==
Sealab 2020 was parodied by the Cartoon Network/Adult Swim show Sealab 2021, which aired from December 21, 2000 to April 24, 2005.

== Home media ==
On May 22, 2012, Warner Archive released Sealab 2020: The Complete Series on DVD in region 1 as part of their Hanna-Barbera Classic Collection. This is a manufacture-on-demand (MOD) release, available exclusively through Warner's online store and Amazon.com.

The pilot episode "Deep Threat" is included in the Warner Bros. Saturday Morning Cartoons: 1970s Vol. 2 DVD set.

=== Print media ===
The fanzine Lancelot Link Fan World, published by Cornell Kimball, often covered Sealab 2020.

== See also ==
- List of underwater science fiction works
