= Sealab 2021 =

American adult animated television series

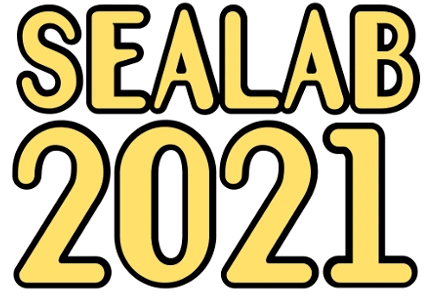
- Genre: Adult animation; Comic science fiction; Surreal humor; Parody; Satire
- Created by: Adam Reed; Matt Thompson
- Based on: Sealab 2020 by Alex Toth; William Hanna and Joseph Barbera
- Voices of: Harry Goz (2000–03); Michael Goz (2003–05); Kate Miller; Erik Estrada; Brett Butler; Ellis Henican; Bill Lobley; MC Chris
- Theme music composer: Julie Stepanek
- Opening theme: "Sealab" performed by Calamine
- Country of origin: United States
- Original language: English
- No. of seasons: 4
- No. of episodes: 52 (and 1 unaired pilot) (list of episodes)

Production
- Executive producers: Adam Reed; Matt Thompson; Mike Lazzo (Note: Executive Producers for Cartoon Network (seasons 1–3), Williams Street (season 4).); Keith Crofford
- Producers: Adam Reed; Matt Thompson
- Running time: 12 minutes
- Production companies: Williams Street; 70/30 Productions

Original release
- Network: Cartoon Network
- Release: December 21 – December 30, 2000
- Network: Adult Swim
- Release: September 2, 2001 – April 24, 2005

Related
- Sealab 2020; Archer

Sealab 2021 is an American adult animated science fiction comedy television series created by Adam Reed and Matt Thompson for Cartoon Network's late-night programming block Adult Swim. Cartoon Network aired the show's first three episodes in December 2000 before the official inception of the Adult Swim block on September 2, 2001, with the final episode airing on April 24, 2005. It is one of the only four original Williams Street series that premiered in 2000 before Adult Swim officially launched, with the others being Aqua Teen Hunger Force, The Brak Show, and Harvey Birdman, Attorney at Law.

Much like Adult Swim's Space Ghost Coast to Coast, the animation used stock footage from Hanna-Barbera's short-lived, environmentally themed animated series Sealab 2020, along with original animation; Hanna-Barbera was not involved in the production. The show was a satirical parody of both the original Sealab series and the general conventions of the 1970s animated children's series. While there was initial resistance from several of the original series' creators to the reuse of their characters, production moved forward on the series.

Sealab 2021 received positive reviews from critics for its surreal humor and is considered to be superior to its predecessor. It serves as a stylistic predecessor to Frisky Dingo and Floyd County Productions series; characters from Sealab 2021 appeared in FX's Archer series.

== Episodes ==
Season	Episodes	Originally released	
Season	Episodes	First released	Last released
Pilot		Unaired	
1	13	December 21, 2000	May 5, 2002
2	13	May 12, 2002	November 16, 2003
3	13	November 23, 2003	July 18, 2004
4	13	November 14, 2004	April 24, 2005

== Production ==
Adam Reed and Matt Thompson, the creators and writers of Sealab 2021, came up with the idea for the show in 1995 while they were production assistants for Cartoon Network. They stumbled on a tape of the show Sealab 2020, and wrote replacement dialogue. Cartoon Network passed on the show because it did not believe it was funny. Five years after quitting Cartoon Network, the two went back to the original tape, this time making the characters do what they wanted. Cartoon Network bought the show, coincidentally around the same time that Adult Swim was created. The original "pitch pilot" is available on the Season 1 DVD as a special feature. The series was produced at 70/30 Productions, a studio founded by Reed and Thompson located at Atlanta.

Very few of the episodes of the series share any continuity or ongoing plot. For instance, the entire installation is destroyed at the end of many episodes, and crew members are often killed in various ways, only to return in the following episode. There are occasional running gags, such as the "Grizzlebee's" restaurant chain, a parody of Applebee's and Bennigan's, the character of Sharko, and Prescott, the half-man, half-tentacle monster "from the network". It contains many references to the pop culture of the 1980s–2000s and makes use of other cartoons from the 1970s besides that on which it is based, such as 1973's Butch Cassidy for the on-screen appearances of the Sealab writers, and various one-off appearances of other characters.

== Characters ==
- Captain Hazel "Hank" Murphy (voiced by Harry Goz) is the ostensible leader of the crew, though his qualifications, and even his grasp on reality, are questionable. He is generally found loitering on the bridge, neglecting his duties. Murphy spends his time participating in scams and juvenile antics, generally causing problems that the crew has to solve. Murphy is a parody of Captain Mike Murphy from Sealab 2020. Generally, Murphy is incapable to the point of incompetence. After the death of Harry Goz, Murphy was written out of the show by having him leave Sealab to fight in the "Great Spice Wars". Murphy later appeared in the Reed and Thompson-created series Archer, where he was voiced by Jon Hamm and debuted in the two-part episode "Sea Tunt".
- Captain Bellerophon "Tornado" Shanks (voiced by Michael Goz) is a retired football coach and health and hygiene teacher who lost his job for slapping (or throat punching) a student. He answered Sealab's help wanted ad and became the new captain, despite having no experience whatsoever. Shanks is from Texas and is the youngest of several brothers all named after characters in Greek mythology, and all of whom met their death on or around a bridge in Shanks's hometown. Shanks is much more self-aware than Murphy, openly commenting on the odd goings-on aboard Sealab and even the fact that he is on a television program. Since Shanks has no experience or idea what he is doing, he goes along with whatever the rest of the crew suggests, usually with disastrous results.
- Lieutenant Jodene Sparks (voiced by Bill Lobley) is a commander and radio operator who is always seen sitting with his headsets on. Sparks is a parody of Lieutenant Sparks from Sealab 2020. Sparks mostly uses the radio for his own personal purposes, even going so far as to disconnect vital transmissions that interrupt him. He generally travels around in his office chair, mostly because he is lazy, even though it was suggested that he is crippled. Sparks is a convict serving time at Sealab while still operating a black market distillery and takes part in a wide variety of other illegal activities. He occasionally serves as a voice of reason to the crew, particularly to Murphy.
- Debbie "White Debbie" DuPree (voiced by Kate Miller) is a lieutenant commander, marine biologist, and one of only two adult women on the base. Serving as a parody of Gail from Sealab 2020, she is a blonde and is often the object of the sexual interest of the males on Sealab. She has an ongoing sexual relationship with Doctor Quinn, and their relationship, its ups and downs, and its effect on the rest of the crew play out in several stories. This does not stop the other males, particularly Stormy, from attempting to get on her good side. Debbie's mood swings are a constant issue to the crew, as she changes wildly from the sole voice of reason to a shrieking lunatic.
- Derek "Stormy" Waters (voiced by Ellis Henican) is a lieutenant commander lacking in intelligence or seemingly any qualifications to be working on a government research lab, and a parody of Hal from Sealab 2020. Stormy's job is never clearly defined and he usually walks around Sealab doing whatever he wants or acts as a henchman or assistant to whomever he is nearest. Stormy usually works alongside Quinn, who is frequently the victim of Stormy's ignorance, but ironically is the crew member who's most tolerant of him.
- Dr. Quentin Q. Quinn (voiced by Brett Butler) is a lieutenant commander and science officer. Parodying Ed from Sealab 2020, he is an extremely intelligent African-American with an IQ of 260 and Ph.D.s in several scientific disciplines, of which he is not shy about reminding the other characters. Quinn grew up in unbelievably over-the-top poverty and got to where he is through hard work, unlike the majority of the other characters. He is regarded as an uptight killjoy by most of the crew. Quinn is often the only responsible crew member and the sole voice of reason. Despite his intelligence, Quinn is extremely vain and prone to outbursts of anger when he is not appreciated.
- Marco Rodrigo Diaz de Vivar Gabriel Garcia Marquez (voiced by Erik Estrada) is a lieutenant commander and engineer. Spoofing Dr. Paul Williams from Sealab 2020, he is very strong and muscular, unlike the rest of the crew. He speaks with a Spanish accent and often exclaims random things in Spanish, although not actually speaking the language. His name is derived from literary character Rodrigo Díaz de Vivar and writer Gabriel García Márquez.
- Hesh Hepplewhite (voiced by MC Chris) is a lieutenant and reactor operator. Nasal-voiced, smart-mouthed, and whiny, Hesh is not well-liked by most of the crew and thus works in the part of the station farthest away from them. He has no real understanding of how the reactor works and generally has to have guidance from Quinn when there is a problem.
- Debbie "Black Debbie" Allison Love (voiced by Angela Gibbs) is an African-American lieutenant who is a parody of the Sealab 2020 character Mrs. Thomas (Ed Thomas's mother). She teaches school to the Sealab's orphans and is very proud of her race. She has a relationship with Marco at the beginning of the show and briefly dates Sparks and Tornado in the later seasons.
- Dr. Ilad Virjay (voiced by Adam Reed) is the station's official doctor and in-house surgeon noted for his thick Indian accent and relatively normal personality. He graduated third in his class from the Medical College of Mescutabuti. He practices Manduism, the Sealab universe's version of Hinduism. Virjay is shown to be jealous of Dr. Quinn as the latter has multiple Ph.Ds and a higher IQ.
- Dolphin Boy is a little chubby boy who speaks in dolphin noises. One of the orphans that inhabit Sealab for some reason, he is a member of Black Debbie's class. Dolphin Boy often wanders around the station and, as a result, is often embroiled in whatever is going on. When translated, Dolphin Boy generally says inoffensive, naively childish statements, universally resulting in derision and hatred from the rest of the crew.
- Sharko (voiced by Matt Thompson) is a half-human, half-shark freak of nature who is the result of Marco having sexual relations with a shark.
- The Five Jew Bankers are a lampoon of Jewish conspiracy theories. They are introduced in the third-season episode "Neptunati".

== International broadcast ==
In Canada, Sealab 2021 aired on the local version of Adult Swim. It previously aired on the former Teletoon at Night program block on Teletoon in English Canada.

== Home media and streaming ==
The series has been available on HBO Max since September 1, 2020.

DVD Name	Release Date	Episodes	Additional Information
Season One	July 20, 2004	13	This two-disc boxset contains the first 13 episodes ("Radio Free Sealab" through "Swimming in Oblivion"). Bonus features include alternate endings for the episode "I, Robot", deleted scenes, the original pitch pilot, and uncensored scenes for "Radio Free Sealab". Music during the main menu is the original recording of the theme song.
Season Two	February 1, 2005	13	This two-disc boxset contains the second set of 13 episodes ("Der Dieb" through "Return to Oblivion"). Bonus features include commentaries for all thirteen episodes, an animatic for the unseen episode "Ronnie", and other assorted bonus features – many of which involve women in bikinis. The DVD cover, used for the "Bizarro" episode, is a homage to the cover of Uncanny X-Men #100, by artist Dave Cockrum. Music during the main menu is the theme song played backwards. This season two DVD is included on Adult Swim in a Box, which was released on October 27, 2009.
Season Three	July 12, 2005	13	This two-disc boxset contains the third set of 13 episodes ("Splitsville" through "Neptunati"). Bonus features include two unseen episodes and the animatic of a third unseen episode, commentary for four episodes, and other features. Music during the main menu is the music used in the "Red Dawn" episode.
Season Four	August 8, 2006	13	This two-disc boxset contains the final 13 episodes ("Isla de las Chupacabras" through "Legacy of Laughter"). Bonus features include alternate endings and deleted scenes. For this release, Cartoon Network abandoned their usual digipak packaging design in favor of a more traditional Amaray style keep case. During the main menu, underwater sound effects are used.

== Reception ==
In January 2009, IGN listed Sealab 2021 as the 79th best in the "Top 100 Animated Series". In 2013 IGN placed Sealab 2021 as number 22 on their list of top 25 animated series for adults.

Paul Di Filippo of the website Sci Fi Weekly, in his review of the Season 3 DVD, felt that general fan opinion of the show declined sharply following the death of Harry Goz (the voice of Captain Hazel Murphy) during Season 3.

In 2021, upon the 20-year anniversary of Adult Swim, Nerdist stated of the series, "It's one thing to imagine Sealab 2021. It's another getting it on the airwaves." Boston's Rock 92.9 published an article calling it "Another masterful reworking of old cartoon footage."

== See also ==
- List of underwater science fiction works
