= Annie Award for Outstanding Achievement for Voice Acting in an Animated Television/Broadcast Production =

Annual television award

Annie Award for Voice Acting in an Animated Television/Broadcasting Production
- Awarded for: Excellence in voice acting for animated television/broadcasting productions
- Country: United States
- Presented by: ASIFA-Hollywood
- First award: 1997
- Currently held by: Dan Mintz – Bob's Burgers (2025)
- Website: annieawards.org

The Annie Award for Voice Acting in an Animated Television/Broadcasting Production is an Annie Award given annually to the best voice acting in an animated television or broadcasting production. The category has gone through some name changes and divisions:

- From 1994 to 1996, the Best Achievement in Voice Acting award was presented to recognize voice acting for both film and television productions.
- In 1997, two categories were created for voice acting in television productions divided by the gender of the performer, resulting in Outstanding Individual Achievement for Voice Acting by a Female Performer in an Animated Television Production and Outstanding Individual Achievement for Voice Acting by a Male Performer in an Animated Television Production, these categories were presented until 2001, with the exception of 1999 where a gender-neutral category was presented.

Since 2002, the gender-neutral category Outstanding Achievement for Voice Acting in a Television Production is presented, later being renamed to also include broadcasting productions alongside television ones.

== Winners and nominees ==
=== 1990s ===
Best Achievement in Voice Acting

Year	Recipient	Character(s)	Film/Program
1994 (22nd)
1994 (22nd)	Jeremy Irons	Scar	The Lion King
1994 (22nd)	Gregg Berger	Cornfed Pig	Duckman
1994 (22nd)	Mark Hamill	Joker	Batman: The Animated Series
1994 (22nd)	Frank Welker	Various characters	Animaniacs
1994 (22nd)	Billy West	Stimpy	The Ren & Stimpy Show
1995 (23rd)
1995 (23rd)	Nancy Cartwright	Bart Simpson	The Simpsons
1995 (23rd)	Jeff Bennett	Johnny Bravo	Johnny Bravo
1995 (23rd)	Jim Cummings	Mr. Bumpy	Bump in the Night
1995 (23rd)	Tress MacNeille	Dot Warner	Animaniacs
1995 (23rd)	Rob Paulsen	Yakko Warner	Animaniacs
1996 (24th)
1996 (24th)	Rob Paulsen	Pinky	Pinky and the Brain
1996 (24th)	Sean Connery	Draco	Dragonheart
1996 (24th)	Richard Dreyfuss	Mr. Centipede	James and the Giant Peach
1996 (24th)	Jonathan Frakes	David Xanatos	Gargoyles
1996 (24th)	Tom Hanks	Sheriff Woody	Toy Story
1996 (24th)	Tom Hulce	Quasimodo	The Hunchback of Notre Dame
1996 (24th)	Tony Jay	Judge Claude Frollo	The Hunchback of Notre Dame
1996 (24th)	Demi Moore	Esmeralda	The Hunchback of Notre Dame

Outstanding Individual Achievement for Voice Acting in an Animated Feature Production

Year	Recipient	Character(s)	Program	Episode	Network
1997 (25th)
1997 (25th)	Best Individual Achievement: Voice Acting by a Female Performer				
1997 (25th)	June Foray	Granny	The Sylvester & Tweety Mysteries		Kids' WB
1997 (25th)	Christine Cavanaugh	Dexter	Dexter's Laboratory		Cartoon Network
1997 (25th)	Tress MacNeille	Debbie Douglas	Freakazoid!	"Mission Freakazoid"	Kids' WB
1997 (25th)	Brittany Murphy	Luanne	King of the Hill		Fox
1997 (25th)	Maggie Roswell	Sharry Bobbins	The Simpsons	"Simpsoncalifragilisticexpiala (Annoyed Grunt)cious"	Fox
1997 (25th)	Best Individual Achievement: Voice Acting by a Male Performer				
1997 (25th)	Rob Paulsen	Pinky	Pinky and the Brain		Kids' WB
1997 (25th)	Jeff Bennett	Johnny Bravo	Johnny Bravo		Cartoon Network
1997 (25th)	Phil Hayes	Tumbleweed Tex	Tumbleweed Tex	"School Daze"	Cartoon Network
1997 (25th)	Mike Judge	Hank Hill	King of the Hill		Fox
1997 (25th)	Townsend Coleman	The Tick	The Tick		Fox
1998 (26th)
1998 (26th)	Outstanding Individual Achievement for Voice Acting by a Female Performer in an Animated Television Production				
1998 (26th)	June Foray	Granny	The Sylvester & Tweety Mysteries		Kids' WB
1998 (26th)	Christine Cavanaugh	Dexter	Dexter's Laboratory		Cartoon Network
1998 (26th)	Kathy Najimy	Peggy Hill	King of the Hill		Fox
1998 (26th)	Bebe Neuwirth	"Belladonna"	All Dogs Go to Heaven		MGM Animation
1998 (26th)	April Winchell	Cruella de Vil	101 Dalmatians: The Series		ABC
1998 (26th)	Outstanding Individual Achievement for Voice Acting by a Male Performer in an Animated Television Production				
1998 (26th)	Maurice LaMarche	The Brain	Pinky and the Brain		Kids' WB
1998 (26th)	Nandor Nevai	Delivery Man	KaBlam!: Sniz & Fondue		Nickelodeon
1998 (26th)	Rob Paulsen	Pinky	Pinky and the Brain		Kids' WB
1998 (26th)	David Warner	Doctor Vic Frankenstein	Toonsylvania		Fox Kids
1998 (26th)	Robin Williams	Genie	Genie's Great Minds		ABC
1999 (27th)
1999 (27th)	Outstanding Individual Achievement for Voice Acting in an Animated Television Production				
1999 (27th)	Rob Paulsen	Pinky	Pinky, Elmyra & the Brain		Kids' WB
1999 (27th)	Charlie Adler	Cow	Cow and Chicken		Cartoon Network
1999 (27th)	Tara Charendoff	Bubbles	The Powerpuff Girls		Cartoon Network
1999 (27th)	Eddie Murphy	Thurgood Stubbs	The PJs		Fox
1999 (27th)	Cree Summer	Elmyra	Pinky, Elmyra & the Brain		Kids' WB

=== 2000s ===
Year	Recipient	Character(s)	Program	Episode	Network
2000 (28th)
2000 (28th)	Outstanding Individual Achievement for Voice Acting by a Female Performer in an Animated Television Production				
2000 (28th)	Christine Cavanaugh	Dexter	Dexter's Laboratory: Ego Trip		Cartoon Network
2000 (28th)	Brittany Murphy	Luanne Platter	King of the Hill	"Movin on Up"	Fox
2000 (28th)	Kathleen Barr	Wheezie	Dragon Tales		PBS Kids
2000 (28th)	Tress MacNeille	The World's Oldest Woman	Histeria!	"Euro-Mania"	Kids' WB
2000 (28th)	April Winchell	Ms. Finster	Recess	"A Great State Affair"	UPN
2000 (28th)	Outstanding Individual Achievement for Voice Acting by a Male Performer in an Animated Television Production				
2000 (28th)	Dan Castellaneta	The Postman	Olive, the Other Reindeer		Fox
2000 (28th)	David Warner	Ra's al Ghul	The New Batman/Superman Adventures		Kids' WB
2000 (28th)	Mike Judge	Hank Hill	King of the Hill	"Hanky Panky"	Fox
2000 (28th)	Jason Michas	Zak	Dragon Tales		PBS Kids
2001 (29th)
2001 (29th)	Outstanding Individual Achievement for Voice Acting by a Female Performer in an Animated Television Production				
2001 (29th)	Kathy Najimy	Peggy Hill	King of the Hill	"Luanne, Virgin 2.02"	Fox
2001 (29th)	Pam Segall Adlon	Otto Osworth	Time Squad	"Eli Whitney's Flesh-Eating Mistake"	Cartoon Network
2001 (29th)	Mary Jo Catlett	Mrs. Puff	SpongeBob SquarePants	"No Free Rides"	Nickelodeon
2001 (29th)	Tara Strong	Timmy Turner	The Fairly OddParents		Nickelodeon
2001 (29th)	Olivia Hussey	Talia al Ghul	Batman Beyond	"Out of the Past"	Kids' WB
2001 (29th)	Outstanding Individual Achievement for Voice Acting by a Male Performer in an Animated Television Production				
2001 (29th)	John DiMaggio	Bender	Futurama	"Bendless Love"	Fox
2001 (29th)	Kevin Conroy	Bruce Wayne	Batman Beyond	"Out of the Past"	Kids' WB
2001 (29th)	Richard Horvitz	Zim	Invader Zim		Nickelodeon
2001 (29th)	Tom Kenny	SpongeBob SquarePants	SpongeBob SquarePants	"Wormy"	Nickelodeon
2001 (29th)	David Ogden Stiers	Mr. Jolly	Teacher's Pet	"Pet Project"	ABC

Outstanding Achievement for Voice Acting in a Television Production

Year	Recipient	Character(s)	Program	Episode	Network
2002 (30th)
2002 (30th)	Corey Burton	Ludwig Von Drake	House of Mouse		ABC
2002 (30th)	Mike MacDonald	Rip	The Ripping Friends		Fox Kids
2003 (31st)
2003 (31st)	Jeff Garcia	Sheen Estevez	The Adventures of Jimmy Neutron, Boy Genius	"Nightmare in Retroville"	Nickelodeon
2003 (31st)	Bob Bergen	Eager Young Space Cadet	Duck Dodgers		Cartoon Network
2003 (31st)	Janice Kawaye	Jenny	My Life as a Teenage Robot		Nickelodeon
2003 (31st)	Candi Milo	Mrs. Wakeman	My Life as a Teenage Robot		Nickelodeon
2003 (31st)	Tara Strong	Dannon O'Mallard	Jakers! The Adventures of Piggley Winks		PBS Kids
2004 (32nd)
2004 (32nd)	Brittany Murphy	Luanne Platter	King of the Hill	"Girl, You'll Be a Giant Soon"	Fox
2004 (32nd)	Maile Flanagan	Piggley	Jakers! The Adventures of Piggley Winks		PBS Kids
2004 (32nd)	Russi Taylor	Ferny	Jakers! The Adventures of Piggley Winks		PBS Kids
2004 (32nd)	Carolyn Lawrence	Cindy Vortex	The Adventures of Jimmy Neutron, Boy Genius		Nickelodeon
2004 (32nd)	Candi Milo	Mrs. Wakeman	My Life as a Teenage Robot		Nickelodeon
2005 (33rd)
2005 (33rd)	Seth MacFarlane	Stewie Griffin	Family Guy	"Brian the Bachelor"	Fox
2005 (33rd)	Grey DeLisle	Kitty	Danger Rangers	"Fires & Liars"	PBS Kids
2005 (33rd)	Johnny Hardwick	Dale Gribble	King of the Hill	"Smoking and the Bandit"	Fox
2005 (33rd)	Tony Jay	Spiderus	Miss Spider's Sunny Patch Friends	"A Froggy Day in Sunny Patch"	Teletoon/ Treehouse TV
2005 (33rd)	Rob Paulsen	Eubie	The Happy Elf		NBC
2006 (34th)
2006 (34th)	Eartha Kitt	Yzma	The Emperor's New School	"Kuzclone"	Disney Channel
2006 (34th)	Keith Ferguson	Blooregard	Foster's Home for Imaginary Friends	"Squeeze the Day"	Cartoon Network
2006 (34th)	Mila Kunis	Meg Griffin	Family Guy	"Barely Legal"	Fox
2006 (34th)	Russi Taylor	Ferny	Jakers! The Adventures of Piggley Winks	"Mi Galeon"	PBS Kids
2006 (34th)	Patrick Warburton	Kronk	The Emperor's New School	"Kuzclone"	Disney Channel
2007 (35th)
2007 (35th)	Eartha Kitt	Yzma	The Emperor's New School	"Emperor's New Musical"	Disney Channel
2007 (35th)	Scott Adsit	Clay Puppington	Moral Orel		Adult Swim
2007 (35th)	Madison Davenport	Sophianna	Christmas Is Here Again		Screen Media Films
2007 (35th)	Tom Kenny	SpongeBob SquarePants	SpongeBob SquarePants	"Spy Buddies"	Nickelodeon
2007 (35th)	Eddie Murphy	Donkey	Shrek The Halls		ABC
2008 (36th)
2008 (36th)	Ahmed Best	Jar Jar Binks	Robot Chicken: Star Wars Episode II		Adult Swim
2008 (36th)	Seth MacFarlane	Peter Griffin	Family Guy	"I Dream of Jesus"	Fox
2008 (36th)	Dwight Schultz	Mung Daal	Chowder	"Apprentice Games"	Cartoon Network
2009 (37th)
2009 (37th)	Tom Kenny	SpongeBob SquarePants	SpongeBob SquarePants	"Truth or Square"	Nickelodeon
2009 (37th)	Danny Jacobs	King Julien	Merry Madagascar		NBC
2009 (37th)	Willow Smith	Abby	Merry Madagascar		NBC
2009 (37th)	Nicky Jones	Chowder	Chowder	"The Dinner Theatre"	Cartoon Network
2009 (37th)	Dwight Schultz	Mung Daal	Chowder	"The Party Cruise"	Cartoon Network

=== 2010s ===
Year	Recipient	Character(s)	Program	Episode	Network
2010 (38th)
2010 (38th)	James Hong	Mr. Ping	Kung Fu Panda Holiday		NBC
2010 (38th)	Jeff Bennett	The Necronomicon	Fanboy & Chum Chum		Nickelodeon
2010 (38th)	Corey Burton	Baron Papanoida	Star Wars: The Clone Wars		Cartoon Network
2010 (38th)	Nika Futterman	Asajj Ventress	Star Wars: The Clone Wars		Cartoon Network
2010 (38th)	Mike Henry	Cleveland Brown	The Cleveland Show		Fox
2011 (39th)
2011 (39th)	Jeff Bennett	Kowalski	The Penguins of Madagascar		Nickelodeon
2011 (39th)	Dan Harmon	Jekyll	Mary Shelley's Frankenhole	"Season 2"	Adult Swim
2011 (39th)	Jeff B. Davis	Victor Frankenstein	Mary Shelley's Frankenhole	"Season 2"	Adult Swim
2011 (39th)	Scott Adsit	The Creature	Mary Shelley's Frankenhole	"Season 2"	Adult Swim
2011 (39th)	Carlos Alazraqui	Denzel Crocker	The Fairly OddParents		Nickelodeon
2011 (39th)	Daran Norris	Cosmo	The Fairly OddParents		Nickelodeon
2011 (39th)	Dee Bradley Baker	Clone Troopers	Star Wars: The Clone Wars		Cartoon Network
2011 (39th)	Nika Futterman	Asajj Ventress	Star Wars: The Clone Wars		Cartoon Network
2011 (39th)	Diedrich Bader	Batman	Batman: The Brave and the Bold		Cartoon Network
2011 (39th)	Logan Grove	Gumball	The Amazing World of Gumball		Cartoon Network
2011 (39th)	H. Jon Benjamin	Sterling Archer	Archer		FX
2011 (39th)	Jessica Walter	Malory Archer	Archer		FX
2011 (39th)	Judy Greer	Cheryl Tunt	Archer		FX
2011 (39th)	Tara Strong	Timmy Turner	The Fairly OddParents	"Operation: Dinkleberg"	Nickelodeon
2012 (40th)
2012 (40th)	Kristen Schaal	Mabel Pines	Gravity Falls	"Tourist Trapped"	Disney Channel
2012 (40th)	James Patrick Stuart	Private	The Penguins of Madagascar	"High Moltage"	Nickelodeon
2012 (40th)	Tom McGrath	Skipper	The Penguins of Madagascar	"The Otter Woman"	Nickelodeon
2012 (40th)	Jeff Bennett	Keswick	T.U.F.F. Puppy	"Pup Daddy"	Nickelodeon
2012 (40th)	Mae Whitman	April O'Neil	Teenage Mutant Ninja Turtles	"Rise of the Turtles"	Nickelodeon
2012 (40th)	Sam Witwer	Darth Maul	Star Wars: The Clone Wars	"Revenge"	Cartoon Network
2012 (40th)	Jessica Walter	Malory Archer	Archer	"Lo Scandolo"	FX
2012 (40th)	Kevin Michael Richardson	Willem Viceroy	Randy Cunningham: 9th Grade Ninja	"Gossip Boy"	Disney XD
2013 (41st)
2013 (41st)	Tom Kenny	Ice King	Adventure Time		Cartoon Network
2013 (41st)	Chris Diamantopoulos	Mickey Mouse	Mickey Mouse		Disney Channel
2013 (41st)	Bill Farmer	Goofy	Mickey Mouse		Disney Channel
2013 (41st)	Eric Bauza	Foop	The Fairly OddParents		Nickelodeon
2013 (41st)	Mark Hamill	Skips	Regular Show		Cartoon Network
2014 (42nd)
2014 (42nd)	Bill Farmer	Goofy, Grandma	Mickey Mouse		Disney Channel
2014 (42nd)	Carlos Alazraqui	Crocker	The Fairly OddParents		Nickelodeon
2014 (42nd)	Seth Green	Robot Chicken Nerd	Robot Chicken		Adult Swim
2015 (43rd)
2015 (43rd)	Kristen Schaal	Louise Belcher	Bob's Burgers	"Hawk & Chick"	Fox
2015 (43rd)	Laraine Newman	Amber	Dawn of the Croods	"The First Picture Show", "MomGenes"	Netflix
2015 (43rd)	Grey Griffin	Lerk	Dawn of the Croods	"The First Picture Show", "School of Hard Rocks"	Netflix
2015 (43rd)	Eric Bauza	Puss in Boots	The Adventures of Puss in Boots		Netflix
2015 (43rd)	Eric Bauza	Buhdeuce	Breadwinners	"Movie Ducks"	Nickelodeon
2015 (43rd)	Matt Jones	Pig	Pig Goat Banana Cricket	"Underpants-Palooza"	Nickelodeon
2015 (43rd)	Alan Tudyk	Ludo	Star vs. the Forces of Evil		Disney Channel/ Disney XD
2015 (43rd)	Kevin Michael Richardson	Mr. Gus	Uncle Grandpa	"Uncle Grandpa at the Movies"	Cartoon Network
2016 (44th)
2016 (44th)	Carlos Alazraqui	Ponce de León	The Mr. Peabody & Sherman Show	"Ponce de León"	Netflix
2016 (44th)	Will Townsend	Mr. Weenie	Open Season: Scared Silly		Sony Pictures Animation
2016 (44th)	Leslie Carrara-Rudolph	Bubbles	Splash and Bubbles	"I Only Have Eyespots for You/Double Bubbles"	PBS Kids
2016 (44th)	Alison Brie	Diane Nguyen	BoJack Horseman		Netflix
2016 (44th)	Lars Mikkelsen	Grand Admiral Thrawn	Star Wars Rebels	"Hera's Heroes"	Disney XD
2017 (45th)
2017 (45th)	Tom Kenny	SpongeBob SquarePants	SpongeBob SquarePants		Nickelodeon
2017 (45th)	Wendie Malick	Beatrice Horseman	BoJack Horseman	"Time's Arrow"	Netflix
2017 (45th)	Jeremy Rowley	Bunsen	Bunsen Is a Beast		Nickelodeon
2017 (45th)	Chris Diamantopoulos	Mickey Mouse	Mickey Mouse	"The Scariest Story Ever: A Mickey Mouse Halloween Spooktacular!"	Disney Channel
2017 (45th)	Nicolas Cantu	Gumball	The Amazing World of Gumball	"The Grades"	Cartoon Network
2018 (46th)
2018 (46th)	Will Arnett	BoJack Horseman	BoJack Horseman	"Free Churro"	Netflix
2018 (46th)	Juliet Donenfeld	Sally Squirrel	Pete the Cat	"Magic Sunglasses & Sandcastles"	Prime Video
2018 (46th)	Debi Derryberry	Maureen Murphy, Bridget, Phillip, Nurse Beatrice, Scott, Ken	F Is for Family		Netflix
2018 (46th)	Patrick Warburton	Captain Flynn	Skylanders Academy	"Raiders of the Lost Arkus, Part 1"	Netflix
2018 (46th)	Tara Strong	Unikitty	Unikitty!	"Scary Tales", "Tasty Heist", "Unikitty News", "Hide N Seek", "Kitty Court"	Cartoon Network
2019 (47th)
2019 (47th)	H. Jon Benjamin	Bob Belcher	Bob's Burgers	"Roamin' Bob-iday"	Fox
2019 (47th)	Marieve Herington	Tilly Green	Big City Greens	"Green Christmas"	Disney Channel
2019 (47th)	Sarah Stiles	Spinel	Steven Universe: The Movie		Cartoon Network
2019 (47th)	Debi Derryberry	Helpy	Tigtone	"Tigtone and the Cemetery of the Dead"	Adult Swim
2019 (47th)	Ali Wong	Bertie	Tuca & Bertie	"The Jelly Lakes"	Netflix

=== 2020s ===
Year	Recipient	Character(s)	Program	Episode	Network
2020 (48th)
2020 (48th)	David Bradley	Merlin	Wizards: Tales of Arcadia	"Our Final Act"	Netflix
2020 (48th)	Jessica DiCicco	Annie	It's Pony	"Pet Pony", "Dog Day"	Nickelodeon
2020 (48th)	Jeff Bennett	Erik the Wretched	DreamWorks Dragons: Rescue Riders	"Hunt for the Golden Dragon"	Netflix
2020 (48th)	Ashley Tisdale	Candace Flynn	Phineas and Ferb the Movie: Candace Against the Universe		Disney+
2020 (48th)	Patrick Seitz	Tygra, Mumm-Ra	ThunderCats Roar	"ThunderSlobs"	Cartoon Network
2021 (49th)
2021 (49th)	Ella Purnell	Jinx	Arcane	"When These Walls Come Tumbling Down"	Netflix
2021 (49th)	Michael J. Woodard	Arlo	Arlo the Alligator Boy		Netflix
2021 (49th)	Parvesh Cheena	Zulius	Centaurworld	"Johnny Teatimes Be Best Competition: A Quest for the Sash"	Netflix
2021 (49th)	Kimberly Brooks	Bumblebee	DC Super Hero Girls	"#EnterNightSting"	Cartoon Network
2021 (49th)	Charlie Saxton	Toby Domzalski	Trollhunters: Rise of the Titans		Netflix
2022 (50th)	Maurice LaMarche	Mr. Big	Zootopia+	"The Godfather of the Bride"	Disney+
2022 (50th)	Candi Milo	Witch Hazel	Looney Tunes Cartoons	"Hex Appeal"	HBO Max
2022 (50th)	Fred Tatasciore	Bang	StoryBots: Answer Time	"Glue"	Netflix
2022 (50th)	Tara Strong	Batgirl, Harley Quinn and Raven	Teen Titans Go! & DC Super Hero Girls: Mayhem in the Multiverse		Cartoon Network
2022 (50th)	Karen Malina White	Dijonay Jones	The Proud Family: Louder and Prouder	"New Kids On The Block"	Disney+
2023 (51st)	Diamond White	Lunella Lafayette / Moon Girl	Marvel's Moon Girl and Devil Dinosaur	"Moon Girl Landing"	Disney Channel
2023 (51st)	Aisha Tyler	Lana Kane	Archer	"Keys Open Doors"	FXX
2023 (51st)	Alex Lawther	Velveteen Rabbit	The Velveteen Rabbit		Apple TV+
2023 (51st)	Dan Stevens	Korvo	Solar Opposites	"The Re-Visibility Bouillabaisse"	Hulu
2023 (51st)	Vico Ortiz	Serena	Craig Before the Creek		Cartoon Network
2024 (52nd)
2024 (52nd)	Paula Pell	Paula Persimmon	Dream Productions	"Out of Body"	Disney+
2024 (52nd)	Ayo Edebiri	April O'Neil	Tales of the Teenage Mutant Ninja Turtles	"Splinter and April Fight a Goldfish"	Paramount+
2024 (52nd)	Jeremy Jordan	Lucifer Morningstar	Hazbin Hotel	"Dad Beat Dad"	Amazon Prime Video
2024 (52nd)	John Roberts	Linda Belcher	Bob's Burgers	"The Right Tough Stuff"	Fox
2024 (52nd)	Kristen Schaal	Louise Belcher	Bob's Burgers	"They Slug Horses, Don't They?"	Fox
2025 (53rd)
2025 (53rd)	Dan Mintz	Tina Belcher	Bob's Burgers	"Don't Worry Be Hoopy"	Fox
2025 (53rd)	Erika Henningsen	Charlie Morningstar	Hazbin Hotel	"Hazbin Hotel: Behind Closed Doors"	Amazon Prime Video
2025 (53rd)	Abbi Jacobson	Shira Schwooper	Long Story Short	"Shira Can't Cook"	Netflix
2025 (53rd)	Zach Hadel	Evil Wizard	Smiling Friends	"Shmaloogles"	Adult Swim
2025 (53rd)	Alkaio Thiele	Gumball Watterson	The Wonderfully Weird World of Gumball	"The Amadain"	Hulu

== Multiple wins ==
3 wins

- Tom Kenny
- Rob Paulsen

2 wins

- June Foray
- Eartha Kitt
- Maurice LaMarche
- Kristen Schaal

== See also ==
- Primetime Emmy Award for Outstanding Voice-Over Performance
