= 39th Annie Awards =

US media awards ceremony held in 2012

- Date: February 4, 2012
- Site: Royce Hall; Los Angeles, California, U.S.
- Hosted by: Patton Oswalt
- Organized by: ASIFA-Hollywood

Highlights
- Best Animated Feature: Rango
- Best Direction: Jennifer Yuh Nelson; Kung Fu Panda 2
- Most awards: Prep & Landing: Naughty vs. Nice and Rango (4)
- Most nominations: Kung Fu Panda 2 (12)

The 39th Annual Annie Awards honoring the best in animation of 2011 were held on February 4, 2012, at Royce Hall in Los Angeles, California.

== Production nominees ==
Nominations announced on December 5, 2011

=== Best Animated Feature ===
Rango - Paramount/Nickelodeon Movies, Blind Wink, GK Films

- A Cat in Paris – Folimage
- Wrinkles – Perro Verde Films, S.L.
- Arthur Christmas – Columbia/Sony Pictures Animation, Aardman Animations
- Cars 2 – Disney/Pixar
- Chico & Rita – Chico & Rita Distribution Limited
- Kung Fu Panda 2 - DreamWorks Animation
- Puss in Boots - DreamWorks Animation
- Rio - 20th Century Fox/Blue Sky Studios
- The Adventures of Tintin - Paramount, Columbia/Amblin Entertainment, The Kennedy/Marshall Company, Nickelodeon Movies, WingNut Films

=== Best Animated Special Production ===
Kung Fu Panda: Secrets of the Masters - DreamWorks Animation

- Adventure Time: Thank You - Cartoon Network Studios
- Batman: Year One - Warner Bros. Animation
- Ice Age: A Mammoth Christmas - Blue Sky Studios
- Prey 2 - Blur Studio
- Star Tours - Industrial Light & Magic

=== Best Animated Short Subject ===
Adam and Dog – Lodge Films

- I Tawt I Taw A Puddy Tat – Warner Bros. Animation
- La Luna – Pixar
- (Notes on) Biology – Ornana
- Paths of Hate – Platige Image
- Sunday – National Film Board of Canada
- The Ballad of Nessie –Walt Disney Animation Studios
- The Girl and the Fox – Base14
- Wild Life – National Film Board of Canada and Studio GDS

=== Best Animated Television Commercial ===
Twinings "Sea" – Psyop

- Audi "Hummingbird" - The Mill
- Geico "Foghorn" – Renegade Animation
- McDonald's "Apple Tree" – Duck Studios/Kompost
- McDonald's "Suzi Van Zoom" – Duck Studios/Kompost
- Norton "Stuff" – Psyop
- O2 "Niggles & Narks" – The Mill
- Statoil "Good Night" – Studio AKA
- "The Pirate" – Meindbender

=== Best General Audience Animated TV Production ===
The Simpsons - Gracie Films

- Archer - FX Productions
- Green Lantern: The Animated Series - Warner Bros. Animation
- Hoops & YoYo Ruin Christmas - Hallmark
- Mad - Warner Bros. Animation
- Mary Shelley's Frankenhole Season 2 - Starburns Industries, Inc
- Prep & Landing: Naughty vs. Nice - Walt Disney Animation Studios
- Star Wars: The Clone Wars - Lucasfilm Animation, Ltd.

=== Best Animated Television Production - Preschool ===
Jake and the Never Land Pirates – Disney Television Animation

- Chuggington – Ludorum plc
- Mickey Mouse Clubhouse – Disney Television Animation
- The WotWots Season 2 – Pukeko Pictures

=== Best Animated Television Production – Children ===
The Amazing World of Gumball – Cartoon Network in Association with Dandelion Studios, Boulder Media & Studio Soi

- Fanboy & Chum Chum – Nickelodeon and Frederator
- Kung Fu Panda: Legends of Awesomeness – Nickelodeon and DreamWorks Animation
- The Penguins of Madagascar – Nickelodeon and DreamWorks Animation

=== Best Animated Video Game ===
Insanely Twisted Shadow Planet – Shadow Planet Productions, Gagne/Fuelcell

- Bumpy Road – Simogo
- Catherine – Atlus
- Gears of War 3 – Epic Games
- Gesundheit! – Konami Digital Entertainment
- Ghost Trick: Phantom Detective – Capcom
- Ratchet & Clank: All 4 One – Insomniac Games
- Rayman Origins – Ubisoft Montpellier
- Uncharted 3: Drake's Deception – Naughty Dog

== Individual Achievement Categories ==
=== Animated Effects in an Animated Production ===
Kevin Romond - The Adventures of Tintin: The Secret of the Unicorn - Amblin Entertainment, Wingnut Films and The Kennedy/Marshall Company

- Can Yuksel - Puss in Boots - DreamWorks Animation
- Chase Cooper - Rango - Industrial Light & Magic
- Dan Lund - Winnie the Pooh - Walt Disney Animation Studios
- Dave Tidgwell - Kung Fu Panda 2 - DreamWorks Animation
- Eric Froemling - Cars 2 - Pixar
- Jason Mayer - Kung Fu Panda 2 - DreamWorks Animation
- Joel Aron - Star Wars: The Clone Wars - Lucasfilm Animation, Ltd.
- Jon Reisch - Cars 2 - Pixar
- Willi Geiger - Rango - Industrial Light & Magic

=== Animated Effects in a Live Action Production ===
Florent Andorra - Transformers: Dark of the Moon - Industrial Light & Magic

- Branko Grujcic - Pirates of the Caribbean: On Stranger Tides - Industrial Light & Magic
- Gary Wu - Cowboys & Aliens - Industrial Light & Magic
- Lee Uren - Cowboys & Aliens - Industrial Light & Magic

=== Character Animation in a Television Production ===
Tony Smeed - Prep & Landing: Naughty vs. Nice - Walt Disney Animation Studios

- Chad Sellers - Prep & Landing: Naughty vs. Nice - Walt Disney Animation Studios
- Michael Franceschi - Kung Fu Panda: Legends of Awesomeness - Nickelodeon and DreamWorks Animation
- Rebecca Wilson Bresee - Prep & Landing: Naughty vs. Nice - Walt Disney Animation Studios
- Sihanouk Mariona - Mary Shelley's Frankenhole Season 2 - Starburns Industries, Inc.

=== Character Animation in a Feature Production ===
Jeff Gabor - Rio - Blue Sky Studios

- Andreas Deja - Winnie the Pooh - Walt Disney Animation Studios
- Dan Wagner - Kung Fu Panda 2 - DreamWorks Animation
- Mark Henn - Winnie the Pooh - Walt Disney Animation Studios
- Olivier Staphylas - Puss in Boots - DreamWorks Animation
- Patrik Puhala - Rio - Blue Sky Studios
- Pierre Perifel - Kung Fu Panda 2 - DreamWorks Animation

=== Character Animation in a Live Action Production ===
Eric Reynolds - Rise of the Planet of the Apes - 20th Century Fox

- Andy Arnett - Hop - Rhythm & Hues, Illumination Entertainment
- David Lowry - Paul - Double Negative Visual Effects for Universal Productions/ Relativity Media/Working Title Films/Big Talk Productions
- Mike Hull - Paul - Double Negative Visual Effects for Universal Productions/ Relativity Media/Working Title Films/Big Talk Productions

=== Character Design in a Television Production ===
Bill Schwab - Prep & Landing: Naughty vs. Nice – Walt Disney Animation Studios

- Carl Raggio Kick Buttowski – Disney Television Animation
- Chad Hurd Archer – FX Productions
- Chris Battle Dan Vs. – Starz Film Roman
- Eric Robles Fanboy & Chum Chum – Nickelodeon & Frederator
- Gordon Hammond T.U.F.F. Puppy – Nickelodeon
- Mike Dougherty T.U.F.F. Puppy – Nickelodeon
- Robert Ryan Cory Secret Mountain Fort Awesome – Cartoon Network Studios

=== Character Design in a Feature Production ===
Mark "Crash" McCreery - Rango – Paramount Pictures and Nickelodeon Movies Blind Wink/GK films Productions

- Jay Shuster - Cars 2 – Pixar
- Patrick Mate - Puss in Boots – DreamWorks Animation
- Peter de Seve - Arthur Christmas – Sony Pictures Animation, Aardman Animations
- Sergio Pablos - Rio – Blue Sky Studios

=== Directing in a Television Production ===
Matthew Nastuk - The Simpsons – Gracie Films

- Brian Sheesley - Dan Vs. – Starz Film Roman
- Chris Savino & Clay Morrow - Kick Buttowski – Disney Television Animation
- Dan Riba - Ben 10: Ultimate Alien – Cartoon Network Studios
- Duke Johnson - Community – 23 D Films, Inc.
- Gabe Swarr - Kung Fu Panda: Legends of Awesomeness – Nickelodeon and DreamWorks Animation
- Ken Bruce - T.U.F.F. Puppy – Nickelodeon
- Kevin Deters & Stevie Wermers-Skelton - Prep & Landing: Naughty vs. Nice – Walt Disney Animation Studios
- Mic Graves & Ben Bocquelet - The Amazing World of Gumball – Cartoon Network Europe in association with Dandelion Studios, Boulder Media & Studio Soi
- Peter Hausner - Ninjago: Masters of Spinjitzu – Wil Film
- Steve Loter, Christo Stamboliev, Shaun Cashman, David Knott - The Penguins of Madagascar – Nickelodeon and Technicolor
- Tony Craig - Hoops & YoYo Ruin Christmas – Hallmark

=== Directing in a Feature Production ===
Jennifer Yuh Nelson - Kung Fu Panda 2 – DreamWorks Animation

- Carlos Saldanha - Rio – Blue Sky Studios
- Chris Miller Puss in Boots – DreamWorks Animation
- Don Hall & Stephen Anderson - Winnie the Pooh – Walt Disney Animation Studios
- Gore Verbinski - Rango – Paramount Pictures and Nickelodeon Movies, Blind Wink/GK films Productions
- Kelly Asbury - Gnomeo & Juliet – Touchstone Pictures

=== Music in a Television Production ===
Grace Potter, Michael Giacchino - Prep & Landing: Naughty vs. Nice – Walt Disney Animation Studios

- Adam Berry, Bob Schooley, Mark McCorkle - The Penguins of Madagascar – Nickelodeon and DreamWorks Animation
- Ben Locket - The Amazing World of Gumball – Cartoon Network Europe in association with Dandelion Studios, Boulder Media & Studio Soi
- Frederik Wiedmann - Green Lantern: The Animated Series – Warner Bros. Animation
- Joel McNeely, Brendan Milburn and Valerie Vigoda - Pixie Hollow Games – DisneyToon Studios
- Kevin Kliesch - Thundercats – Warner Bros. Animation and Cartoon Network
- Shawn Patterson, Zeb Wells - Robot Chicken – ShadowMachine and Stoopid Monkey in association with Adult Swim

=== Music in a Feature Production ===
John Williams - The Adventures of Tintin – Amblin Entertainment, Wingnut Films and The Kennedy/Marshall Company

- Henry Jackman - Puss in Boots – DreamWorks Animation
- Mikael Mutti, Siedah Garrett, Carlinhos Brown, Sergio Mendes, John Powell - Rio – Blue Sky Studios
- Zooey Deschanel, Kristen Anderson-Lopez, Henry Jackman, Robert Lopez - Winnie The Pooh – Walt Disney Animation Studios

=== Production Design in a Television Production ===
Mark Bodnar, Chris Tsirgiotis, Sue Mondt and Daniel Elson – Secret Mountain Fort Awesome – Cartoon Network Studios

- Peter Martin Hoops & YoYo Ruin Christmas – Hallmark

=== Production Design in a Feature Production ===
Raymond Zilbach - Kung Fu Panda 2 – DreamWorks Animation

- Harley Jessup - Cars 2 – Pixar
- Paul Felix - Winnie the Pooh – Walt Disney Animation Studios
- Thomas Cardone, Kyle MacNaughton & Peter Chan Rio – Blue Sky Studios

=== Storyboarding in a Television Production ===
Brian Kesinger – Prep & Landing: Naughty vs. Nice – Walt Disney Animation Studios

- Barry W. Johnson Prep & Landing: Naughty vs. Nice – Walt Disney Animation Studios
- Benton Connor Regular Show – Cartoon Network Studios
- Dave Thomas T.U.F.F. Puppy – Nickelodeon
- Fred Gonzalez T.U.F.F. Puppy – Nickelodeon
- Joe Mateo Prep & Landing: Naughty vs. Nice – Walt Disney Animation Studios
- Justin Nichols Fanboy & Chum Chum – Nickelodeon & Frederator
- Katie Rice Fanboy & Chum Chum – Nickelodeon & Frederator
- Rebecca Sugar Adventure Time – Cartoon Network Studios

=== Storyboarding in a Feature Production ===
Jeremy Spears - Winnie the Pooh – Walt Disney Animation Studios

- Bob Logan - Puss in Boots – DreamWorks Animation
- Delia Gosman - Rango – Paramount Pictures & Nickelodeon Movies present A Blind Wink/GK Films Production
- Gary Graham - Kung Fu Panda 2 – DreamWorks Animation
- Josh Hayes - Rango – Paramount Pictures & Nickelodeon Movies present A Blind Wink/GK Films Production
- Kris Pearn - Arthur Christmas – Sony Pictures Animation, Aardman Animations
- Nelson Yokota - Gnomeo & Juliet – Touchstone Pictures
- Philip Craven - Kung Fu Panda 2 – DreamWorks Animation
- Scott Morse - Cars 2 – Pixar

=== Voice Acting in a Television Production ===
Jeff Bennett as Kowalski - The Penguins of Madagascar – Nickelodeon and DreamWorks Animation

- Carlos Alazraqui as Denzel Crocker - Fairly OddParents – Nickelodeon
- Dan Harmon as Jekyll - Mary Shelley's Frankenhole Season 2 – Starburns Industries, Inc.
- Daran Norris as Cosmo - Fairly OddParents – Nickelodeon
- Dee Bradley Baker as Clone Troopers - Star Wars: The Clone Wars – Lucasfilm Animation, Ltd.
- Diedrich Bader as Batman - Batman: The Brave and the Bold – Warner Bros. Animation
- H. Jon Benjamin as Sterling Archer - Archer – FX Productions
- Jeff B. Davis as Victor Frankenstein - Mary Shelley's Frankenhole Season 2 – Starburns Industries, Inc.
- Jessica Walter as Malory Archer - Archer – FX Productions
- Judy Greer as Cheryl Tunt - Archer – FX Productions
- Logan Grove as Gumball - The Amazing World of Gumball – Cartoon Network Europe in association with Dandelion Studios, Boulder Media & Studio Soi
- Nika Futterman as Asajj Ventress - Star Wars: The Clone Wars – Lucasfilm Animation, Ltd.
- Scott Adsit as the Creature - Mary Shelley's Frankenhole Season 2 – Starburns Industries, Inc.
- Tara Strong as Timmy Turner - Fairly OddParents – Nickelodeon

=== Voice Acting in a Feature Production ===
Bill Nighy as Grandsanta - Arthur Christmas – Sony Pictures Animation, Aardman Animations

- Ashley Jensen as Bryony - Arthur Christmas – Sony Pictures Animation, Aardman Animations
- Gary Oldman as Shen - Kung Fu Panda 2 – DreamWorks Animation
- James Hong as Mr. Ping - Kung Fu Panda 2 DreamWorks Animation
- Jemaine Clement as Nigel - Rio – Blue Sky Studios
- Jim Cummings as Featherstone - Gnomeo & Juliet – Touchstone Pictures
- Zach Galifianakis as Humpty Alexander Dumpty - Puss in Boots – DreamWorks Animation

=== Best Writing in an Animated Television Production ===
Carolyn Omine – The Simpsons - "Treehouse of Horror XXII" – Gracie Films

- Blake Lemons, William Reiss, C. H. Greenblatt, Derek Evanick, Diana Lafyatis, Neil Graf Disney Fish Hooks – Fish School Musical – Disney Television Animation
- Dani Michaeli, Sean Charmatz, Nate Cash, Luke Brookshier, Paul Tibbitt SpongeBob SquarePants - "Patrick's Staycation" – Nickelodeon
- Josh Weinstein Futurama - "All the Presidents' Heads" – The Curiosity Company in association with 20th Century Fox Television
- Ray DeLaurentis, Will Schifrin, Kevin Sullivan T.U.F.F. Puppy – "Thunder Dog" – Nickelodeon
- Matt Maiellaro, Dave Willis Aqua Unit Patrol Squad 1 – "The Creditor" – Williams Street Studios, Adult Swim
- Ray DeLaurentis, Will Schifrin, Kevin Sullivan The Fairly OddParents – "Invasion of the Dads" – Nickelodeon
- Steve Wermers-Skelton, Kevin Deters Prep & Landing: Naughty vs. Nice – Walt Disney Animation Studios

=== Writing in a Feature Production ===
John Logan, Gore Verbinski and James Byrkit – Rango – Paramount Pictures and Nickelodeon Movies present A Blind Wink/GK Films Productions

- Andy Riley, Kevin Cecil, Mark Burton, Kathy Greenberg, Emily Cook, Rob Sprackling, John R. Smith, Kelly Asbury, Steve Hamilton Shaw Gnomeo & Juliet – Touchstone Pictures
- Brian Kesinger, Kendelle Hoyer, Don Dougherty, Clio Chiang, Don Hall, Stephen Anderson, Nicole Mitchell, Jeremy Spears Winnie the Pooh – Walt Disney Animation Studios
- Sarah Smith, Peter Baynham Arthur Christmas – Sony Pictures Animation, Aardman Animations
- Steve Moffat, Edgar Wright, Joe Cronish The Adventures of Tintin: The Secret of the Unicorn– Amblin Entertainment, Wingnut Films, and Kennedy/Marshall

=== Editing in Television Production ===
Ted Machold, Jeff Adams, Doug Tiano, Bob Tomlin – Penguins of Madagascar – Nickelodeon and DreamWorks Animation

- Garret Elkins Mary Shelley's Frankenhole Season 2 – Starburn Industries, Inc.
- Hugo Morales, Davrick Waltjen, Adam Arnold, and Otto Ferrene Kung Fu Panda Nickelodeon and DreamWorks Animation
- Jason W.A. Tucker Star Wars: The Clone Wars – Lucasfilm Animation, Ltd.
- Paul D. Calder Futurama – The Curiosity Company in association with 20th Century Fox Television

=== Editing in a Feature Production ===
Craig Wood, A.C.E. – Rango – Paramount Pictures and Nickelodeon Movies present A Blind Wink/GK Films Production

- Clare Knight, A.C.E. Kung Fu Panda 2 – DreamWorks Animation
- Erika Dapkewicz (Note: Awarded as Eric Dapkewicz; Dapkewicz came out as transgender and changed her name in the 2010s.) Puss in Boots – DreamWorks Animation
- Michael Kahn The Adventures of Tintin: The Secret of the Unicorn– Amblin Entertainment, Wingnut Films and Kennedy/Marshall
- Stephen Schaffer, A.C.E. Cars 2 – Pixar

== Juried awards ==
Winsor McCay Award
Walt Peregoy, Borge Ring, and Ronald Searle

June Foray
Art Leonardi

Special Achievement
Depth Analysis
