= Cheryl Tunt =

Fictional character

- Archer character
- Promotional image
- First appearance: "Mole Hunt" (2009)
- Last appearance: Archer: Into the Cold (2023)
- Created by: Adam Reed
- Voiced by: Judy Greer (speaking); Jessy Lynn Martens (singing, Archer Vice)

In-universe information
- Alias: Cheryl Gimple; Carol; Cristal; Cariña; Cherlene (professional stagename); Charlotte Vandertunt (Archer Dreamland); Charlotte Stratton (née Vandertunt)(Archer Danger Island)
- Occupation: Secretary for the International Secret Intelligence Service (ISIS); Secretary of the Figgis Agency
- Family: Cecil Tunt (brother); Babou (pet ocelot)

Cheryl Tunt is a fictional character of the American adult animated sitcom Archer. Created by Adam Reed as one of the show's original supporting characters, she is voiced by Judy Greer and debuted in the series' pilot episode, "Mole Hunt", on September 17, 2009.

Cheryl, the heiress of the wealthy Tunt family, is introduced as the incompetent personal assistant to Malory Archer (Jessica Walter). She is portrayed as an emotionally fragile, ditzy personality in Archer's early years; among her attributes are her choking fetish and addiction to rubber cement. Archer's subsequent years see her take on different occupations and personae—most notably aspiring country singer Cherlene in Archer Vice—as the show experiments with new ideas, character arcs and self-contained narratives. Her characterization has been well received by the media, as has Greer's acting. At the 39th Annie Awards, Greer received an Annie Award nomination for outstanding achievement in voice acting.

== Arc and personality ==
Cheryl Tunt debuted in Archer's first episode, "Mole Hunt", as the incompetent secretary of Malory Archer (Jessica Walter). Cheryl's early storylines focus on her attempts to sabotage Cyril Figgis' (Chris Parnell) relationship with Lana Kane (Aisha Tyler), whom she greatly despises. Cyril, emasculated by Lana and increasingly suspicious of her relationship with Sterling Archer (H. Jon Benjamin), agrees to have sex with Cheryl. Paranoid that Lana may discover his infidelity, he distances himself from Cheryl afterward, much to her dismay. Cheryl threatens to tell Lana of their affair to force him into continuing it, although in a conversation with Pam Poovey (Amber Nash), she reveals her true intentions were to make Sterling jealous. Though Lana catches Cyril cheating with Framboise, the former human relations head at the Organization of Democratic Intelligence Networks (ODIN), Cheryl nonetheless reveals the affair to her, adding more tension to their rivalry.

I think she likes it. I think she’s lonely, and it’s a crazy environment. And it’s fun and these people are nuts, and maybe no one’s as nuts as her. I mean, it’s become her family because her family is dead.

— Judy Greer

As heiress to the Tunt family railroad fortune, Cheryl is subjected to numerous threats and kidnappings. She and her brother Cecil (Eugene Mirman) inherit US$1 billion in trust funds after the death of their parents; the fortune is split evenly amongst each party, and Cheryl's net worth balloons tenfold. This results in an attempted kidnapping, which ultimately fails when the robbers mistake Pam for Cheryl. Cecil even attempts to extort her wealth after an unprofitable investment in an undersea research facility leaves him bankrupt.

Cheryl is introduced as an emotionally fragile woman who craves Sterling's affection. The character becomes an increasingly maniacal and unstable personality in Archer's evolution. Greer recalled in an interview, "It was really fun to see her evolve and I think [Reed] and I always had fun recording together. I'm so thankful that it got so crazy and turned so upside down, and how nuts this character is. It's so fun." Cheryl's instability has resulted in involuntary commitment, and she is often sexually aroused from being choked. Reviewers have described Cheryl as "incompetent", "insane", "glue-chugging", and "empty-headed". Throughout Archer's early seasons, the character creates a number of aliases as part of one of the comedy's longtime running gags.

My interpretation is that she isn’t trying to keep the secret. That she doesn’t care. She changed her last name to avoid getting kidnapped, but really, if anyone figured it out and asked her, she’d just probably be like “Yeah, shut up!” or whatever. I feel like everyone at ISIS is so self-involved and so concerned with furthering their own agenda that it would never occur to them to think that anyone else has anything else going on.

In the show's subsequent years, Cheryl assumes a number of new personae—the rising country music superstar known professionally as Cherlene, and Charlotte Vandertunt, heiress to the Vandertunt media empire.

== Development ==
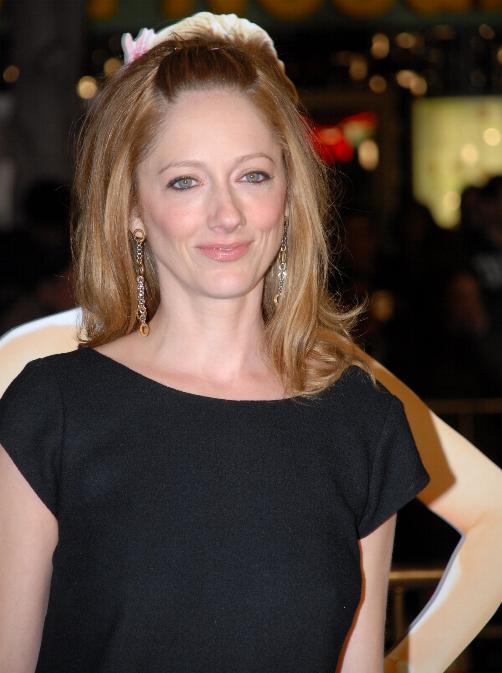
Judy Greer, the voice of Cheryl Tunt

Judy Greer provides the voice of Cheryl Tunt. Greer came to the Archer producers' attention for her work in Glenn Martin, DDS, and she joined the show because of her desire to break into voice acting, after previous attempts had failed. She and casting director Linda Lamontagne, whom she worked with in Glenn Martin, DDS, consulted with the producers in Los Angeles for the role: "She was kind of relentless with them, saying 'Use her, use her.' I read for many different roles and then finally they cast me." When Greer began recording her lines at a studio in Phoenix, she believed Archer was too raunchy to be commissioned for network TV. The actress said, "So when I found out it was picked up, I was like, 'Oh! Wait, I don't know what you're talking about.' They said, 'Remember that thing?' And I went, 'Really?' So then I recorded a bunch of them, and the scripts were the funniest scripts that I've ever read, and so crazy."

Animators based Cheryl's initial physical appearance on Siobhan Price, a writer and producer at Adult Swim.

Prior to Greer's casting, Cheryl was expected to be merely a supporting character for Archer, part of a running gag where Sterling impregnates Malory's secretaries. Reed remarked, "Whenever it happened, they would gas them with sleeping gas and just leave them on the steps at Bellevue Hospital with no ID or memory of what just happened. But when Judy agreed to do the show, Cheryl became a much more important character."

== Reception ==
Cheryl's characterization and Greer's voice work has been well received by the media. HitFix's Alan Sepinwall called Cheryl his favorite character on the show. In her review for "El Secuestro", Emily VanDerWerff of The A.V. Club felt that Greer's performance was an episode highlight, where she effectively captures her character's quirk. VanDerWerff wrote, "Greer is mostly just asked to say crazy things as Cheryl, and that’s fun, but she steps it up here, playing both Cheryl’s insanity and the part of her that’s a spoiled trust-fund kid who’s found a day job and has to ride the subway with a dwarf that freaks her out." Likewise, Ian MacDonald of TV Overmind said the writers "found a great way to expand on ISIS' most emotionally unstable employees"; "Cheryl, whose crazy has been escalated to an almost extreme," MacDonald stated, "seems almost justified in her maladjusted-ness. She's a billionaire heiress who owns an ocelot and drinks glue [...]. Humor involving insane rich people just no[t] getting it is usually pretty funny, and if anyone can pull it off, it's Adam Reed and [Judy] Greer." Alongside fellow cast members Jessica Walter and H. Jon Benjamin, Greer was a candidate for an Annie Award in the category of Voice Acting in a Television Production—the award was given to Jeff Bennett for his work in the Nickelodeon television series The Penguins of Madagascar.
