= Sterling Archer =

Fictional spy in the television series Archer

- Archer character
- Promotional image
- First appearance: "Mole Hunt" (2009)
- Last appearance: Archer: Into the Cold (2023)
- Created by: Adam Reed
- Voiced by: H. Jon Benjamin
- Inspired by: James Bond by Ian Fleming

In-universe information
- Alias: Duchess (Code Name)
- Occupation: ISIS agent; CIA contractor (formerly); Drug dealer (formerly); Private investigator (formerly); Pilot of Lucy Goosey (dream persona); Captain of the Seamus (dream persona)
- Family: Malory Archer (mother); Ron Cadillac (stepfather)
- Significant others: Katya Kasanova (ex-fiancée; later throuple); Barry Dylan (throttle); Lana Kane (ex-girlfriend)
- Children: Abbiejean Malory "A.J." Kane-Archer (daughter) Seamus Sterling "The Wee Baby Seamus" McGoon Archer (legally declared/non-biological son)
- Nationality: American
- Born: date unspecified Tangier, Morocco

Sterling Malory Archer, almost exclusively referred to by his surname Archer, and sometimes referred to by his codename Duchess, is a fictional character and the titular protagonist of the American adult animated sitcom Archer. Created by Adam Reed, he is voiced by H. Jon Benjamin and debuted in the series' pilot episode, "Mole Hunt", on September 17, 2009.

Inspired by James Bond, Archer is an alcoholic, womanizing secret agent of the International Secret Intelligence Service (ISIS), a fictional New York-based intelligence service headed by his mother Malory (Jessica Walter). His narcissism, sharp sense of humor, and complex relationships with his co-workers serve as important aspects of his character. Archer's subsequent years see him take on different occupations and personae as the show experiments with new ideas, character arcs and self-contained narratives.

The characterization of Archer, and Benjamin's performance of the character, have been well received by the media. Benjamin has received numerous accolades, including a Primetime Emmy nomination and an Annie Award nomination, for outstanding achievement in voice acting.

== Attributes ==
=== Background ===
Archer was born in Tangier as the only child of Malory Archer (Jessica Walter), the retired agent-turned-director of the New York-based International Secret Intelligence Service (ISIS). Due to Malory's involvement in espionage throughout World War II, Archer was raised until age 5 by his servant, Woodhouse. The whereabouts of his biological father are unknown barring a fake identity conceived by Malory, though he briefly appears as a faceless figure in a dream sequence in the season four episode "Once Bitten", as Archer hallucinates from a cobra bite. Archer spent his youth at a boarding school, where he excelled at lacrosse. As a result, Archer was offered an athletic scholarship to Johns Hopkins University, but the offer fell through after he was shot in the abdomen. Although not explicitly stated, a background photo in season two's "Placebo Effect" hints Archer may have instead graduated from Georgetown University. Archer has a fondness for the name Randy and has often gone undercover using the name as part of his disguise.

=== Personality ===
The comic efficacy of Archer's personality lies in his narcissism and unremitting snark. The character is described as "rude, sexist, and a terrible boss" without a moment's regret. He frequently harasses his peers with caustic jokes, one-liners and over-the-top, elaborate voicemail pranks. Archer is a full-blown alcoholic who uses his position to entice women into sex. Reed envisioned Archer as "dickish as possible", albeit a somewhat sympathetic character à la James Bond, with whom Archer shares his model of gun, the Walther PPK. Archer becomes an even more sympathetic personality as the series evolves in later seasons, when revelations about his troubled past, fears, affection for animals, and a deep admiration of Burt Reynolds, among others, come to light. During the 6th and 7th season severe trauma and important events, in the form of cancer, the death of his ex-fiancée Katya Kazanova (later revived as a cyborg), the death of his possible father Nikolai Jakov, the birth of his daughter, and his relationship with his mother, heavily influence his moral compass and his sense of personal responsibility.

Archer has complex relationships with many of his coworkers. The turbulence between him and Malory stems from years of childhood neglect, resulting in interactions that are often "fraught, laden with [...] memories of unforgiven slights, and the needy fears that accompany codependence". These feelings are sometimes manifested by sexual tension, evidenced when Archer at one point shouts his mother's name while having sex with longtime love interest Lana Kane (Aisha Tyler), and gets an erection after thinking about her death. Archer's relationship with Lana is likewise tumultuous because of his infidelity and immature behavior. Yet she has a new found compassion for him when he becomes ill with cancer, and by the time their daughter is born, their relationship is such that Archer is "willing to put his money [...] where other people's mouths are in order to protect his family."

== Storylines ==
Archer is introduced in the pilot episode "Mole Hunt", as a special agent for the intelligence agency International Secret Intelligence Service (ISIS). He attempts to make amends with a resistant ex-girlfriend, Lana Kane, who ended their relationship six months prior because of an affair. The situation is further exacerbated by Cyril Figgis, who is Lana's companion at the time. Concurrently, he had a brief relationship with secretary Cheryl Tunt. Lana's drive to get revenge on Archer for cheating on her is fairly evident throughout the initial half of the first season, even going as far as to shoot him on multiple occasions. Unbeknownst to Archer, Malory has been keeping in contact with Nikolai Jakov and Len Trexler, one of whom—despite serving for rivaling agencies—could possibly be his real father. By "Dial M for Mother", he becomes suspicious of Malory's sly tactics, which prompts her to affirm that the identity of Archer's biological father is unknown.

Much of the second season of Archer is devoted to the character identifying his real father. Archer travels to Russia to find out whether Jakov is his biological father, only to be stranded and kidnapped by agents of the Soviet Committee for State Security (KGB). Worried about her missing son, Malory sends nemesis Barry Dylan to rescue Archer from the KGB—Barry is later severely injured after falling from grabbing onto Archer's legs for dear life. Although unsuccessful at finding out the DNA results, he meets Katya Kasanova, a former KGB spymaster looking to enter into ISIS. Eventually, the couple get married; however, the marriage is interrupted by Barry, who is now a cyborg revitalized by the KGB (in a parody of The Six Million Dollar Man). Following a growing disdain of Archer after previously destroying his femur and having anal sex with his (now ex-)fiancée, Barry attempts to murder him. Katya unsuccessfully attempts to kill Barry by jumping off of the roof of Archer's apartment building, sacrificing herself in the process. During the search for his father, Archer develops breast cancer after being exposed to high doses of radiation. Although the group thinks that he has entered into remission by the latter half of "Stage Two", the following episode concedes that the tumor has progressed into stage-two breast cancer. Treatment for the tumor (aside from the copious amounts of marijuana he was using) consisted of sucrose pills and Zima, according to an evaluation commenced by Dr. Algernop Krieger, causing Lana and Archer to tackle a local Irish gang that has been smuggling anticancer drugs in lieu of the sucrose pills and Zima solution. In the same episode, it is revealed that Archer filmed his massacre of the Irish gang and edited it into a movie called, "Terms Of Enrampagement".

Distraught by his fiancée's death, Archer retreats to French Polynesia to recuperate from the frenetic pace of his occupation. Rip Riley, a former ISIS agent, is recruited by Malory to pursue him and return Archer to New York City. After a futile attempt, Lana and Ray Gillette are sent to rescue Archer and Riley, who have been kidnapped by pirates. Ultimately, the duo are captured by the pirates and put into a dungeon, where Riley, Noah (a doctoral candidate in anthropology who was enslaved by the pirates after they captured his research vessel), and Archer are being harbored. Malory prepares to administer a ransom for the group, but later declines to extort money to the assailants after being insulted by Archer. Now temporarily severed from ties with the International Security Intelligence Service, the group steals a helicopter and escapes from the pirate fortress.

FBI agents shut down ISIS as it turns out it was not sanctioned by the U.S. government to perform acts of espionage whatsoever. Throughout the fifth season, Archer and the rest of ISIS are selling the ton of cocaine they have stored in order to make enough money for early retirements, which they fail throughout the season. In the season finale, Malory succeeds in having ISIS reinstated as an official agency by cutting an affiliation deal with the CIA. At the same time, it is revealed that Archer is the father of Lana Kane's newborn daughter, conceived through in vitro fertilization from semen stored when Archer was being treated for cancer.

In season six, a reluctant Archer and his co-workers are reinstated as freelance agents working for the CIA on a trial basis. In the first episode, which takes place six weeks after the end of season five, Archer has been residing in Thailand because he was shocked that Lana used his sperm to conceive a child without his permission, but then he finally comes home after a mission in Borneo. For the rest of the season, Archer tries (and the most part fails) to be a part of his child's life and in episode eight goes with Lana to meet her parents, who, even though they don't think much of Archer, still consider him part of the family. In the finale, the CIA hires Archer and the others to save the life of a brilliant scientist by shrinking down and destroying a lethal blood clot in his brain. Even though they manage to destroy the blood clot, they end up killing the doctor when they prematurely regrow while inside him, with the CIA disavowing them and leaving them with nothing.

Archer convinces the group that they should start a detective agency in Los Angeles, setting up the events of season seven where they are subjected to the machinations of actress Veronica Deane. It eventually results in Archer being shot several times by Veronica in the season seven finale, later revealed to have survived but in a coma for three years. Season eight follows Archer in his coma-induced dream where he imagines himself as a private detective and all of his co-workers, friends and associates as characters in a 1940s-esque film noir setting known as "Dreamland". Season nine has Archer, remaining in a coma-induced dream, imagined as a co-pilot with Pam, who crash land onto the lush and mysterious Pacific island of Mitimotu. Season ten continues the coma-induced imagination themed setting, this time portraying Archer as the co-captain of the starship M/V Seamus in a "1970s vision of the future" reminiscent of Star Wars and Alien. He finally awakens from his coma after the three seasons to find that three years have passed and he now needs a cane to walk.

== Development ==
=== Conception ===
And I started reading those, and I had never read them before, and it was like, page one—this guy is a dick! He's a troubled man, and he's incredibly misogynistic. There's one scene—I forget which book it's from, but basically what happens is rape. It's like, 'She protested, but then Bond twisted her hand behind her back and took his reward.' Like, what the shit?!

— Adam Reed

After the cancellation of the television series Frisky Dingo in 2008, Reed took a year off from work and travelled to Europe and Morocco for leisure. He would often observe the general atmosphere of the environment around him. "I was in Europe and Morocco for most of the year," Reed recalled, "bumming around with a backpack and a scruffy beard, and sitting in cafes writing in my journal, seeing all these wealthy people and beautiful women, walking around, looking all European. I kept thinking about this world that I wasn't invited to going on behind me in these gorgeous buildings. I was like, 'I know there's some awesome cocktail party on the roof of that building, and I am walking around with a Hot Pocket.' So I kept thinking about, y'know, James Bond would totally be at that party, and would not be eating this Hot Pocket."

Hoping to become innovative in the spy fiction genre, Reed continued his endeavors at home. He read all of the James Bond novels, which were given to him several years previously by an acquaintance. Reed quickly alluded to the misogynist nature of the covers of the novels, which he described as Pulp Fiction–esque covers of Bond "assaulting a woman somehow while playing cards". Although the Archer creator wanted the title character to embody an obtuse, yet sympathetic personality, he was still apprehensive on modeling it after James Bond until viewing GoldenEye (1995); in the film, Reed was immediately captivated by Judi Dench's portrayal of M—the head of the Secret Intelligence Service. "I was spinning my wheels on that," Reed remarked, "and then it clicked when I was watching the James Bond reboot with Judi Dench as M, and then I thought what if M was James Bond's mother, and what a weird dynamic that would be, and what if they were both horrible people."

FX initially disapproved of Archer's bumbling demeanor, as similar endeavors have previously been done on multiple occasions. This made it especially difficult on Reed in writing the script for "Mole Hunt", the pilot episode of the series. "It was hard, if a guy's really good looking and apparently rich and has a great apartment and has really great clothes and dates all the girls and could kick your face off, if he's also the smartest guy in the room, you're not going to root for him." Indeed, he would often debate with the executives of FX on the character throughout the first season, but concerns later subsided after Reed asserted that Archer was merely overconfident, and not dumb. "He's just supremely confident and thinks that nothing bad is ever going to happen to him, so in these dangerous situations where he's being an idiot, he's just being willfully obtuse to see what will happen."

All of the main characters on the program were modeled after a select group of local residents of Atlanta. The producers then had them dressed in period clothing. "We just grabbed people around here, and then it was just sort of a fluke that they ended up looking like, to some extent, their real-life counterparts." Archer was designed after an electrician who, according to Adam Reed, was "exactly that handsome and also really nice".

=== Casting ===
Reed originally wanted to provide the voice of the character, but eventually recognized that his voice would stand out among other professional actors. H. Jon Benjamin—whom Reed was familiar with from his work on various Adult Swim cartoons such as The Venture Bros. and Home Movies—was approached by Reed for the role of Archer while Benjamin was visiting his parents in Tucson, Arizona. Benjamin was given a copy of the pilot script, and later recorded it at a Tucson studio the following week, relating, "So I think I just went in to this—it was in the back of this guy's house or something. He had a makeshift studio. So it felt dirty, but I don't think I read the script prior, didn't get it. I just happen to be visiting my parents and it all happened, so I just went in and read and it worked out well for them, not for my parents." Benjamin was ambivalent about the role, as he was apprehensive about imitating a spy. The Home Movies actor was a top prerogative for Reed in portraying the character because of his distinctive voice. "One of the reasons I think that you root for him, besides knowing that some of it isn't his fault, he's got this terrible mother and a terrible childhood, is Jon's delivery. It's so disarming that even the most conceited, hurtful, horrible things that Archer says, when Jon puts voice to them, they come across as not so bad."

== Reception ==
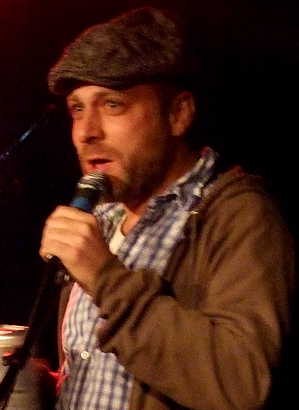
Benjamin's portrayal of Sterling Archer has attracted positive reviews from critics.

The character of Archer and Benjamin's voicework have been well received by critics. Dan Kois of Slate ascribed the character's lovability to his impulsive and callow disposition. "He has the wardrobe, sex life, and armaments of an adult superspy, but the soul (and impulse control) of a child." As Newsday writer Verne Gay affirmed, "Sterling Archer [...] is a suave if hard-bitten boozehound who, nonetheless, knows how to handle weaponry and women—sometimes." James Poniewozik of Time defined Archer as the "bluff" and "lunkheaded" star of the series, while USA Today's Whitney Matheson professed that the character is a callous, albeit attractive individual. San Francisco Chronicle columnist Tim Goodman attested that Benjamin's monotonous delivery of his lines was one of the highlights of the show. "Benjamin has a kind of laid-back, half-drunk, half-outraged banter that never fails to amuse," professed the San Francisco Chronicle journalist. Poniewozik echoed similar sentiments, who avouched that the actor evinced Archer's arrogant predilection. To Maureen Ryan of the Chicago Tribune, Benjamin delivered a unique inflection and attitude that she described was purely "Archer-ian".

Critics have generally applauded the storylines that have involved the character. Alan Sepinwall of HitFix commented that the series shines when the writers "are able to straddle the line between Archer being an ignorant baby and a witty spy capable of being a hyper-competent badass", as palpable in the first part of the third season installment "Heart of Archness". Annotating on "The Man from Jupiter", Paste's Ross Bonaime avouched that Burt Reynolds' character effectively shed light onto the issues that Archer faces, as well as demonstrate a more affectionate side of him. Benjamin has been nominated for two awards for his work as Sterling Archer on the television series. His performance in "Mole Hunt" resulted in the actor being nominated for a Primetime Emmy Award for Outstanding Voice-Over Performance. Benjamin ultimately lost to actress Anne Hathaway for her performance in The Simpsons episode "Once Upon a Time in Springfield". Alongside fellow cast members Jessica Walter and Judy Greer, Benjamin was a candidate for an Annie Award in the category of Voice Acting in a Television Production—the award was given to Jeff Bennett for his work in the Nickelodeon television series The Penguins of Madagascar.
