= Lana Kane =

Fictional animated television character

- Archer character
- Promotional image
- First appearance: "Mole Hunt" (2009)
- Last appearance: Archer: Into the Cold (2023)
- Created by: Adam Reed
- Voiced by: Aisha Tyler

In-universe information
- Occupation: Intelligence agent Head of the Agency; Drug dealer (formerly); Unlicensed private investigator (formerly)
- Family: Lemuel Kane (father); Claudette Kane (mother); Unnamed sister
- Spouse: Robert (ex-husband)
- Significant others: Sterling Archer (ex-boyfriend); Cyril Figgis (ex-boyfriend); Joshua Gray (ex-boyfriend)
- Children: Abbiejean "AJ" Kane-Archer (daughter)

Lana Anthony Kane is a fictional character in the American adult animated sitcom Archer. Created by Adam Reed, she is voiced by Aisha Tyler and debuted in the series' pilot episode, "Mole Hunt", on September 17, 2009.

Lana is the top female special agent of the International Secret Intelligence Service (ISIS), a fictional New York-based intelligence agency. She serves as the series' straight woman, particularly to her ex-boyfriend and co-worker, protagonist Sterling Archer, whom she typically provides a sensible albeit short-tempered foil to. Archer's subsequent years see her take on different occupations and personae as the show experiments with new ideas, character arcs and self-contained narratives.

Lana has aspirations for advancement as a master spy and has considered positions offered by ODIN (Organization of Democratic Intelligence Networks), both at their international headquarters and as Regional Director for the Americas, although her strong views often cause friction between her and her job.

== Attributes ==
=== Background ===
Lana was pushed to succeed as a child by her parents, both college professors. But she was so scared about going to science fairs that she puked in the car. Lana got her job as an ISIS agent during a protest at a local furrier. She was about to throw red paint on Malory Archer's new fur when Malory pointed her gun at Lana's forehead. The rest of the protesters fled, including Joshua Gray, but Lana was not intimidated. Malory, inspired by Lana's bravery, gave her a job. Three weeks later, she was on her first mission in Tunisia, "killing a different man," referencing that she restructured her priorities from being a college protester (sticking it to "the man") to who she is now.

=== Personality ===
Lana is strong-willed and tough, rarely if ever allowing herself to be pushed around or demeaned. She is, however, very short-tempered and sarcastic, and she does not hesitate to use violence to resolve conflictive situations, whether it is called for or not.

Lana is a competent and deadly agent but is constantly frustrated that she is treated as the number two ISIS field agent because Archer's mother runs the agency. Like Archer, Lana is an expert in Krav Maga, in which all ISIS agents undergo training, and is usually seen carrying two Tec-9 submachine guns in shoulder holsters (her proficiency is disputed, as one example has her being able to write letters in cursive with her guns, while another episode has a former ISIS trainee mock her firing style as "spray and pray"). She drives a purple car that resembles a Living Daylights-era Aston Martin V8 Vantage.

Her liberal leanings do occasionally show, and she tends to be the most politically correct character, as well as the straight man to the antics of the rest of the staff. However, she is shown to be capable of questionable behavior, once charging every man in the ISIS office $600 to say they slept with her as a way to get revenge on her cheating ex-boyfriend Cyril, and on another occasion holding up a firefight on a space station until the other agents conceded her breasts are still perfect. She is also shown to be prone to mistakes, having once forgotten to get a receipt for a captured criminal, thus costing ISIS a massive bounty. Furthermore, in a moment of surprising insight, Cheryl accused Lana of being a hypocrite, as her history as a social activist is not enough to drive her away from ISIS, which is deep down her only true love. She is also prone to extreme acts of unnecessary violence, such as giving Cyril, whom she was dating at the time, a black eye for merely implying that she might have been jealous of a rival agent.

=== Characteristics ===
Lana is one of the most recognizable characters from Archer because of her appearance. Although she has some insecurities, every character considers her to be incredibly attractive, with even Ray Gillette willing to have sex with her, claiming that "Nobody's that gay." Lana is often said to have large hands for a woman. Ridiculing her for this characteristic is one of many long-running jokes on the show, with such comments as "man hands", "shovels" or "truckasaurus".

In flashbacks, she is shown sporting an afro, a hairstyle that, according to Archer, made her look "like Angela Davis had a love child with Sweet Lou Dunbar." She eventually straightened her hair and grew it long enough to wear it in a tied-back flip hairstyle. In season seven, she began wearing a hair weave, which she does not like the others noticing.

== Relationships ==
=== Relationship with Archer ===
Despite having a great disdain for Archer, Lana shares the closest connection with him of all the characters. They're frequently partnered together on missions, and despite all he has put her through, she still considers him a friend (Heart of Archness: Part III) and cares about him deeply.

During a firefight, both Archer and Lana reveal they are each other's beneficiaries should they die. Lana stated she was going to change that, but it's unknown if she did. Lana showed great concern for Archer when he was diagnosed with breast cancer (Stage Two) and spent the night with him out of pity. After Archer found out his cancer medication was fake, Lana begrudgingly accompanied him in his "rampage", serving as his cameraman and chauffeuse, and is also convinced into pity sex with Archer.

Lana began contemplating having a baby in Season 4. During one episode, she becomes conflicted as to who is going to be her unknowing sperm donor, Archer or Cyril, seemingly changing her mind many times. During a mission to stop a radical environmentalist marine biologist from blowing up Sealab, Lana discloses that she is pregnant, angering Cyril because he isn't the father and prompting Archer to sacrifice his scuba gear and drown so that they could escape.

In Season 6, Lana and Archer renew their relationship as Lana realizes how much more mature and caring Archer has become, even with some of his faults continuing, but she shows more trust in him, and especially enjoys the sexual connection they now have.

=== Relationship with Cyril ===
For the beginning of Season 1, Lana has a relationship with Cyril Figgis, though she seems to question the relationship at times, considering Cyril to be "clingy" (so much so, she once commented to Malory, "Saran Wrap could take a lesson."). Despite that, she stays with him, until it becomes obvious that Cyril is insecure about their relationship, egged on by Pam and Carol, who suggest Lana is still sexually attracted to Archer. This causes Cyril to constantly follow her on missions, finally frustrating Lana to where she declares them "on a break." Cyril tries to propose to Lana to prove his trust in her, but he's forced to sacrifice the engagement ring for a jury-rigged device to save her. Later, their relationship goes south again when Lana finds out that Cyril, out of his insecurity, slept with several women at ISIS, causing her to supposedly sleep with other men at ISIS (in reality, she just has each of them pay $600 to say they did), and officially ends their relationship.

In Season 4, Lana, bothered by her involuntary streak of 14 months without sex, gives in to Cyril's persistence and resumes a "carefully planned out" relationship with him. This continues until in one episode, she and Archer pose as newlyweds for a stake-out, and Cyril is yet again made insecure by Pam & Cheryl that Lana will fall for Archer again, and shadows them, and though he ends up saving them, Lana finally has enough of Cyril's lack of trust and ends their relationship again, as well as his status as a possible "donor" for her.

=== Others ===
In addition to her relationships with Archer and Cyril, Lana has also had an office tryst with Pam, partially out of pity, since no one else in the office was willing to have sex with her. Lana only agreed to do so if Pam stays quiet during it, though not so Pam doesn't tell anyone, but so Lana can pretend Pam is Alex Karras.

=== Marriage ===
In Season 11 it is revealed that while Archer was eight months into his coma, Lana met and married Robert, a billionaire philanthropist and someone who Archer notes is balding and much older than her. They had met at a charity auction at the hospital where Archer was being nursed at. This seems to have devastated Archer, who was ready to propose to Lana, pointing out that every coma dream he had, Lana was his centerpoint. Pam has commented to Archer that Lana is genuinely happy in her marriage. However, it's noted that while she's committed to staying married, cracks are starting to show. Ironic considering how much she criticized both Archer and Malory's flaws, Robert seems to be a combination of both of them. It's later shown he has many traits in common with Malory and she was unaware how many times he was married. For that matter, he's not officially divorced from the last of his three ex-wives. Robert states he lost her while on a safari.

== See also ==
List of Archer characters

Other characters

- Sterling Archer
- Cheryl Tunt
