= Archer season 1 =

Archer
- Season 1
- DVD cover
- Starring: H. Jon Benjamin; Judy Greer; Chris Parnell; Aisha Tyler; Jessica Walter
- No. of episodes: 10

Release
- Original network: FX
- Original release: September 17, 2009 – March 18, 2010

Season chronology
- Next → Season 2

The first season of the animated television series, Archer originally aired in the United States on the cable network FX. The season started on September 17, 2009, with "Mole Hunt" and ended with "Dial M for Mother" on March 18, 2010, with a total of ten episodes.

== Episodes ==
No. overall	No. in season	Title	Written by	Original release date	Prod. code	US viewers (millions)
1	1	"Mole Hunt"	Adam Reed	September 17, 2009	XAR01001	0.91
After Cyril and his mother start accusing Archer of spending company funds on personal items, Archer spreads a rumour that there is a mole, and then breaks into ISIS to alter his account records. It turns out that Krenshaw is indeed a mole, but Archer ends up shooting him.
2	2	"Training Day"	Adam Reed	January 14, 2010	XAR01002	1.82
When Archer stops an assassination attempt, his ex Lana's loins froth, so Mallory asks Archer to train Cyril so he will seem more attractive to Lana. Archer is wise though, and tries to sabotage their plan.
3	3	"Diversity Hire"	Adam Reed	January 21, 2010	XAR01004	1.23
After the death of yet another agent (due to Archer inadvertently exposing them during a mission), ISIS needs a new operative and a racial minority, and Malory hires Conway Stern (voiced by Coby Bell) to fill the position. As Conway makes an impressive splash at ISIS, he quickly draws the suspicion of Lana. Meanwhile, Archer is worried that Conway has his sights set on marrying Malory and cutting him out of her will.
4	4	"Killing Utne"	Adam Reed	January 28, 2010	XAR01003	0.87
To get a major client, Malory hires a German hit man and his twisted girlfriend to fake an assassination attempt during a dinner party, unaware the duo have been hired to really kill the man.
5	5	"Honeypot"	Adam Reed & Tony Carbone	February 4, 2010	XAR01005	0.62
Archer has to seduce an enemy agent to recover incriminating video footage of his mother. The enemy agent however is a man. Special guest stars: Thomas Lennon as Charles and Ron Perlman as Ramon Limon
6	6	"Skorpio"	Adam Reed	February 11, 2010	XAR01006	0.76
Archer and Lana go on a mission to stop an arms dealer while Malory has a tryst with her KGB lover and reveals he may be Archer's father.
7	7	"Skytanic"	Adam Reed	February 18, 2010	XAR01007	0.87
While on the maiden voyage of the luxury rigid airship Excelsior, a bomb threat requires the attention of the ISIS agents. Malory eventually admits that she called in a false bomb threat as an excuse so she could get free tickets. Just as Lana calls Archer to tell him this news, he ironically finds a real bomb in the cargo hold.
8	8	"The Rock"	Adam Reed & Boswell Cocker	March 4, 2010	XAR01008	0.72
When ODIN steals a contract away, Malory sends Archer and Lana to steal a priceless diamond as payback. However, the mission (and Cyril's plan to propose to Lana) are upset when the ISIS workers decide to go on strike for better pay. Special guest star: Jeffrey Tambor as Len Trexler
9	9	"Job Offer"	Adam Reed	March 11, 2010	XAR01009	1.08
ODIN offers Lana a job but Archer believes the offer is for him and accepts after he and Malory have a falling-out. It seems great at first, until his mother drunkenly puts out a burn notice on him. Special guest star: Jeffrey Tambor as Len Trexler
10	10	"Dial M for Mother"	Adam Reed	March 18, 2010	XAR01010	0.76
Archer is kidnapped and implanted with a mind control chip which malfunctions and causes him to try and kill Malory. Meanwhile, Lana tries to teach Cyril a lesson after Cyril cheats on her with several women (including with Cheryl) while Pam attempts to have sex with one of the co-workers.

== Home media ==
Archer: The Complete Season One
Set details	Special features	
10 episodes; 2-disc set; 16:9 aspect ratio; Languages: English; Subtitles; English; French; Spanish	Original Unaired Pilot; Unaired Network Promo; The Making Of Archer: 3D; The Making Of Archer: Animation; The Making Of Archer: Art Direction; The Making Of Archer: Backgrounds; The Making Of Archer: Illustration; The Making Of Archer: Storyboards; Deleted Scenes; Pilot episodes of Louie and The League	
DVD release dates
Region 1	Region 2	Region 4
December 28, 2010	May 3, 2011	March 3, 2011
