= Training Day (Archer) =

- Archer episode
- Archer threatens to eject from his car while being fired at by an unknown pursuer.
- Episode no.: Season 1 Episode 2
- Directed by: Mack Williams
- Written by: Adam Reed
- Production code: XAR01002
- Original air date: January 14, 2010

Episode chronology
← Previous "Mole Hunt"	Next → "Diversity Hire"
- Archer (season 1)

"Training Day" is the second episode of the animated comedy Archer. It was written by Archer creator and co-executive producer Adam Reed and directed by Mack Williams. In the episode, Archer's mother Malory assigns her son the task of training Cyril to be an agent. Meanwhile, secretary Cheryl and human resources representative Pam take advantage of Malory being temporarily blinded by an allergic reaction.

"Training Day" was produced at Floyd County Productions and animated at Radical Axis studio in Atlanta, over the course of approximately one month. FX had initially planned on airing the series alongside the fifth season of It's Always Sunny in Philadelphia in 2009, but production constraints led to it being pushed back to January 2010. The episode features cultural references to the films Rain Man and James Bond, and stand-up comedian and actor Dane Cook. In its original broadcast, the episode was met with 1.8 million viewers and positive reviews.

== Plot ==
After Archer recklessly foils an Irish terrorist's attempt to assassinate a British nobleman, Malory begins to suspect that Lana's feelings for her son are resurfacing. Hoping to readjust Lana's desires so they are steered towards her current boyfriend, Cyril, she asks Archer to train him to be a field agent. Archer is wise to their scheme though, and tries to set Cyril up to fail to sabotage his relationship with Lana, Archer's ex. At one point, Cyril inquiries about Archer’s lack of ethics, and ease of deception. To which Archer’s replies “lying is, like, 95% of what I do.” One of his sessions involves trying to kill an assassin (portrayed by Archer's butler, Woodhouse) and using a dance partner (played by a prostitute Archer has befriended) as a human shield. During the session, however, Cyril accidentally poisons the prostitute and both he and Archer pronounce her deceased.

The pair put the prostitute in Archer's trunk and drive off, hoping to dispose of the body in an undisclosed location. On the way, however, Archer reveals he is aware of Malory's plan and has been attempting to discourage Cyril from becoming a field agent, presumably due to his own feelings for Lana, and had orchestrated the whole fiasco to this end (revealing the prostitute was merely tranquilized). At this point, the car is rammed by a pursuing vehicle. Cyril believes this is part of Archer's hoax, until their pursuer opens fire on them. In a true show of his character, Archer threatens to eject from the car and leave the hysterical Cyril behind. Their mystery attacker then ceases fire and reveals herself to be Lana, who has discovered Archer's assignment and decided to put a stop to it. Despite Cyril's concern about being caught with a dead hooker, Lana reveals she is only upset he felt the need to keep secrets from her, so she punishes Cyril by forcing him to buy interracial pornography from "the sweet old Korean lady" at the video store. Archer releases the prostitute in the trunk after Cyril and Lana depart, who reveals she was not in on the plan. Archer is forced to not only pay her obscene amounts of money as collateral, but also give her his car, leaving him stranded.

Meanwhile, Malory becomes temporally blinded after having an allergic reaction to zucchini. Seeing this as an opportunity to help themselves, secretary Cheryl and human resources representative Pam hack into the ISIS computer mainframe from Malory's office and alter their files, allowing them better health care and other perks they can not afford themselves. The whole time, Malory rants about how disgruntled she is about her own and others' life choices.

== Production ==
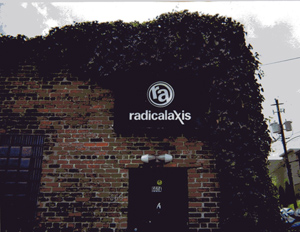
"Training Day" was animated at Radical Axis over the course of approximately one month.

"Training Day" was written by Archer creator and co-executive producer Adam Reed, while the series' animation director Mack Williams directed it. In 2009, FX network had officially greenlit production of the series, ordering six episodes and an additional four scripts. Over the course of approximately one month, "Training Day" was produced at Reed's Floyd County Productions studio in Atlanta, Georgia, and animated at the Radical Axis Studio, also located in Atlanta.

FX originally planned on pairing Archer with the fifth season of the network's situation comedy It's Always Sunny in Philadelphia on Thursday nights in the Fall. However, the network learned of the month-long production period needed to create the necessary six episodes, and realized that there was not enough time to have all of the episodes ready before Philadelphia began its new season. FX instead decided to release a sneak airing of the pilot episode "Mole Hunt" on September 17, 2009, without any promotion or announcement, and began broadcast of the first season with "Training Day" on January 14, 2010.

== Cultural references ==
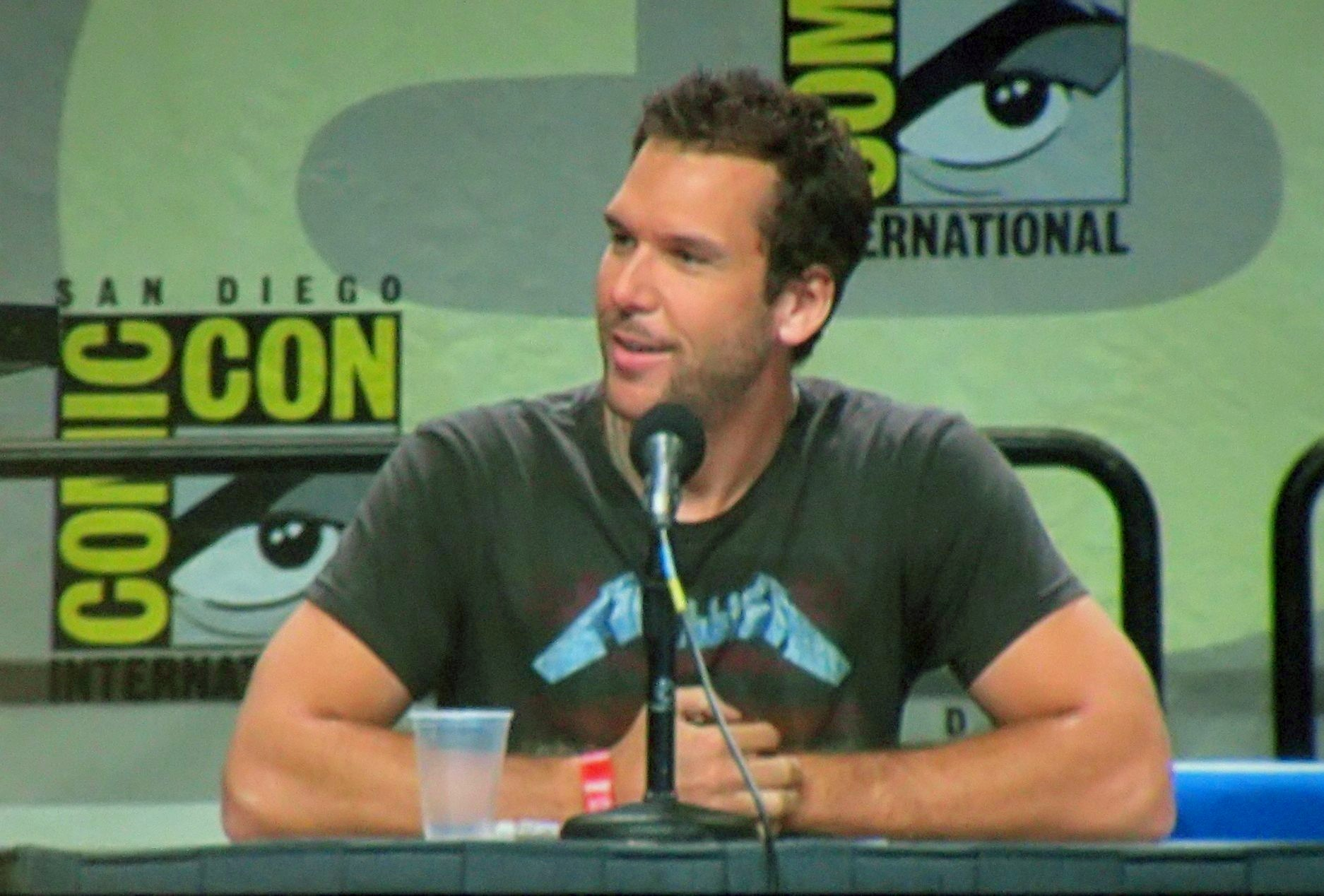
Stand-up comedian and actor Dane Cook is disparaged in the episode.

The episode featured multiple cultural references. Cyril asks Archer if he'll get to learn karate. Archer replies that karate is the Dane Cook of martial arts. Archer explains that ISIS agents get trained by a former member of Mossad to use Krav Maga, an eclectic hand-to-hand combat system developed in Israel.

After Trinette is accidentally poisoned by Cyril, Archer argues his point of reasoning by introducing "Chekhov's Gun." It is believed that Chekhov once stated that if a gun is introduced in the first act, then we should expect it to go off in the last act. Thus, inviting Woodhouse to comment that Archer's reference was woefully esoteric.

While Archer and Cyril are being shot at by an unknown vehicle behind them, Archer refers to Cyril as "Rain Man," a 1988 drama film starring Tom Cruise and Dustin Hoffman. Cyril believes that Archer is calling himself a better spy than James Bond from the James Bond film series, to which Archer pronounces "I don’t like to invite that comparison but... yeah, basically." Several critics have noted satirical comparisons between Archer and the Bond films. Reed, himself, based the Archer character on Bond, perceiving Bond as misogynistic and racist.

== Reception ==
"'Training Day' was a prime example of how ridiculously rapid-fire the conversations can get. Archer's oddly specific "hypothetical" situation to explain his underwear gun was particularly great."

— Annie Wu, TV Squad

In its original broadcast on FX, "Training Day" was watched by 1.8 million viewers, according to Nielsen ratings. 1.2 million of these viewers were aged between the ages of 18 and 49, the core demographic for Archer. A re-airing of the pilot episode "Mole Hunt" preceded it and attracted a slightly lower number of viewers, with 1.4 million viewers, only 950,000 being between 18 and 49.

"Training Day" received generally positive reviews from television critics. Annie Wu applauded the episode in her review for TV Squad. Wu dispensed that the best part was the writing, and acted as "a prime example of how ridiculously rapid-fire the conversations can get." She singled out the scene where Archer gives an "oddly specific" situation as to when he would utilize a gun hidden in his underwear. Wu opined that she "loved" Jessica Walter's performance as Malory, declaring that she "wins this episode" with lines such as "Immigrants! That's how they do, y'know. Just drive around, listening to raps and shooting all the jobs."

Brian Zoromski of IGN rewarded the episode a 9.0 out of 10, signifying it as "Outstanding." Zoromski called the voice cast "absolutely excellent," writing that H. Jon Benjamin's delivery as Archer was "brilliantly over-the-top, from his drunken outburst and almost-accidental stopping of a terrorist, to his education of all things spy-related," and noted that both the series satirical themes and character development were "alternately obvious and subtle" and "Archer's biggest strength." Salon.com's Heather Havrilesky called the exchange between Archer and Cyril concerning the latter's martial arts training a "[zinger that flies] by pretty quickly."
