= Gesundheit! (video game) =

2011 video game

- Developer: Revolutionary Concepts
- Publisher: Konami
- Platforms: iOS, Android, Mac OS
- Release: iOS; August 3, 2011
- Genre: Puzzle
- Mode: Single player

Gesundheit! is a puzzle video game developed by Australian studio Revolutionary Concepts and published by Konami for iOS in 2011 and Android in 2014. The game was removed from the app stores in an unknown year, possibly between 2016-2018.

== Gameplay ==
In Gesundheit! the player plays as a green pig with a cold, being able to shoot snot projectiles out their nose. To beat a level, you need to lure monsters into traps by using your snot as bait, while collecting 3 stars per level that can unlock later levels

== Reception ==
Reception

Aggregate score
Aggregator	Score
Metacritic	84/100

Review scores
Publication	Score
IGN	9.5/10
Pocket Gamer	3/5
TouchArcade	5/5

"Gesundheit! is one of the rare games for iOS that I think everyone should play." 9.5/10 (IGN)

"The sort of experience that shows off the wonderful things people can create for this platform. Don't miss it." (Touch-Arcade)
