= Winnie the Pooh (2011 film) =

Disney animated film

- Theatrical release poster
- Directed by: Stephen Anderson; Don Hall
- Story by: Stephen Anderson; Clio Chiang; Don Dougherty; Don Hall; Kendelle Hoyer; Brian Kesinger; Nicole Mitchell; Jeremy Spears
- Based on: Winnie-the-Pooh by: A. A. Milne; E. H. Shepard
- Produced by: Peter Del Vecho; Clark Spencer
- Starring: John Cleese; Jim Cummings; Bud Luckey; Craig Ferguson; Jack Boulter; Travis Oates; Kristen Anderson-Lopez; Wyatt Dean Hall; Tom Kenny; Huell Howser
- Cinematography: Julio Macat (live-action scenes)
- Edited by: Lisa Linder Silver
- Music by: Henry Jackman
- Production company: Walt Disney Animation Studios
- Distributed by: Walt Disney Studios Motion Pictures (Note: Distributed under the Walt Disney Pictures banner.)
- Release dates: April 6, 2011 (Belgium); July 15, 2011 (United States)
- Running time: 63 minutes
- Country: United States
- Language: English
- Budget: $30 million
- Box office: $50.1 million

Winnie the Pooh is a 2011 American animated musical comedy film produced by Walt Disney Animation Studios. It is based on the book series by A. A. Milne and E. H. Shepard and is a revival of Disney's Winnie the Pooh franchise. It was directed by Stephen Anderson and Don Hall. Jim Cummings reprises his voice roles as Winnie the Pooh and Tigger, and Travis Oates reprises his voice role as Piglet. The voice cast also includes Tom Kenny, Craig Ferguson, Bud Luckey (in his final film role), and Kristen Anderson-Lopez. In the film, which is narrated by John Cleese, the residents of the Hundred Acre Wood embark on a quest to save Christopher Robin from an imaginary culprit, while Pooh deals with a hunger for honey.

The film was first announced in November 2008 with Disney Animation's chief creative officer John Lasseter stating that Disney wanted to create a film that would "transcend generations". It was planned to feature five stories from the A. A. Milne books, before the final cut ended up drawing inspiration from three stories. The film features six songs by Kristen Anderson-Lopez and Robert Lopez and a score composed by Henry Jackman, as well as a rendition of the Sherman Brothers' "Winnie the Pooh" theme song performed by actress and musician Zooey Deschanel.

Winnie the Pooh premiered at the Roy E. Disney Animation Building in Burbank, California on July 10, 2011, and was released in the United States on July 15. The film grossed $50.1 million on a $30 million budget and received generally positive reviews from critics, who praised the animation style but criticized its short runtime. As of 2026, it is Disney Animation's last traditionally animated theatrical feature film.

== Plot ==
Set inside a storybook, the film follows the adventures of Christopher Robin and his friends, including Winnie the Pooh, who live in the Hundred Acre Wood and can interact directly with the book's narrator and text.

One morning, Pooh discovers that he has run out of honey. While searching for more, he visits Eeyore and notices that Eeyore's tail has gone missing. A contest is later held, offering a pot of honey as a prize for any participant who can find a suitable replacement tail for Eeyore, but every attempt fails.

Later, Pooh arrives at Christopher Robin's house to ask for honey, but finds him gone, and a note left behind. As Pooh shows the note to his friends, Owl reads it and concludes from the words written that Christopher Robin has been abducted by a creature called the "Backson". Rabbit comes up with a plan to trap the Backson by leaving a trail of items leading to a pit.

Elsewhere, Tigger, who is unhappy with Rabbit's plan, decides to hunt down and battle the Backson on his own. He soon finds that Eeyore was accidentally left behind by the gang during their plot and decides to take the donkey under his wing. While training Eeyore, Tigger dresses up as the Backson to teach Eeyore how to fight. Eeyore eventually abandons Tigger and hides underwater, where he discovers an anchor and decides to use it as a replacement tail.

While struggling to follow through with Rabbit's plan, Pooh falls into the Backson pit after finding an empty honey pot above it. Reuniting with Eeyore, Rabbit's party tries to use Eeyore's anchor to free Pooh, but its weight knocks everyone but Piglet into the pit. Piglet heads towards Christopher Robin's house to find a rope to rescue everyone, but he gets frightened off after spotting Tigger in his Backson costume. A chase ends with both of them falling in the pit along with letters from the book's text, which Pooh uses to build a ladder for everyone to climb out.

Christopher Robin returns and clarifies that the letter he left actually said he had gone to school and would be back soon. Pooh continues his search for honey. He visits Owl's house, where he discovers that Owl has been using Eeyore's tail as a bell pull, unaware of who it belonged to. Owl allows Pooh to take the tail, and offers him a pot of honey, but Pooh declines the offer and promptly returns Eeyore's tail. As a reward for this act of selflessness, Christopher Robin declares Pooh the winner of the contest and presents him with an enormous pot of honey.

In a post-credits scene, the Backson is revealed to be real, but surprisingly friendly. He discovers the items left by Pooh and his friends and ends up falling into their pit.

== Voice cast ==
- Jim Cummings as:
  - Winnie the Pooh, a kind-hearted anthropomorphic teddy bear who loves honey. Mark Henn served as the supervising animator for Pooh.
  - Tigger, a brave hyperactive non-stop bouncing tiger. Andreas Deja served as the supervising animator for Tigger.
- Travis Oates as Piglet, a small cowardly pig and Pooh's best friend. Bruce W. Smith served as the supervising animator for Piglet.
- Bud Luckey as Eeyore, an old miserable grey donkey who loses his tail during the events of the movie. Randy Haycock served as the supervising animator for Eeyore. (This was Luckey's final film role before his retirement in 2014 and death from a stroke in 2018.)
- Huell Howser as Backson, the mysterious creature who was thought to have kidnapped Christopher Robin. Eric Goldberg served as the supervising animator for the Backson. (This was also Howser's final film role before his retirement in 2012 and death from prostate cancer in January 2013.)
- Jack Boulter as Christopher Robin, a young British human boy and one of Pooh's best friends. Henn also served as the supervising animator for Christopher Robin.
- Tom Kenny as Rabbit, a pretentious and strait-laced rabbit who loves planting vegetables in his garden. Goldberg also served as the supervising animator for Rabbit.
- Kristen Anderson-Lopez as Kanga, a female kangaroo and Roo's mother. Smith also served as the supervising animator for Kanga.
- Wyatt Dean Hall as Roo, Kanga's excitable joey. Smith again served as the supervising animator for Roo.
- Craig Ferguson as Owl, an elderly British-accented owl who is not as wise as he thinks and tells very long and boring stories about his family. Dale Baer served as the supervising animator for Owl.
- John Cleese as Mr. Narrator

== Production ==
Walt Disney Animation Studios' chief creative officer John Lasseter first approached Stephen Anderson and Don Hall in November 2008 about making a new Winnie the Pooh film for theaters, with the two becoming enthusiastic at the idea and accepting the project. In 2009, Lasseter, Anderson and Hall viewed the classic Winnie the Pooh feature shorts and films to figure out how to make the title character culturally relevant.

Following a trip to Ashdown Forest in Sussex, South East England to explore the location of A. A. Milne's original stories, the filmmakers enlisted Burny Mattinson, a Disney veteran who worked as the key animator on the 1974 short Winnie the Pooh and Tigger Too, to serve as lead storyboard artist for the film, with Anderson and Hall directing. After seeing all the feature films about Winnie the Pooh, Mattinson thought he could use Milne's story "In which Eeyore loses his tail and Pooh finds one" as the basic idea for the plot. Mattinson's five-minute pitch for the sequence where Eeyore loses his tail is credited with convincing Disney executives to make the film a feature-length work instead of a featurette. Regarding the decision to use hand-drawn (traditional) animation in lieu of computer-generated imagery (CGI), Anderson stated that "If this were a fully CG-animated [sic] and rendered and lit Pooh, it just wouldn't feel right. We would be doing the characters a real disservice." Many of the animation staff from The Princess and the Frog (2009) were brought in to work on Winnie the Pooh, as the two films involved traditional animation, and additional clean up/inbetween animation and digital ink and paint was provided by Yowza Animation, Inc. The production would also use the same software utilized for Princess and the Frog, Toon Boom Animation's Harmony, to digitally ink and paint the drawings.

Originally, the film was supposed to feature five stories from the A. A. Milne books, but the final cut ended up drawing inspiration from three stories. Lasseter had also announced that Rabbit's friends and relatives would be in the film, but their scene was ultimately deleted. In an interview with ABC 4, Ken Sansom was asked about voicing Rabbit in the film, he stated, "I'm not sure." He was replaced by Tom Kenny, although Sansom claimed he was still under contract.

== Release ==
The film was released on April 6, 2011 in Belgium; April 11 in Germany; and on April 15 in the United Kingdom. It was released on July 15, 2011, in the United States.

=== Short films ===
The film was preceded by the animated short The Ballad of Nessie, which tells the story of how the Loch Ness Monster and her best friend MacQuack (a rubber duck) came to live in the loch they now call home. In some international screenings, the episode "Cubby's Goldfish" from the Disney Junior series Jake and the Never Land Pirates was aired instead.

=== Home media ===
The film was first released as number 51 in the Animated Classics range on Blu-ray, DVD, and digital download on October 25, 2011. The releases included animated shorts The Ballad of Nessie and Mini Adventures of Winnie the Pooh: "Pooh's Balloon," as well as deleted scenes.

== Reception ==
=== Critical response ===
On the review aggregator website Rotten Tomatoes, 90% of 133 critics' reviews are positive, with an average rating of 7.2/10. The website's consensus reads: "Short, nostalgic, and gently whimsical, Winnie the Pooh offers young audiences—and their parents—a sweetly traditional family treat." According to Metacritic, which assigns a weighted average score out of 100 to reviews from mainstream critics, the film received an average score of 74 out of 100, based on 26 critics, indicating "generally favorable reviews". CinemaScore polls reported that the average grade moviegoers gave the film an "A−" on an A+ to F scale.

Gary Goldstein of the Los Angeles Times says the film "proves a fitting tribute to one of the last century's most enduring children's tales." A. O. Scott of The New York Times praised the film for being able to charm children and parents alike. Roger Ebert, giving it 3 stars out of 4, wrote in his review, "In a time of shock-value 3-D animation and special effects, the look of the film is gentle and pleasing. It was hand-animated, I'm told, and the backgrounds use a subtle and reassuring watercolor style. It's a nightmare-proof experience for even the youngest viewers."

While Platform Online stated that Winnie the Pooh's "hand-drawn animation is such a welcome relief," it found the film's run-time length to be more of an issue, which it stated "At just 70 minutes, even aiming at kids this could have been longer – Pixar have been pushing films well over 90 minutes for years now, and it's clear the children can handle it. Just as you really get into the film it's over, and you're left wanting more."

=== Box office ===
In North America, Winnie the Pooh earned $7.8 million in its opening weekend from 2,405 single-screen locations, averaging about $3,267 per venue, and ranking sixth for the weekend. The film closed on September 22, 2011, with a final domestic gross of $26.7 million, with the opening weekend making up 29.44% of the final gross. Among its overseas grosses, Winnie the Pooh had its largest gross in Japan with $4.13 million; the country has had a long-standing affection for the character of Winnie the Pooh. Other international grosses include $1.33 million in Germany, $1.29 million in Poland, $1.18 million in the UK and $1.14 million in Russia. Overall, it made $23.4 million overseas, bringing the worldwide gross to $50.1 million over a budget of $30 million.

=== Accolades ===
Accolades received by Winnie the Pooh
| Award | Category | Recipient(s) | Result | Ref. |
|---|---|---|---|---|
| Annie Awards | Animated Effects in an Animated Production | Dan Lund | Nominated | |
| Annie Awards | Character Animation in a Feature Production | Andreas Deja | Nominated | |
| Annie Awards | Character Animation in a Feature Production | Mark Henn | Nominated | |
| Annie Awards | Annie Award for Directing in a Feature Production | Don Hall & Stephen Anderson | Nominated | |
| Annie Awards | Music in a Feature Production | Zooey Deschanel, Kristen Anderson-Lopez, Henry Jackman, Robert Lopez | Nominated | |
| Annie Awards | Production Design in a Feature Production | Paul Felix | Nominated | |
| Annie Awards | Storyboarding in a Feature Production | Jeremy Spears | Won | |
| Annie Awards | Annie Award for Writing in a Feature Production | Brian Kesinger, Kendelle Hoyer, Don Dougherty, Clio Chiang, Don Hall, Stephen Anderson, Nicole Mitchell, Jeremy Spears | Nominated | |
| Chicago Film Critics Association Awards | Best Animated Film | Don Hall and Stephen Anderson | Nominated | |
| Online Film Critics Society | Best Animated Film | Winnie The Pooh | Nominated | |
| San Diego Film Critics | Best Animated Film | Stephen Anderson and Don Hall | Nominated | |
| Washington D. C. Area Film Critics Association | Best Animated Feature | Don Hall and Stephen Anderson | Nominated | |

== Soundtrack ==
In order to search for songwriters, Anderson and Hall sent visuals to five songwriting teams, and the team liked the demos returned by Robert Lopez and Kristen Anderson-Lopez, eventually backing them on board. The Lopezes' previously worked with John Lasseter and Disney music executive Chris Montan on the theme park musical version of Finding Nemo. They wrote seven tracks for Winnie the Pooh. Zooey Deschanel performed three songs for the film, including a take on the Winnie the Pooh theme song, "A Very Important Thing to Do" and an original end-credit song "So Long", which was written by Deschanel and performed with She & Him bandmate M. Ward. The film was scored by Henry Jackman, with additional music by Christopher Willis. The soundtrack was released on July 12, 2011.

== Other versions ==
The Walt Disney Company released five versions for the song "Welcome to my world" featuring Edyta Bartosiewicz for the Polish version, Witaj w moim świecie (Welcome to my world), Anca Sigartău for the Romanian version, Bun Venit în Lumea mea (Welcome to My World), Zséda for the Hungarian version, Az én világom (My world), Evgenia Vlasova for the Ukrainian version, Мій світ (My world), and Beloslava for the Bulgarian version, Добре дошъл в моя свят (Dobre doshŭl v moya svyat).

== Stage adaptation ==
A musical theatre adaptation, titled Disney's Winnie the Pooh KIDS, uses additional music from Will Van Dyke and additional lyrics and scenes by Cheryl Davies.

== See also ==
- Winnie the Pooh (franchise)
