= Brian Kesinger =

American illustrator, author and animator (born 1978)

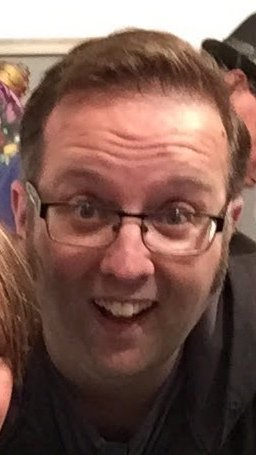
- Kesinger in 2019
- Born: May 4, 1978 (age 48); Los Angeles, California, U.S.
- Occupations: Author, animator and American illustrator

Brian Kesinger (born May 4, 1978) is an American illustrator, author and Emmy award-winning animation artist who has worked at Disney for 20+ years. His personal works are rooted in steampunk aesthetics inspired by his work on Atlantis: The Lost Empire.

== Career ==
He joined the Walt Disney Animation Studios in Burbank, California, becoming the youngest animator in the history of the company, at age 18. Starting as a layout artist for Tarzan, his career with Disney has filled many positions, ranging from visual development to story artist.

In 2000, Kesinger was responsible for layout and background design for the Walt Disney Animation Studios film Atlantis: The Lost Empire, which inspired his appreciation for steampunk aesthetics. He was also involved with other animated films like Treasure Planet, Winnie the Pooh, Tarzan, Tangled, Chicken Little, Home on the Range, Bolt and Meet the Robinsons.

In 2011, he received the Annie Award for his story work on Disney's Prep & Landing: Naughty vs. Nice.

In 2012, Kesinger voiced the Mortal Kombat character Kano in Wreck-It Ralph.

In 2023, Kesinger also worked on the Netflix animated action drama series Blue Eye Samurai, for which he was awarded an Emmy.

Kesinger published his first illustrated book Walking Your Octopus: A Guide to the Domesticated Cephalopod. Thirty full-page illustrations portray a woman named Victoria and her pet octopus Otto conducting various activities together. He plans to produce a full-length film featuring Otto and Victoria's adventures.

Kesinger is also known for comics styled like Calvin and Hobbes featuring Kylo Ren and Darth Vader.
