= Archer season 14 =

Archer
- Season 14
- No. of episodes: 11

Release
- Original network: FXX
- Original release: August 30 – December 17, 2023

Series chronology
- ← Previous; Season 13 Next → Archer: Into the Cold

The fourteenth and final season of the animated television series Archer, created by Adam Reed, aired from FXX on August 30 to October 11, 2023. Following the announcement that the series was ending, a three-part series finale produced apart from rest of the season, Archer: Into the Cold, aired on December 17, 2023.

== Production ==
The season originally contained eight episodes, featuring Natalie Dew as a new main cast member, Zara Khan, appearing in seven of the initially planned eight episodes, and credited as a special guest star. Two days after the final episode of the season aired, a three-part series finale titled Archer: Into the Cold was announced, which aired on December 17, 2023, with Dew, Christian Slater (as Slater), Dave Willis (as Barry Dylan), and Ona Grauer (as Katya Kazanova) promoted to the main cast. On that date of the finale, series executive producer Casey Willis confirmed the series had been cancelled, with the character of Zara Khan having been introduced with plans for a three-season arc, stating that they "did not have a good handle on how we should go out. And we did not have that much time to figure it out", with Into the Cold having been quickly produced after production on the fourteenth season had ended, considered separate from the fourteenth season itself.

== Episodes ==
No. overall	No. in season	Title	Directed by	Written by	Original release date	Prod. code	US viewers (millions)
Season
135	1	"The Anglerfish Stratagem"	Pierre Cerrato	Mark Ganek	August 30, 2023	XAR014001	0.28
Lana Kane as the new head of the agency assigns Archer, Ray and Pam to work with Interpol agent, Zara Khan, to take down the Vanguard, a crew of thieves.
136	2	"30 for 30"	Kim Feigenbaum	Matt Roller	August 30, 2023	XAR014002	0.25
Archer, Pam, Ray, and Zara are captured by the thieves know as the Vanguard. Zara and Archer argue about who is the best agent and who is best at making plans. They compete over how many enemies they can take out. In the end, Zara joins the team.
137	3	"Plaque Removal"	Matt Thompson	Asha Michelle Wilson	September 6, 2023	XAR014003	0.22
The team are hired to protect an artifact being moved between a British museum and storage. A smuggler steals the artifact with the intent to return it to its country of origin. Lana has a moral crisis over this, as the client can help AJ get into a good school, but eventually they team up with the smuggler to return the artifact.
138	4	"Chill Barry"	Omaka Schultz	Mark Ganek	September 13, 2023	XAR014004	0.15
Barry returns, this time with his mind inside a mini-fridge. Evil Barry has also returned and Good Barry and the agency team up to stop him. They defeat Evil Barry by dropping him into a vat of acid.
139	5	"Keys Open Doors"	Justin Wagner	Miles Woods	September 20, 2023	XAR014005	0.17
Zara takes off the next mission for a "self-care" day forcing Lana back into the field. The mission is to destroy a cocaine processing plant; however, the crew lose the detonator and instead take up jobs in the local town against Lana's wishes.
140	6	"Face Off"	Megan Johnson	Matt Roller	September 27, 2023	XAR014006	0.15
Lana decides to stop paying the many bribes Malory used to, which leads to major fallout in the city. The rest of the team infiltrates a plastic surgery hospital where Archer becomes melancholic after x-rays show his body is badly damaged from his life as a spy. However, he ultimately decides he is the luckiest person alive and can still act as he always has.
141	7	"Mission Out of Control Room"	Casey Willis	Asha Michelle Wilson	October 4, 2023	XAR014007	0.13
Lana gets a fancy new communication system to control missions from afar. The episode takes the form of body camera footage of a mission as the team is split into pairs of two around the globe to take down an internet black market site with three servers. Lana organizes from the control room, but the new system does not lead to greater efficiency. In the end, the normal chaos leads to the team shutting down the site.
142	8	"Breaking Fabian"	Stephen Slesinski	Matt Roller	October 11, 2023	XAR014008	0.19
Drones start killing former IIA agents and the team goes to see the incarcerated Fabian to deactivate them while Lana and Cyril are summoned to the UN. After the team get Fabian out of prison, former IIA agents and the drones try to kill them. The team evades the agents and successfully deactivate the drones, in the process Archer cuts off Fabian's hand. The UN rules to disband private spy agencies.
Series finale
143	9	Archer: Into the Cold	Pierre Cerrato & Casey Willis	Mark Ganek	December 17, 2023	XARR14009	0.27
144	10	Archer: Into the Cold	Pierre Cerrato & Casey Willis	Mark Ganek	December 17, 2023	XARR14010	0.27
145	11	Archer: Into the Cold	Pierre Cerrato & Casey Willis	Mark Ganek	December 17, 2023	XARR14011	0.27
Part 1: As the UN prepares to vote to ban private spy agencies, the team is in Brazil to retrieve a stolen bunker-buster bomb. The team successfully steals back the bomb; however, when they hand it over to the C.I.A. it turns out to be Slater, who is now a rogue agent. Sterling nearly stops him, but Katya appears and shoots him. Part 2: At a black-site, Sterling is tortured by Boris, and Katya reveals that the plan is to restart the Cold War. Sterling escapes and tells the team he is in Sochi. The team arrives and investigates possible targets at a casino. They discover that the plan is to blow up a dam to flood the town and kill a group of Russian and Chinese officials, blaming the Americans. Katya, in a letter, offers Archer the chance to join her and be forever relevant by returning to the golden age of old school spy craft. However, Archer decides to be loyal to his team. Part 3: The team tries to stop Slater and Katya from blowing up the dam. They reconnect Barry to a robot-body to fight Katya, but his body is a miniature and Katya beats the crew. She is then betrayed by Slater. The team comes together to escape and evacuate the town, with Slater losing a fight to Archer and falling off the dam as the bomb goes off. Despite saving the world, the UN votes to ban private spies. Three months later, Archer is a rogue freelance spy and Lana gets an offer to track him down. She tells Archer this and they have a nice conversation about their past, and Archer sets back off into the world with Pam by his side.

== Reception ==
Season 14 received positive reviews from critics. On review aggregator website Rotten Tomatoes, the season received a 100% approval rating with an average score of 8.8/10 based on 10 reviews.
