= Mole Hunt =

- Archer episode
- Malory interrupts Archer's torture training exercise.
- Episode no.: Season 1 Episode 1
- Directed by: Mack Williams
- Written by: Adam Reed
- Production code: AR01001
- Original air date: September 17, 2009

Episode chronology
← Previous —	Next → "Training Day"
- Archer (season 1)

"Mole Hunt" is the pilot episode of American animated sitcom Archer. The episode premiered on September 17, 2009.

In the episode, suave yet rude and belligerent spy Sterling Archer, prompted by questions regarding his expense account, breaks into the mainframe computer of his organization ISIS and inadvertently discovers a mole in the organization. The episode was written by Archer creator and co-executive producer, Adam Reed, and directed by Mack Williams. It was produced at Floyd County Productions and animated at Radical Axis Studio in Atlanta, over the course of approximately one month.

The FX Network officially greenlit the series in August 2009 for six episodes—along with an additional four scripts—and planned on airing it alongside the fifth season of It's Always Sunny in Philadelphia. However, because of production time constraints, the network was forced to push the official series run to January 2010 and changed Philadelphia's paired series to The League, but aired the special sneak preview of this episode following the season premiere of Philadelphia on September 17, 2009, without promoting it or listing it on channel listings.

"Mole Hunt" attracted 1.4 million viewers, with 950,000 between the ages of 18 and 49. The episode received generally favorable reviews from television critics, who noted that despite its raunchiness, it contained sharp dialogue and quick wit. H. Jon Benjamin received a Primetime Emmy Award nomination for Outstanding Voice-Over Performance for his performance as Archer in the episode.

== Plot ==
Sterling Archer, a suave agent from the spy organization ISIS, partakes in a torture training exercise, but causes it to be terminated after complaining about fellow agent Krenshaw's fake-torture tactics. The following day, while trying to get members of the organization to smell his dry cleaning due to its strangely curry-like odor, he is called into the office of Malory, his mother and boss, where he is chastised for misusing his ISIS-run expense account. He seeks assistance from Cyril Figgis, a member of the organization and his ex-girlfriend Lana Kane’s current boyfriend, to clear his account, but he refuses. Attempts to get access to accounts with a made-up "Mole Hunt" also meet with failure, because only section heads (Krenshaw, Cyril Figgis in accounting and Pamela Poovey in human resources) have access to the mainframe, and none of them wants to help him. Archer tries getting secretary Cheryl to leave the mainframe open that night, allowing Archer to easily slip in and clear his account, but she too denies his request.

Without any outside options, Archer is forced to manually break into ISIS's mainframe. Though he initially thinks that this will be an extremely difficult task, he discovers that actual security is appallingly terrible and he easily figures out the password to hack his account after the first try. While trying to transfer all of his excess expenses from his account to Krenshaw, the agent enters the room and holds a gun up to Archer's head. He reveals that he is actually a Russian spy named Kremenski and fears the agency has started to realize that he is a mole, so he plans on stealing $50,000 from Archer's account and fleeing from the country. Just then, however, Lana arrives and pulls a gun on Kremenski. She and Archer begin to argue and the mole is able to escape.

They pursue him outside, where Cyril and Malory have already arrived. Kremenski grabs Malory and threatens to kill her if they do not let him leave; Archer tries to turn the tables on him by grabbing Lana and threatening to do the same, but Kremenski does not care about her well being. When Lana proclaims that Archer is getting an erection (caused by picturing Malory being dead), Kremenski lets go of Malory in disgust, allowing Archer room to shoot him several times in his chest and once in the head, killing him.

Despite his previous actions of breaking into ISIS and hacking the mainframe, Archer is excused from his expenses after Cyril comes to the assumption that Kremenski had been stealing from Archer's account the whole time. Malory notes that she would have known if there was a mole at ISIS, her earlier phone call interrupted by Archer, was shown to have been with Nikolai Jakov, head of the KGB. She changes the subject when questioned, and rather complains that someone left donuts on the floor attracting ants.

== Production ==
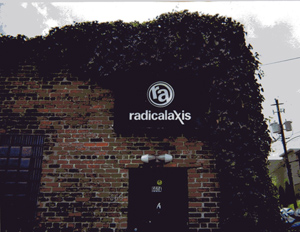
"Mole Hunt" was animated at Radical Axis over the course of approximately one month.

"Mole Hunt" was written by Archer creator and executive producer Adam Reed, while the series' animation director Mack Williams directed it. Reed had been known for his creation of several Adult Swim animated television programs that he worked on with Archer co-executive producer Matt Thompson, such as Sealab 2021 and Frisky Dingo. In 2008, while walking along the Via de la Plata in Spain, Reed conceived the concept of Archer. Being a longtime "rabid fan" of FX Network and its original programming, he pitched the concept to the network and they accepted it, ordering six episodes of the series to be produced, along with an additional four scripts.

The pilot episode was produced at Reed's Floyd County Productions studio in Atlanta, Georgia, over the course of approximately one month. Animation took place at Radical Axis Studio, also located in Atlanta. The artistic style of the series was designed to be as realistic as possible, so the character designers used as much reference material as they could. In order to create consistency between the separate animators, the artists take photographs of each actor and utilize Adobe Illustrator to trace over them as a base for each actor's character. As Chad Hurd, the lead character designer for the series, noted, the result resembles "a 1960’s comic book come to life."

FX originally planned on pairing the premiere of Archer with the fifth season of the network's situation comedy It's Always Sunny in Philadelphia on Thursday nights in the fall. However, the network learned of the long, month-long production length it would take to create the needed six episodes and realized that there was not enough time to have all of the episodes ready before Philadelphia began its new season. FX then decided to reschedule the series and start airing it in January 2010, and replaced Archer with The League as Philadelphia's companion show. Despite this, FX also decided to air a sneak airing of "Mole Hunt" following the season five premiere of Philadelphia on September 17, 2009. The network did not promote the sneak peek, nor did they feature it on any program listings, and merely informed select television critics.

== Reception ==
"However, most importantly, the dialogue is funny. I found myself closing my eyes a few times during the show, in an attempt to ignore the animation, and just listen. It worked."

— Jonathan Toomey, TV Squad

In its official broadcast on FX on January 14, 2010, "Mole Hunt", which aired as the second episode, attracted 1.4 million viewers, with 950,000 of them being within the key 18–49 demographics. This was a slight drop from the airing of the second episode "Training Day", which aired the same day and attracted 1.2 million viewers in between the ages of 18 and 49, and 1.8 million viewers in total. In 2010, H. Jon Benjamin received a Primetime Emmy Award nomination for Outstanding Voice-Over Performance for voicing Archer in the episode; he lost, however, to Anne Hathaway for her performance in The Simpsons.

"Mole Hunt" received generally favorable reviews from television critics and media outlets. David Hinckley of the New York Daily News wrote that it "has a little 'Arrested Development' and a little of 'The Office' and maybe some 'Mad Men,'" and recommended it to readers as one of the "new and good on TV this fall." Hinkely also commented favorably on the scene where Archer tries firing bullets at the door to the mainframe, only to a bullet ricochet and hit another agent, likening it to "Leslie Nielsen classics." Matt Roush of TV Guide said that he "got many more sustained belly laughs" out of the episode than he did with the aforementioned Philadelphia premiere.

Writing for Variety, Brian Lowry opined that with "Mole Hunt," Archer "gives FX something that the drama-heavy channel hasn't enjoyed for awhile — namely, a sharp comedic arrow in its quiver." Jonathan Toomey of TV Squad applauded the character development in the "Mole Hunt," as it "was fairly impressive." Moreover, though, Toomey praised the dialogue, saying "The back and forth between Archer and Figgis and Archer and Lana were laugh out loud funny," and noted that he wished he could incorporate the phrase "baby town frolics" from the episode into a conversation. Toomey did, however, say that he felt that the plotting was "a bit of a stretch," and noted that the realization that Krenshaw was actually a Russian spy named Kremenski was "out of nowhere" and "a bit confusing."

Whitney Matheson wrote for USA Today that "Mole Hunt" was "crude and offbeat" but "also very funny and a welcome addition to [her] DVR queue." Maureen Ryan, writing for the Chicago Tribune, applauded both the voice cast and the "deadpan wit and surreal goofiness." Mark A. Perigard of the Boston Herald, awarded the episode a "B+" calling it a "spy spoof [that] hits a bull’s-eye with risque snark and one of the best vocal casts assembled for any animated series." In an article for the San Francisco Chronicle, Tim Goodman called "Mole Hunt" a "brilliant pilot." Rob Owen in his review for the series in the Pittsburgh Post-Gazette said that though it was crude, the episode is "far more clever than last fall's disappointing 'Testees,'" and that it "wins points with its observational humor about modern life and in its mocking of mundane workplace minutiae." Aaron Barnhart wrote in his article for McClatchy News Service that it was "very funny."

Other reviewers, however, have commented negatively towards "Mole Hunt." Barry Garron of The Hollywood Reporter did not enjoy the episode, saying it "looks great but could be much funnier" and "rife with words that would be bleeped on broadcast channels and even most other basic-cable outlets." Rick Bentley of McClatchy Newspapers wrote, "Most of the comedy is milked from the personal relationships in the office, which start off tedious and only grow more annoying. The adult material – from nudity to words you haven't heard on basic cable – comes across as merely an attempt to be shocking. It's hard to be shocked when you are bored."

On the season one DVD boxset, there is a bonus feature where the episode plays out as normal with the character of Sterling Archer being replaced by a velociraptor making dinosaur noises for Archer's dialogue.
