= Archer season 4 =

Archer
- Season 4
- DVD cover
- Starring: H. Jon Benjamin; Judy Greer; Amber Nash; Chris Parnell; Aisha Tyler; Lucky Yates; Jessica Walter
- No. of episodes: 13

Release
- Original network: FX
- Original release: January 17 – April 11, 2013

Season chronology
- ← Previous; Season 3 Next → Archer Vice

The fourth season of the animated television series, Archer originally aired in the United States on the cable network FX. This season started on January 17, 2013, with "Fugue and Riffs" and ended with the two part episode "Sea Tunt" on April 4 and April 11, 2013, respectively, with a total of thirteen episodes.

== Production ==
On February 23, 2012, the Atlanta Journal-Constitution reported that FX had ordered a 13-episode 4th season of Archer, and signed a multi-year deal with Adam Reed and Matt Thompson's Floyd County Productions. Aisha Tyler also confirmed Archer was returning for a fourth season early in 2013 while appearing as a guest on Rove LA. The first episode premiered on January 17, 2013.

== Episodes ==
No. overall	No. in season	Title	Written by	Original release date	Prod. code	US viewers (millions)
37	1	"Fugue and Riffs"	Adam Reed	January 17, 2013	XAR04001	1.61
Archer has amnesia and believes he is now a burger joint owner named Bob with a wife named Linda and three kids named Gene, Louise, and Tina. When he inexplicably stops a KGB attempt on his life, he flees to a spa, where ISIS tries to bring back his memories as more KGB assassins arrive. Special guest stars: Ron Leibman as Ron Cadillac and John Roberts as Linda Belcher
38	2	"The Wind Cries Mary"	Adam Reed & Chris Provenzano	January 24, 2013	XAR04003	1.58
Archer sets out to clear the name of a former ISIS agent who was his best friend, but there is more to him than Archer believes. Special guest star: Timothy Olyphant as Lucas Troy
39	3	"Legs"	Adam Reed	January 31, 2013	XAR04004	1.58
Krieger offers to give Ray the power to walk again. Archer runs afoul of Rodney, the new armory supervisor. Archer also hears about Ray's procedure and, fearing robots, tries to stop it. Special guest star: Ron Leibman as Ron Cadillac
40	4	"Midnight Ron"	Adam Reed & Tesha Kondrat	February 7, 2013	XAR04005	1.28
Ron Cadillac's past is revealed and step-father and son bonding occurs as Ron rescues Archer from Montreal, where's he's stranded with no money or passport. Archer saves Ron from an ambush by mobsters, and the two escape after they are kidnapped by a transvestite trucker. Special guest star: Ron Leibman as Ron Cadillac
41	5	"Viscous Coupling"	Adam Reed	February 14, 2013	XAR04006	1.15
Katya enlists Archer's help to bring Barry back from space. Archer uses this opportunity to try to get her back. Special guest star: Ona Grauer as Katya Kazanova
42	6	"Once Bitten"	Adam Reed	February 21, 2013	XAR04007	1.70
A snake bites Archer's taint during a covert operation to blow up an oil pipe and, in the vein of Heaven Can Wait, his subsequent venom-induced hallucinations uncover mysteries from his past, including the identity of his long-lost father. Special guest star: Peter Serafinowicz as James Mason
43	7	"Live and Let Dine"	Adam Reed	February 28, 2013	XAR04008	1.52
When there is a threat against the Albanian ambassador, the ISIS agents investigate the threat undercover in Lance Casteau's restaurant. Meanwhile, Malory has Pam and Cheryl try to get a table at the restaurant. Special guest stars: Anthony Bourdain as Lance Casteau, Ona Grauer as Katya Kazanova and Ron Leibman as Ron Cadillac
44	8	"Coyote Lovely"	Adam Reed	March 7, 2013	XAR04002	1.53
Sterling Archer's weakness for beautiful women bungles a Border Patrol mission. Malory leads a witch hunt style investigation of the incident. Special guest stars: Dayton Callie as Veterinarian, Carla Jimenez as Mercedes Moreno and Nick Searcy as Border Patrol
45	9	"The Honeymooners"	Mike Arnold & Adam Reed	March 14, 2013	XAR04009	1.17
Archer and Lana go undercover as a couple on their honeymoon to catch North Korean terrorists attempting to buy uranium. Cyril, Pam and Cheryl follow to spy on them, while Malory takes away Archer's bonus for stealing her credit card.
46	10	"Un Chien Tangerine"	Adam Reed & Mike Arnold	March 21, 2013	XAR04010	1.37
Archer and Lana extract an agent from Morocco only to find out his bark is worse than his bite. Pam wants to be a field agent.
47	11	"The Papal Chase"	Story by : Eric Sims; Teleplay by : Adam Reed	March 28, 2013	XAR04011	1.38
Archer, Lana and Pam are sent to the Vatican to try to prevent an assassination on the Pope by using Woodhouse as a decoy. Special guest star: Ron Leibman as Ron Cadillac
48	12	"Sea Tunt: Part I"	Adam Reed	April 4, 2013	XAR04012	1.30
ISIS is sent on a mission to recover a hydrogen bomb from a crashed B-52 with the help of Cheryl's brother and his girlfriend, who she fears is after her inheritance. Special guest stars: Jon Hamm as Captain Hazel "Hank" Murphy, Eugene Mirman as Cecil Tunt and Kristen Schaal as Tiffy
49	13	"Sea Tunt: Part II"	Adam Reed & Rick Cleveland	April 11, 2013	XAR04013	1.61
Murphy threatens to detonate nerve-gas missiles over the Eastern Seaboard unless his demands are met. Meanwhile, the ISIS agents descend to deal with him in his underwater lair, where it is revealed that Lana is pregnant. Special guest stars: Jon Hamm as Captain Hazel "Hank" Murphy, Eugene Mirman as Cecil Tunt and Kristen Schaal as Tiffy

== Home media ==
Archer: The Complete Fourth Season
Set details	Special features	
13 episodes; 2-disc set; 16:9 aspect ratio; Languages: English; Subtitles; English; Spanish; French	Fisherman's Daughter; Archer Live!	
DVD release dates
Region 1	Region 2	Region 4
January 7, 2014	TBA	TBA
