= List of Archer episodes =

Archer is an American animated comedy series created by Adam Reed for the FX network. The first four seasons are set at the International Secret Intelligence Service (ISIS) and surround suave master spy Sterling Archer as he deals with global espionage; a domineering, late middle-aged mother/boss, Malory Archer; his ex-girlfriend, Agent Lana Kane; and accountant Cyril Figgis.

The fifth season, titled Archer Vice, follows Archer and his entourage as they resort to drug dealing, having been caught by the FBI operating an illegal espionage operation in the seasons' opening. The sixth season chronicles the group working as contract hires for the CIA until they commit the ultimate screw-up. Out of work, the ISIS ensemble moves to Los Angeles and pursues private investigation work at the Figgis Agency in the seventh season. This concludes with Archer being shot, which sets the plot for the following seasons (8–10) in which he is in a coma. In seasons 11–14, the show returns to its original spy-agency format.

The fourteenth and final season premiered on August 30, 2023 and ended with a three-part series finale titled Archer: Into the Cold, which aired on December 17, 2023. During the course of the series, 145 episodes of Archer aired over fourteen seasons, between September 17, 2009 and December 17, 2023.

== Series overview ==
Season	Episodes		Originally released		
Season	Episodes		First released	Last released	Network
1	10		September 17, 2009	March 18, 2010	FX
2	13		January 27, 2011	April 21, 2011	FX
3	13		September 15, 2011	March 22, 2012	FX
4	13		January 17, 2013	April 11, 2013	FX
5	13		January 13, 2014	April 21, 2014	FX
6	13		January 8, 2015	April 2, 2015	FX
7	10		March 31, 2016	June 2, 2016	FX
8	8		April 5, 2017	May 24, 2017	FXX
9	8		April 25, 2018	June 13, 2018	FXX
10	9		May 29, 2019	July 31, 2019	FXX
11	8		September 16, 2020	October 28, 2020	FXX
12	8		August 25, 2021	October 6, 2021	FXX
13	8		August 24, 2022	October 12, 2022	FXX
14	11	8	August 30, 2023	October 11, 2023	FXX
14	11	3	December 17, 2023		FXX

== Episodes ==
=== Season 1 (2009–10) ===
No. overall	No. in season	Title	Written by	Original release date	Prod. code	US viewers (millions)
1	1	"Mole Hunt"	Adam Reed	September 17, 2009	XAR01001	0.91
2	2	"Training Day"	Adam Reed	January 14, 2010	XAR01002	1.82
3	3	"Diversity Hire"	Adam Reed	January 21, 2010	XAR01004	1.23
4	4	"Killing Utne"	Adam Reed	January 28, 2010	XAR01003	0.87
5	5	"Honeypot"	Adam Reed & Tony Carbone	February 4, 2010	XAR01005	0.62
6	6	"Skorpio"	Adam Reed	February 11, 2010	XAR01006	0.76
7	7	"Skytanic"	Adam Reed	February 18, 2010	XAR01007	0.87
8	8	"The Rock"	Adam Reed & Boswell Cocker	March 4, 2010	XAR01008	0.72
9	9	"Job Offer"	Adam Reed	March 11, 2010	XAR01009	1.08
10	10	"Dial M for Mother"	Adam Reed	March 18, 2010	XAR01010	0.76

=== Season 2 (2011) ===
No. overall	No. in season	Title	Written by	Original release date	Prod. code	US viewers (millions)
11	1	"Swiss Miss"	Story by : Mehar Sethi; Teleplay by : Adam Reed	January 27, 2011	XAR02002	1.53
12	2	"A Going Concern"	Adam Reed	February 3, 2011	XAR02006	1.11
13	3	"Blood Test"	Adam Reed	February 10, 2011	XAR02001	1.12
14	4	"Pipeline Fever"	Story by : Boswell Cocker; Teleplay by : Adam Reed	February 17, 2011	XAR02007	0.99
15	5	"The Double Deuce"	Adam Reed	February 24, 2011	XAR02004	1.00
16	6	"Tragical History"	Adam Reed	March 3, 2011	XAR02005	1.02
17	7	"Movie Star"	Adam Reed	March 10, 2011	XAR02003	1.02
18	8	"Stage Two"	Adam Reed	March 17, 2011	XAR02008	0.93
19	9	"Placebo Effect"	Adam Reed	March 24, 2011	XAR02009	1.09
20	10	"El Secuestro"	Adam Reed	March 31, 2011	XAR02010	1.32
21	11	"Jeu Monégasque"	Adam Reed	April 7, 2011	XAR02011	1.01
22	12	"White Nights"	Adam Reed	April 14, 2011	XAR02012	1.21
23	13	"Double Trouble"	Adam Reed	April 21, 2011	XAR02013	1.01

=== Season 3 (2011–12) ===
No. overall	No. in season	Title	Written by	Original release date	Prod. code	US viewers (millions)
24	1	"Heart of Archness: Part I"	Adam Reed	September 15, 2011	XAR03001	1.17
25	2	"Heart of Archness: Part II"	Adam Reed	September 22, 2011	XAR03002	1.10
26	3	"Heart of Archness: Part III"	Adam Reed	September 29, 2011	XAR03003	1.19
27	4	"The Man from Jupiter"	Adam Reed	January 19, 2012	XAR03005	1.31
28	5	"El Contador"	Story by : Tesha Kondrat; Teleplay by : Adam Reed	January 26, 2012	XAR03006	1.12
29	6	"The Limited"	Adam Reed	February 2, 2012	XAR03007	1.06
30	7	"Drift Problem"	Adam Reed	February 9, 2012	XAR03008	1.22
31	8	"Lo Scandalo"	Adam Reed	February 16, 2012	XAR03004	1.20
32	9	"Bloody Ferlin"	Adam Reed	February 23, 2012	XAR03010	1.27
33	10	"Crossing Over"	Adam Reed	March 1, 2012	XAR03009	1.07
34	11	"Skin Game"	Chris Provenzano & Adam Reed	March 8, 2012	XAR03011	1.04
35	12	"Space Race: Part I"	Adam Reed	March 15, 2012	XAR03012	1.16
36	13	"Space Race: Part II"	Adam Reed	March 22, 2012	XAR03013	1.33

=== Season 4 (2013) ===
No. overall	No. in season	Title	Written by	Original release date	Prod. code	US viewers (millions)
37	1	"Fugue and Riffs"	Adam Reed	January 17, 2013	XAR04001	1.61
38	2	"The Wind Cries Mary"	Adam Reed & Chris Provenzano	January 24, 2013	XAR04003	1.58
39	3	"Legs"	Adam Reed	January 31, 2013	XAR04004	1.58
40	4	"Midnight Ron"	Adam Reed & Tesha Kondrat	February 7, 2013	XAR04005	1.28
41	5	"Viscous Coupling"	Adam Reed	February 14, 2013	XAR04006	1.15
42	6	"Once Bitten"	Adam Reed	February 21, 2013	XAR04007	1.70
43	7	"Live and Let Dine"	Adam Reed	February 28, 2013	XAR04008	1.52
44	8	"Coyote Lovely"	Adam Reed	March 7, 2013	XAR04002	1.53
45	9	"The Honeymooners"	Mike Arnold & Adam Reed	March 14, 2013	XAR04009	1.17
46	10	"Un Chien Tangerine"	Adam Reed & Mike Arnold	March 21, 2013	XAR04010	1.37
47	11	"The Papal Chase"	Story by : Eric Sims; Teleplay by : Adam Reed	March 28, 2013	XAR04011	1.38
48	12	"Sea Tunt: Part I"	Adam Reed	April 4, 2013	XAR04012	1.30
49	13	"Sea Tunt: Part II"	Adam Reed & Rick Cleveland	April 11, 2013	XAR04013	1.61

=== Season 5: Archer Vice (2014) ===
No. overall	No. in season	Title	Written by	Original release date	Prod. code	US viewers (millions)
50	1	"White Elephant"	Adam Reed	January 13, 2014	XAR05001	1.65
51	2	"A Kiss While Dying"	Adam Reed	January 20, 2014	XAR05002	1.17
52	3	"A Debt of Honor"	Adam Reed	January 27, 2014	XAR05003	1.13
53	4	"House Call"	Adam Reed	February 3, 2014	XAR05004	1.13
54	5	"Southbound and Down"	Adam Reed & Ben Hoffman	February 24, 2014	XAR05005	1.05
55	6	"Baby Shower"	Adam Reed	March 3, 2014	XAR05009	0.95
56	7	"Smugglers' Blues"	Adam Reed	March 10, 2014	XAR05006	0.87
57	8	"The Rules of Extraction"	Adam Reed	March 17, 2014	XAR05007	1.08
58	9	"On the Carpet"	Adam Reed	March 24, 2014	XAR05008	0.91
59	10	"Palace Intrigue: Part I"	Adam Reed	March 31, 2014	XAR05010	0.92
60	11	"Palace Intrigue: Part II"	Adam Reed	April 7, 2014	XAR05011	0.87
61	12	"Filibuster"	Adam Reed	April 14, 2014	XAR05012	1.07
62	13	"Arrivals/Departures"	Adam Reed	April 21, 2014	XAR05013	0.68

=== Season 6 (2015) ===
No. overall	No. in season	Title	Written by	Original release date	Prod. code	US viewers (millions)
63	1	"The Holdout"	Adam Reed	January 8, 2015	XAR06001	1.51
64	2	"Three to Tango"	Adam Reed	January 15, 2015	XAR06002	0.90
65	3	"The Archer Sanction"	Adam Reed	January 22, 2015	XAR06003	0.88
66	4	"Edie's Wedding"	Adam Reed	January 29, 2015	XAR06004	1.23
67	5	"Vision Quest"	Adam Reed & Ben Hoffman	February 5, 2015	XAR06005	0.98
68	6	"Sitting"	Adam Reed	February 12, 2015	XAR06006	0.81
69	7	"Nellis"	Adam Reed	February 19, 2015	XAR06007	1.08
70	8	"The Kanes"	Adam Reed	February 26, 2015	XAR06008	1.08
71	9	"Pocket Listing"	Adam Reed	March 5, 2015	XAR06009	0.92
72	10	"Reignition Sequence"	Adam Reed	March 12, 2015	XAR06010	1.07
73	11	"Achub Y Morfilod"	Adam Reed & Mike Arnold; Story inspiration from a rousing tale by : Matthew Rhys	March 19, 2015	XAR06011	0.84
74	12	"Drastic Voyage: Part I"	Adam Reed & Casey Willis	March 26, 2015	XAR06012	0.79
75	13	"Drastic Voyage: Part II"	Adam Reed & Casey Willis	April 2, 2015	XAR06013	0.72

=== Season 7 (2016) ===
No. overall	No. in season	Title	Written by	Original release date	Prod. code	US viewers (millions)
76	1	"The Figgis Agency"	Adam Reed	March 31, 2016	XAR07001	1.07
77	2	"The Handoff"	Adam Reed	April 7, 2016	XAR07002	0.75
78	3	"Deadly Prep"	Adam Reed	April 14, 2016	XAR07003	0.79
79	4	"Motherless Child"	Adam Reed	April 21, 2016	XAR07004	0.79
80	5	"Bel Panto: Part I"	Adam Reed	April 28, 2016	XAR07005	0.68
81	6	"Bel Panto: Part II"	Adam Reed	May 5, 2016	XAR07006	0.83
82	7	"Double Indecency"	Adam Reed	May 12, 2016	XAR07007	0.76
83	8	"Liquid Lunch"	Adam Reed	May 19, 2016	XAR07008	0.70
84	9	"Deadly Velvet: Part I"	Adam Reed	May 26, 2016	XAR07009	0.76
85	10	"Deadly Velvet: Part II"	Adam Reed	June 2, 2016	XAR07010	0.71

=== Season 8: Archer Dreamland (2017) ===
No. overall	No. in season	Title	Written by	Original release date	Prod. code	US viewers (millions)
86	1	"No Good Deed"	Adam Reed	April 5, 2017	XAR08001	0.74
87	2	"Berenice"	Adam Reed	April 12, 2017	XAR08002	0.50
88	3	"Jane Doe"	Adam Reed	April 19, 2017	XAR08003	0.47
89	4	"Ladyfingers"	Adam Reed	April 26, 2017	XAR08004	0.48
90	5	"Sleepers Wake"	Adam Reed	May 3, 2017	XAR08005	0.44
91	6	"Waxing Gibbous"	Adam Reed	May 10, 2017	XAR08006	0.38
92	7	"Gramercy, Halberd!"	Adam Reed	May 17, 2017	XAR08007	0.31
93	8	"Auflösung"	Adam Reed	May 24, 2017	XAR08008	0.42

=== Season 9: Danger Island (2018) ===
No. overall	No. in season	Title	Written by	Original release date	Prod. code	US viewers (millions)
94	1	"Strange Pilot"	Adam Reed	April 25, 2018	XAR09001	0.51
95	2	"Disheartening Situation"	Adam Reed	May 2, 2018	XAR09002	0.44
96	3	"Different Modes of Preparing the Fruit"	Adam Reed	May 9, 2018	XAR09003	0.36
97	4	"A Warrior in Costume"	Adam Reed	May 16, 2018	XAR09004	0.41
98	5	"Strange Doings in the Taboo Groves"	Adam Reed & Mike Arnold	May 23, 2018	XAR09005	0.33
99	6	"Some Remarks on Cannibalism"	Adam Reed	May 30, 2018	XAR09006	0.37
100	7	"Comparative Wickedness of Civilized and Unenlightened Peoples"	Adam Reed	June 6, 2018	XAR09007	0.29
101	8	"A Discovery"	Adam Reed	June 13, 2018	XAR09008	0.35

=== Season 10: Archer 1999 (2019) ===
No. overall	No. in season	Title	Written by	Original release date	Prod. code	US viewers (millions)
102	1	"Bort the Garj"	Adam Reed	May 29, 2019	XAR010001	0.45
103	2	"Happy Borthday"	Adam Reed	June 5, 2019	XAR010002	0.29
104	3	"The Leftovers"	Mark Ganek	June 12, 2019	XAR010003	0.34
105	4	"Dining with the Zarglorp"	Shane Kosakowski	June 19, 2019	XAR010004	0.24
106	5	"Mr. Deadly Goes to Town"	Mark Ganek	June 26, 2019	XAR010005	0.29
107	6	"Road Trip"	Mike Arnold	July 10, 2019	XAR010006	0.25
108	7	"Space Pirates"	Kelly Galuska	July 17, 2019	XAR010007	0.26
109	8	"Cubert"	Adam Reed & Tesha Kondrat	July 24, 2019	XAR010008	0.23
110	9	"Robert De Niro"	Adam Reed	July 31, 2019	XAR010009	0.25

=== Season 11 (2020) ===
No. overall	No. in season	Title	Directed by	Written by	Original release date	Prod. code	US viewers (millions)
111	1	"The Orpheus Gambit"	Chad Hurd	Mark Ganek	September 16, 2020	XAR011001	0.38
112	2	"Bloodsploosh"	Pierre Cerrato	Mike Arnold	September 16, 2020	XAR011002	0.31
113	3	"Helping Hands"	Casey Willis	Shana Gohd	September 23, 2020	XAR011003	0.24
114	4	"Robot Factory"	Matt Thompson	Matt Roller	September 30, 2020	XAR011004	0.29
115	5	"Best Friends"	Chi Duong Sato	Matt Roller	October 7, 2020	XAR011005	0.31
116	6	"The Double Date"	Marcus Rosentrater	Shane Kosakowski	October 14, 2020	XAR011006	0.36
117	7	"Caught Napping"	Justin Wagner	Mark Ganek	October 21, 2020	XAR011007	0.33
118	8	"Cold Fusion"	Casey Willis	Mark Ganek	October 28, 2020	XAR011008	0.31

=== Season 12 (2021) ===
No. overall	No. in season	Title	Directed by	Written by	Original release date	Prod. code	US viewers (millions)
119	1	"Identity Crisis"	Matt Thompson	Shane Kosakowski	August 25, 2021	XAR012001	0.25
120	2	"Lowjacked"	Pierre Cerrato	Shana Gohd	August 25, 2021	XAR012002	0.23
121	3	"London Time"	Justin Wagner	Brittany Miller	September 1, 2021	XAR012003	0.28
122	4	"Photo Op"	Casey Willis	Asha Michelle Wilson	September 8, 2021	XAR012004	0.19
123	5	"Shots"	Matt Thompson	Matt Roller	September 15, 2021	XAR012005	0.23
124	6	"Dingo, Baby, Et Cetera"	Chi Duong	Mark Ganek	September 22, 2021	XAR012006	0.23
125	7	"Colt Express"	Yusuke Sato	Alison Silverman	September 29, 2021	XAR012007	0.21
126	8	"Mission: Difficult"	Megan Johnson	Mark Ganek	October 6, 2021	XAR012008	0.19

=== Season 13 (2022) ===
No. overall	No. in season	Title	Directed by	Written by	Original release date	Prod. code	US viewers (millions)
127	1	"The Big Con"	Justin Wagner	Mark Ganek	August 24, 2022	XAR013001	0.29
128	2	"Operation: Fang"	Matt Thompson	Matt Roller	August 31, 2022	XAR013002	0.27
129	3	"Saturday"	Pierre Cerrato	Asha Michelle Wilson	September 7, 2022	XAR013003	0.31
130	4	"Laws of Attraction"	Omaka Schultz	Brittany Miller	September 14, 2022	XAR013004	0.35
131	5	"Out of Network"	Megan Johnson	Matt Roller	September 21, 2022	XAR013005	0.27
132	6	"Bank Run at Mr. Bank's Bank"	Kim Feigenbaum	Alison Silverman	September 28, 2022	XAR013006	0.22
133	7	"Distraction Action"	Casey Willis	Miles Woods	October 5, 2022	XAR013007	0.22
134	8	"Dough, Ray, and Me"	Stephen Slesinski	Mark Ganek	October 12, 2022	XAR013008	0.22

=== Season 14 (2023) ===
No. overall	No. in season	Title	Directed by	Written by	Original release date	Prod. code	US viewers (millions)
Season
135	1	"The Anglerfish Stratagem"	Pierre Cerrato	Mark Ganek	August 30, 2023	XAR014001	0.28
Lana Kane as the new head of the agency assigns Archer, Ray and Pam to work with Interpol agent, Zara Khan, to take down the Vanguard, a crew of thieves.
136	2	"30 for 30"	Kim Feigenbaum	Matt Roller	August 30, 2023	XAR014002	0.25
Archer, Pam, Ray, and Zara are captured by the thieves know as the Vanguard. Zara and Archer argue about who is the best agent and who is best at making plans. They compete over how many enemies they can take out. In the end, Zara joins the team.
137	3	"Plaque Removal"	Matt Thompson	Asha Michelle Wilson	September 6, 2023	XAR014003	0.22
The team are hired to protect an artifact being moved between a British museum and storage. A smuggler steals the artifact with the intent to return it to its country of origin. Lana has a moral crisis over this, as the client can help AJ get into a good school, but eventually they team up with the smuggler to return the artifact.
138	4	"Chill Barry"	Omaka Schultz	Mark Ganek	September 13, 2023	XAR014004	0.15
Barry returns, this time with his mind inside a mini-fridge. Evil Barry has also returned and Good Barry and the agency team up to stop him. They defeat Evil Barry by dropping him into a vat of acid.
139	5	"Keys Open Doors"	Justin Wagner	Miles Woods	September 20, 2023	XAR014005	0.17
Zara takes off the next mission for a "self-care" day forcing Lana back into the field. The mission is to destroy a cocaine processing plant; however, the crew lose the detonator and instead take up jobs in the local town against Lana's wishes.
140	6	"Face Off"	Megan Johnson	Matt Roller	September 27, 2023	XAR014006	0.15
Lana decides to stop paying the many bribes Malory used to, which leads to major fallout in the city. The rest of the team infiltrates a plastic surgery hospital where Archer becomes melancholic after x-rays show his body is badly damaged from his life as a spy. However, he ultimately decides he is the luckiest person alive and can still act as he always has.
141	7	"Mission Out of Control Room"	Casey Willis	Asha Michelle Wilson	October 4, 2023	XAR014007	0.13
Lana gets a fancy new communication system to control missions from afar. The episode takes the form of body camera footage of a mission as the team is split into pairs of two around the globe to take down an internet black market site with three servers. Lana organizes from the control room, but the new system does not lead to greater efficiency. In the end, the normal chaos leads to the team shutting down the site.
142	8	"Breaking Fabian"	Stephen Slesinski	Matt Roller	October 11, 2023	XAR014008	0.19
Drones start killing former IIA agents and the team goes to see the incarcerated Fabian to deactivate them while Lana and Cyril are summoned to the UN. After the team get Fabian out of prison, former IIA agents and the drones try to kill them. The team evades the agents and successfully deactivate the drones, in the process Archer cuts off Fabian's hand. The UN rules to disband private spy agencies.
Series finale
143	9	Archer: Into the Cold	Pierre Cerrato & Casey Willis	Mark Ganek	December 17, 2023	XARR14009	0.27
144	10	Archer: Into the Cold	Pierre Cerrato & Casey Willis	Mark Ganek	December 17, 2023	XARR14010	0.27
145	11	Archer: Into the Cold	Pierre Cerrato & Casey Willis	Mark Ganek	December 17, 2023	XARR14011	0.27
Part 1: As the UN prepares to vote to ban private spy agencies, the team is in Brazil to retrieve a stolen bunker-buster bomb. The team successfully steals back the bomb; however, when they hand it over to the C.I.A. it turns out to be Slater, who is now a rogue agent. Sterling nearly stops him, but Katya appears and shoots him. Part 2: At a black-site, Sterling is tortured by Boris, and Katya reveals that the plan is to restart the Cold War. Sterling escapes and tells the team he is in Sochi. The team arrives and investigates possible targets at a casino. They discover that the plan is to blow up a dam to flood the town and kill a group of Russian and Chinese officials, blaming the Americans. Katya, in a letter, offers Archer the chance to join her and be forever relevant by returning to the golden age of old school spy craft. However, Archer decides to be loyal to his team. Part 3: The team tries to stop Slater and Katya from blowing up the dam. They reconnect Barry to a robot-body to fight Katya, but his body is a miniature and Katya beats the crew. She is then betrayed by Slater. The team comes together to escape and evacuate the town, with Slater losing a fight to Archer and falling off the dam as the bomb goes off. Despite saving the world, the UN votes to ban private spies. Three months later, Archer is a rogue freelance spy and Lana gets an offer to track him down. She tells Archer this and they have a nice conversation about their past and Archer sets back off into the world with Pam by his side.
