= Daisho Con =

Anime convention in the United States

Coordinates: 43°34′14″N 89°46′13″W

- Daisho Con Logo
- Status: Defunct
- Genre: Multi-genre
- Venue: Kalahari Resorts: Wisconsin Dells
- Location: Wisconsin Dells, Wisconsin
- Country: United States
- Inaugurated: 2008
- Organizer: Daisho Con
- Website: http://www.daishocon.org

Daisho Con was an annual three-day multi-genre convention held during November at the Kalahari Resorts: Wisconsin Dells in Wisconsin Dells, Wisconsin. The convention's name came from a small sword used by the samurai, named 'daisho'.

== Programming ==
The convention typically offered an artists' alley, board games, card games, a cosplay contest, dealers' room, live music, rave, and video game room. The video game room ran 24-hours a day during the convention.

== History ==
Daisho Con was founded by three students of the University of Wisconsin–Stevens Point and organized by a group of the same name. In February 2010, the convention held a live fundraiser broadcast over Ustream to raise money to aid relief efforts following the 2010 Haiti earthquake. The Ramada Inn, Daisho Con's 2010 location, would suddenly close in October 2011. In 2015, the convention was scheduled against Awesome Con Milwaukee, until they cancelled. Daisho Con 2020 was cancelled due to the COVID-19 pandemic. Daisho Con announced the convention would not return in November 2021.

=== Event history ===
Dates	Location	Attendance	Guests
November 21–23, 2008	Ramada Stevens Point Hotel; Stevens Point, Wisconsin	575	Jason "Liquid86" Bruner, Tiffany Grant, John Jackson Miller, Patrick Rothfuss, and Steam Century (HMA Badger).
November 20–22, 2009	Ramada Stevens Point Hotel; Stevens Point, Wisconsin	1,076	Arashi Taiko Dan, Laura Bailey, Jason "Liquid86" Bruner, Dr. Cancer and the SKAmbies, Steve Horton, Patrick Rothfuss, Tim Seeley, Steam Century (HMA Badger), and Travis Willingham.
November 19–21, 2010	Ramada Stevens Point Hotel; Stevens Point, Wisconsin	1,450	Arashi Taiko Dan, Troy Baker, Jason "Liquid86" Bruner, Dr. Cancer and the SKAmbies, Lewis Lovhaug, Scott Lynch, Patrick Rothfuss, Spike Spencer, and Doug Walker.
November 18–20, 2011	Kalahari Resorts: Wisconsin Dells; Wisconsin Dells, Wisconsin	1,432	Jason "Liquid86" Bruner, Dr. Cancer and the SKAmbies, Dusty Jack, Matt Hill, JadePrince, Scott Lynch, Reni Mimura, Patrick Rothfuss, Scootywok Sound And Light, and Stephanie Young.
November 16–18, 2012	Kalahari Resorts: Wisconsin Dells; Wisconsin Dells, Wisconsin	1,769	Jason "DarkMero" Bergren, Jason "Liquid86" Bruner, Dusty Jack, JadePrince, Scott Lynch, Chris Patton, Scootywok Sound And Light, Sonny Strait, John Swasey, and J.L. Westover.
November 22–24, 2013	Kalahari Resorts: Wisconsin Dells; Wisconsin Dells, Wisconsin		Nathan Barnatt, Cherami Leigh, Scott Lynch, Trudi Miller, Amber Nash, Steam Century (HMA Badger), J. Michael Tatum, Doc Volz, J.L. Westover, and Lucky Yates.
November 21–23, 2014	Kalahari Resorts: Wisconsin Dells; Wisconsin Dells, Wisconsin	3,149	Kevin Bolk, Ashly Burch, Josh Grelle, DJ HeavyGrinder, Scott Lynch, Revolution Boi, Monica Rial, Ring of Steel, Chris Sabat, Time Crash, and Niq van der Aa.
November 20–22, 2015	Kalahari Resorts: Wisconsin Dells; Wisconsin Dells, Wisconsin	4,401	Liui Aquino, Colleen Clinkenbeard, DJ Pete Ellison, Jessica Gee-George, Grant George, Jamie Marchi, The Slants, V is for Villains, Niq van der Aa, and Janet Varney.
November 18–20, 2016	Kalahari Resorts: Wisconsin Dells; Wisconsin Dells, Wisconsin		Nathan DeLuca, DJ Pete Ellison, James Marsters, Brina Palencia, The Pillowcases, Ian Sinclair, SuperKayce, and Arryn Zech.
November 17–19, 2017	Kalahari Resorts: Wisconsin Dells; Wisconsin Dells, Wisconsin		Zach Callison, Kara Eberle, DJ Pete Ellison, E. Jason Liebrecht, Elizabeth Maxwell, Tony Oliver, and Powerglove.
November 16–18, 2018	Kalahari Resorts Dells; Wisconsin Dells, Wisconsin		SungWon Cho, DJ HeavyGrinder, Erica Luttrell, Moderately Okay Cosplay, Jamie Mortellaro, Jeremy Shada, Alexis Tipton, and Eric Vale.
November 22–24, 2019	Kalahari Resorts Dells; Wisconsin Dells, Wisconsin		AmaLee, Sean Chiplock, Cowbutt Crunchies Cosplay, Mr. Creepy Pasta, Aaron Dismuke, Ricco Fajardo, Martha Harms, Brianna Knickerbocker, Brittany Lauda, Kayli Mills, Phil Mizuno, Lindsay Seidel, Matt Shipman, Megan Shipman, Patricia Summersett, Dave Trosko, and Christopher Wehkamp.
