= Space Race (Archer) =

- Archer episodes
- Episode nos.: Season 3 Episodes 12/13
- Directed by: Adam Reed
- Written by: Adam Reed
- Production codes: XAR03012; XAR03013
- Original air dates: March 15, 2012 (Part 1); March 22, 2012 (Part 2)

Guest appearance
- Bryan Cranston as Anthony Drake

Episode chronology
← Previous "Skin Game"	Next → "Fugue and Riffs"
- Archer (season 3)

"Space Race" is the two-part season finale of the third season of the animated comedy series Archer. It consists of the twelfth and thirteenth episodes of the season, which were initially broadcast in the United States on FX on March 15 and March 22, 2012, respectively. In the installment, Commander Anthony Drake (Bryan Cranston) urges the field agents of ISIS to travel onto the spacecraft Horizon to aid in ceasing any attacks. After entering and defeating the resistant "mutineers", the field agents are eventually kidnapped by Drake and his aggregation, whose real objective is to colonize and populate the humans on Mars.

"Space Race", which was written and directed by series creator Adam Reed, is a parody of the 1979 spy film Moonraker, the eleventh film of the James Bond cinema franchise. Additionally, the episode is instilled with multiple references to science fiction cinema, including the popular films Aliens, The Right Stuff, and Star Wars Episode IV, as well as political events such as the Cold War's space exploration competition between the Soviet Union and the United States. Cranston guest starred in the program, alongside actor Dave Willis, who reprised his role as recurring antagonist Barry Dylan.

"Space Race: Part I" received overwhelmingly positive reviews from critics, who praised the episode's humor and character developments. Although it acquired positive critiques from commentators, the humor and general execution of "Space Race: Part II" was deemed inferior to its predecessor. "Space Race: Part I" garnered 1.157 million viewers during its initial airing, while "Space Race: Part II" attained 1.33 million viewers upon airing, consequently becoming the most viewed episode of Archer's third season.

== Plot ==
=== Part I ===
The international space station Horizon sends a distress signal to the ISIS agency, stating that the spaceship has been under attack. Anthony Drake (Bryan Cranston), the commander of the station, has urged ISIS to assist the crew in controlling the situation. A reluctant Lana Kane (Aisha Tyler) is the first one to voice concern over the issue, as none of them have undergone training in preparation for a flight. Despite these concerns, Malory Archer (Jessica Walter) is quick to take the job for financial gain. The field agents of ISIS—except Sterling Archer (H. Jon Benjamin), who is being evaluated by Doctor Algernop Krieger (Lucky Yates) for medical purposes—are subjected to basic astronaut regimens in anticipation for the flight, including a flight simulator (which Archer makes Cyril crash), and weightlessness training, which causes Lana to vomit copiously because of the lack of gravity.

ISIS is forced to quit mission training due to time constraints. After the Space Shuttle Intrepid exits out of the Earth's atmosphere, Drake introduces them to the blueprints of Horizon, which is overrun with so-called "mutineers". Drake's plan is to fight past the mutineers and link up with his men on the bridge. The group is aided with an M41A pulse rifle, which is set into two modes: on kill mode, the weapon fires lethal plasma ammunition, while the weapon serves as a tranquilizer on stun mode. Indeed, stun mode can potentially initiate cardiac arrest, as proven when Archer accidentally shoots Cyril Figgis (Chris Parnell), who is later revived after defibrillation. The trajectory of the shuttle is off course from Horizon, which is later found to be caused by Cheryl Tunt (Judy Greer) and Pam Poovey (Amber Nash), who are being harbored in cargo. Archer is then put on probation in the hold, after shooting Pam with his pulse rifle. As the Intrepid lands on a port on the Horizon, Lana, Cyril, and Ray Gillette (Adam Reed) enter into the spacecraft with Drake. Being overwhelmed by the number of mutineers, Archer later joins their endeavors after being released by Pam. The party successfully makes it to the bridge, where it is revealed that Drake and his men are the real mutineers, and his real plan was to lure Lana onto the station to become breeding stock for the colonization of Mars.

=== Part II ===
Archer, Lana, Ray, and Cyril are subsequently kidnapped by Commander Drake and his aggregation, after finding out that his main intent was to terraform Mars. Meanwhile, Drake sends some of his crew to search for Pam, Cheryl, and Malory—who are waiting in the Intrepid. In the holding, Lana takes off her suit in order to distract the guard with her breasts. While successfully distracting the guard, he later activates the security breach. After escaping from their holding, the group encounter a group of scientists, who inform them that Drake's men are making their way into the Intrepid to launch towards Mars. As Cheryl allures Drake with her self-proclaimed "Martian queen" persona, Pam takes him hostage, holding a pulse rifle to his head.

After the ISIS agents reunite and Drake's mutinous crew agrees to surrender in order to prevent his death, Drake has a mental breakdown, declaring humanity to be doomed and killing himself with Pam's rifle. Cyril, startled by the sudden gunfire, opens fire himself, killing three people (one of whom was the only capable pilot of the shuttle other than Drake). To worsen the situation, Barry Dylan (Dave Willis) challenges Archer to fight him in space. Despite the rigorous taunting and demeaning from Barry, Archer ultimately declines his offer. After Archer makes an act of humility, Cyril aims the launches at Barry's jet, subsequently stranding him on Horizon. As the group nears the airstrip, Archer, who wishes to take credit for the landing, messes with the steering shift, causing the spacecraft to crash. Afterwards, every ISIS agent except for Archer is shown to be injured as a result, especially Ray, who is now paralyzed from the waist down (which he ironically had pretended to be earlier in the season).

== Production ==
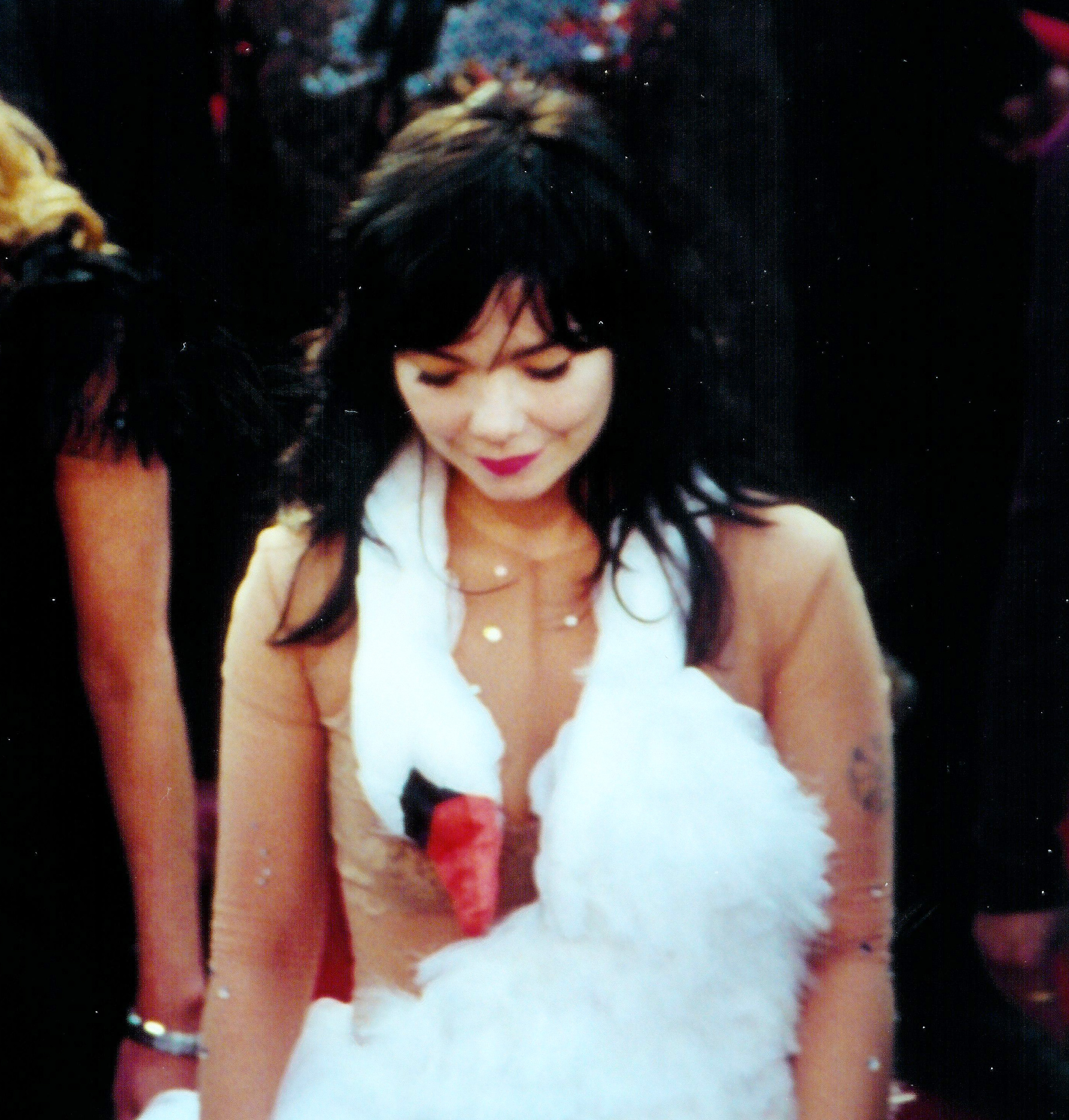
Cheryl's attire is very similar to the swan dress worn by Icelandic recording artist Björk (pictured).

"Space Race" was written and directed by Archer creator Adam Reed. American actor Bryan Cranston guest starred in "Space Race" as Commander Drake, an industrious and fastidious astronaut whose main objective is to fight in order to "quell a mutiny on the space platform". Cranston's appearance was formally announced by series creator Adam Reed in January 2012, while being interviewed by The Huffington Post. While Reed didn't reveal much on the background of the installment, he teased: "I love it when everybody gets to go [on a mission], so a lot more people than you would think get to go to outer space."

"Space Race" is imbued with various references relating to music, cinema, media, and other popular culture entities. The episode title gives homage to the synonymously named era of space exploration between the Soviet Union and the United States, which coincided during the Cold War. The episode plot gives homage to the James Bond film Moonraker (1979). In preparation for the mission, the field agents at ISIS undergo an extensive training regimen similar to the exercise in The Right Stuff (1983). In addition, the episode's narrative is evocative to that of the aforementioned film, as well as the British horror film 28 Days Later (2002). To Jesse Carp of Cinema Blend, the characters "drops weird name references" to figures such as American eugenist Charles Davenport and Grace O'Malley. After main character Sterling Archer is sent into the space brig, he crafts an ode to The Great Escape (1963).

As the second part of "Space Race" commenced, Carp asserted that Drake's opening dialogue was nostalgic of a villainous character from the James Bond film series, particularly Hugo Drax. "'SR:P2' tried to clear up this flimsy plot point from 'P1' during the opening 'Bond villain' like speech from Drake," the Cinema Blend writer iterated, "where he proclaims in a Thank You For Smoking–esque throwaway line that Lana was the perfect and only candidate for the project." In one of Barry's first appearances on the space station, he is taunting "Archer, come out to play", while banging beer bottles together, directly referencing David Patrick Kelly's Luthor in The Warriors. The design of the spaceship emulates the iconic designs of aircraft from varying films; the trash compactors were modeled after the Star Wars universe, while the robots were reminiscent to those in the 1986 film Aliens. As Cheryl declares herself as the "Martian queen", she creates and sports a costumes that closely resembles Björk's swan dress.

== Reception ==
=== Ratings ===
"Space Race: Part I" was originally broadcast on March 16, 2012 in the United States on FX. Upon airing, the episode attained 1.157 million viewers and a 0.7 rating in the 18–49 demographic, indicating that 0.7% of spectators between ages 18 and 49 who watched television viewed the episode. It garnered the twentieth highest ratings among the 18–49 group out of any cable program of the day, according to the Nielsen Media Research, tying with television programs such as The Daily Show on Comedy Central and Family Guy on Adult Swim. Ratings and total viewership for the episode showed significant increases from the previous installment, "Skin Game", which acquired 1.04 million viewers and a 0.5 rating in the 18–49 demographic. "Space Race: Part II" aired the following week on March 23, 2012. Ratings and total viewership considerable increased from its predecessor; 1.326 million spectators watched the episode during its initial airing. Concurrently, it obtained a 0.8 rating in the 18–49 demographic, thereby becoming the eighth highest-rated cable program of the night.

=== Critical response ===
The running gag about how Archer keeps trying to get Cranston's character to say "Danger zone" is a lot of fun already, and it works well with the affable befuddlement Cranston plays for most of the episode.

— Emily VanDerWerff

Commentators commended the first half of "Space Race". The A.V. Club columnist Emily VanDerWerff approved of several aspects of the episode—mainly its animation, character development, and dialogue. In her A grade review, VanDerWerff felt that the producers were playful with the concepts of space. "Archer, of course, takes place in a weird blend of past and present," he professed, "but 'Space Race' goes out of its way to toss 'future' into the middle of that mix as well. There are so many jokes that come just from the characters hanging out in anti-gravity, for God's sake, including a ping pong paddle strategically covering Pam's breasts." Commenting on the program's animation, The A.V. Club journalist thought that its emphasis on the convergence of various science fiction techniques resulted in aesthetically pleasing visuals. VanDerWerff stated, "Everything about this one gleams, and it makes for an Archer that will almost certainly look great in HD." Furthermore, he adulated the episode's dialogue, avouching that even the characters with very limited screen time were given opportunities to shine with humor. Although Marcos Canales of Screen Invasion opined that "Space Race: Part I" contained far too many one-liners and jokes, he praised the storyline and was keen to the character progression of Lana. "Usually, she's the best agent ISIS has and can do pretty much anything," explained Canales, "so putting her in a situation where she was not a bad ass gave the character some added depth which is something most animated shows don't prioritize." Cinema Blend's Jesse Carp—despite criticizing the show's "nonsensical" narrative—declared it to be hilarious.

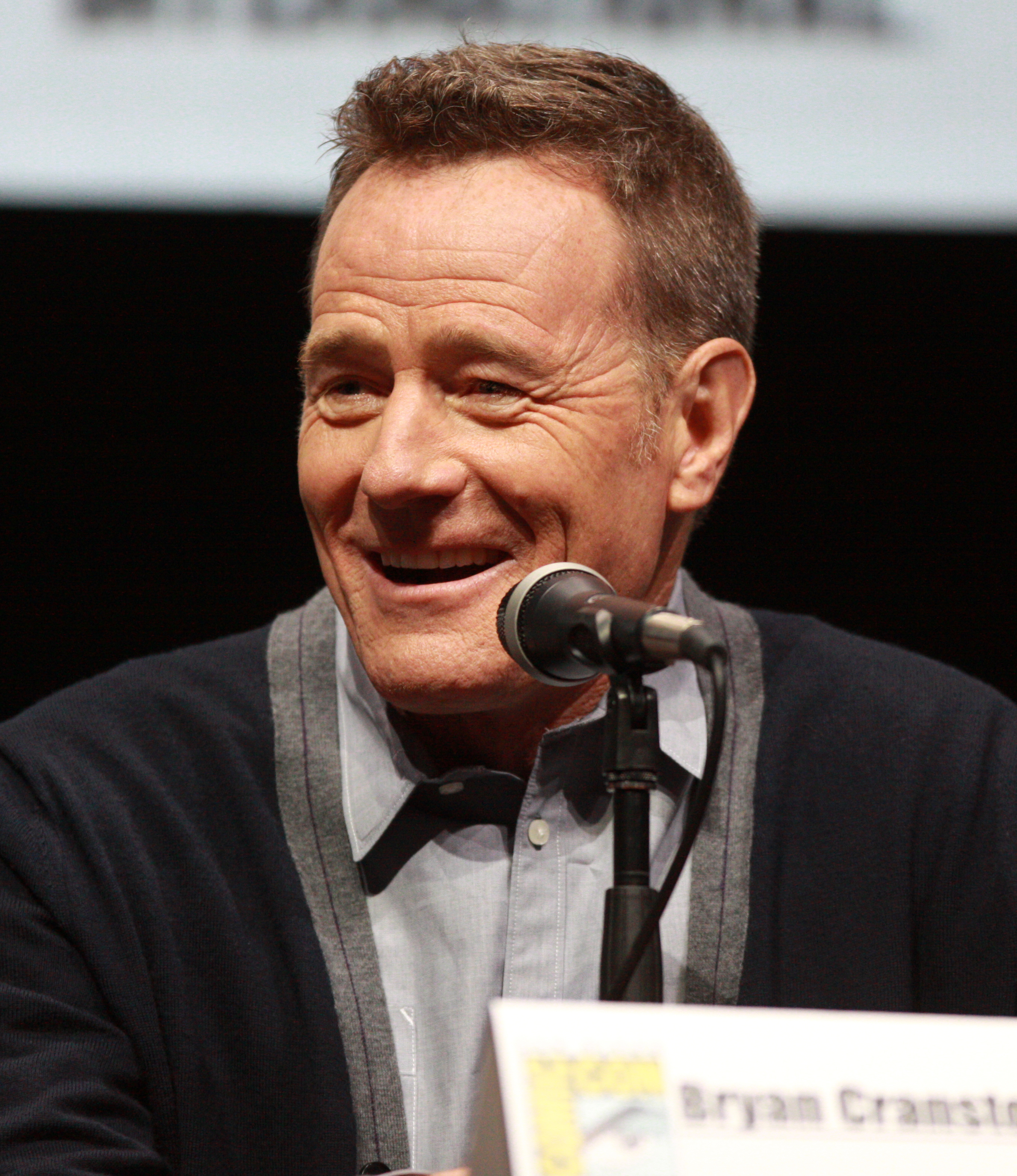
Breaking Bad actor Bryan Cranston (pictured) made a guest appearance on the installment. Cranston's acting was cited as a highlight by television critics.

Despite positive assessments, "Space Race: Part II" produced more variety within critical opinion. In his "commendable" 8.6 out of ten rating review, Ross Bonaime of Paste asserted that the program displayed some exceptional dimension into the characters—from Lana's apparent self-consciousness, to Cheryl's eccentric and "odd" persona, and Krieger's past. Ultimately, Bonaime professed that "Space Race: Part II" was slightly inferior to its predecessor; "'Space Race, Part II' doesn't have some of the big laughs that the first part featured. By that, I mean Archer never rode Cyril through waves of Lana's puke joyously. It is a step down from the first part comedically, but the episode does give us a few fun moments for each member of the cast." Analogous sentiments were echoed by Blair Marnell of CraveOnline, who concluded: "The space adventure had some fun moments, but it seemed to lack the punch provided by the two episodes that proceeded it. Even though it was good to see Barry again this season, his appearance in this episode seemed pretty tacked on." VanDerWerff affirmed that the episode was a superb conclusion to Archer's third season, despite not being as "relentlessly entertaining" as "Space Race: Part I". While deeming the episode as a hilarious finale, TV Overmind writer Kevin Fitzpatrick claimed that "Space Race: Part II" left many unanswered questions to the audience. Conversely, Eric Hochberger of TV Fanatic applauded the episode, issuing it a 4.7 out of 5 stars. "Archer ended its third season tonight with the conclusion to its two part episode, 'Space Race'. And, man, from the second Archer announced he left his light saber in his other space pants, you knew you were in for a solid ending."

Cranston's performance was a frequent topic in the critiques. Even prior to the airing of the episode, James Hibberd of Entertainment Weekly suggested that the actor's voice would be perfect for an animated television series. VanDerWerff and Carp were amongst the journalists who issued favorable assessments of Cranston's acting. Carp noted that "Cranston's work is even more impressive when you consider that he not only plays the hero and villain but manages to be funny as both." In addressing "Part II", Carp concluded that "as early as the stunning end of the world sequence, the actor plants the hint of suppressed craziness in Spaceman Drake and it was soon obvious that the just crew would not only be manning a mission to help him combat the mutineers but probably get wrapped up in this nut's dream to terra form Mars." For VanDerWerff, "Cranston is the very best kind of guest voice, fully inhabiting his character but also having a lot of fun with the jokes. It's a nice reminder of just how funny Cranston can be, and I hope he gets even more bizarre stuff to do next week." Jonah Gardner of Ology later said, "Bryan Cranston remains a god among men."
