= Archer season 3 =

Archer
- Season 3
- DVD cover
- Starring: H. Jon Benjamin; Judy Greer; Amber Nash; Chris Parnell; Aisha Tyler; Jessica Walter
- No. of episodes: 13

Release
- Original network: FX
- Original release: September 15, 2011 – March 22, 2012

Season chronology
- ← Previous; Season 2 Next → Season 4

The third season of the animated television series Archer originally aired in the United States on the cable network FX. The three part episode "Heart of Archness" aired from September 15, 2011, until September 29, 2011. The rest of the season started on January 19, 2012, with "The Man from Jupiter" and ended with the two part episode "Space Race" on March 16 and March 23, 2012, respectively, with a total of thirteen episodes.

== Overview ==
It was announced on March 29, 2011, that Archer was renewed for 16 more episodes. FX had originally intended the first three episodes of Season 3 to air in the fall of 2011 as a "Special Assignment" three-part event, with a further 13 episodes (a normal sized season for most FX shows) to air at the beginning of 2012. Series creator Adam Reed later clarified the situation. He explained that while FX had intended the second set of episodes to be 13 episodes, he had believed that he was only going to be producing a further 10 episodes (with the first three episodes completing the standard order of 13 episodes). While he attempted to produce the full 16 episodes after he realized his error, it soon became clear that it would be impossible to produce three additional episodes. The order was eventually reduced to 13 episodes.

== Episodes ==
No. overall	No. in season	Title	Written by	Original release date	Prod. code	US viewers (millions)
24	1	"Heart of Archness: Part I"	Adam Reed	September 15, 2011	XAR03001	1.17
Malory hires an adventurer named Rip Riley to find Archer, who has been missing since Katya Kasanova sacrificed herself to save Archer on their wedding day. Rip finds him on a tropical island, but Archer, who is still grieving, has no interest in leaving. Special guest stars: David Cross as Noah and Patrick Warburton as Rip Riley
25	2	"Heart of Archness: Part II"	Adam Reed	September 22, 2011	XAR03002	1.10
After being captured by pirates, Archer emerges as Pirate King, but he has bitten off more than he can chew, getting little help from his first mate, Noah. Meanwhile, his ISIS colleagues keep up their attempts to rescue him, sort of. Special guest stars: David Cross as Noah and Patrick Warbuton as Rip Riley
26	3	"Heart of Archness: Part III"	Adam Reed	September 29, 2011	XAR03003	1.19
Archer, Rip, Lana and Ray try to escape the island. Meanwhile, Cyril realizes he hid all the agency's money while drunk and has to find a way to get it back. Special guest stars: David Cross as Noah and Patrick Warbuton as Rip Riley
27	4	"The Man from Jupiter"	Adam Reed	January 19, 2012	XAR03005	1.31
Archer is overjoyed when he meets personal hero, Burt Reynolds, only to find out that Reynolds is dating his mother, Malory. Special guest star: Burt Reynolds as himself
28	5	"El Contador"	Story by : Tesha Kondrat; Teleplay by : Adam Reed	January 26, 2012	XAR03006	1.12
Against her other agents' wishes, Malory promotes Cyril to field agent and sends him with Archer and Lana to capture a drug lord, where they find out he might actually have a talent for it. Back at the office, Malory institutes a strict drug testing policy for her employees, forcing Pam, Cheryl, and Ray to use Dr. Krieger's purifying herbal tea to beat it. Its side effects, however, cause them to have horrifying hallucinations. Special guest star: Joaquim de Almeida as Román Calzado
29	6	"The Limited"	Adam Reed	February 2, 2012	XAR03007	1.06
ISIS helps The Royal Canadian Mounted Police capture a Canadian terrorist while on a high speed train. Malory finds out that the support staff have tagged along with Cheryl, and the terrorist escapes when Cyril leaves him alone. The agents have to search the train to find him, but Archer is more concerned with finding Cheryl's pet ocelot when it escapes. Special guest stars: Mike Smith as Mountie/Terrorist, John Paul Tremblay as Mountie/Terrorist, Robb Wells as Kenny Bilko and Dave Fennoy as George
30	7	"Drift Problem"	Adam Reed	February 9, 2012	XAR03008	1.22
When his birthday present of a spy car is stolen, Archer's quest to get it back leads to a conflict with the Yakuza. Special guest star: George Takei as "Mr. Moto"
31	8	"Lo Scandalo"	Adam Reed	February 16, 2012	XAR03004	1.20
Malory claims to have been framed for killing her long-time lover, the Italian prime minister, and the gang have to help her cover up the crime fast.
32	9	"Bloody Ferlin"	Adam Reed	February 23, 2012	XAR03010	1.27
Archer and Lana discover that Ray has been faking his paralysis all along when he's caught stealing weapons from ISIS. Ray needs to help his drug-dealing (or 'Farming') brother which leads to a trip to Ray's backwoods hometown of Ferlin, West Virginia where Ray has Cheryl pose as his wife. Special guest stars: Paula Malcomson as Janelle, Jack McBrayer as Randy Gillette and Michael Rooker as Sheriff E.Z. Ponder
33	10	"Crossing Over"	Adam Reed	March 1, 2012	XAR03009	1.07
When Barry becomes the head of the KGB, Jakov decides to defect to the U.S. with ISIS protecting. Archer finds himself in a relationship with a woman who gives him the best sex of his life: Pam.
34	11	"Skin Game"	Chris Provenzano & Adam Reed	March 8, 2012	XAR03011	1.04
Krieger revives Katya as a cyborg but Archer is jarred by her inhuman nature despite his love for her. Barry comes back for revenge by taking Katya from Archer. Special guest star: Ona Grauer as Katya Kazanova
35	12	"Space Race: Part I"	Adam Reed	March 15, 2012	XAR03012	1.16
The team (including Malory but not Pam and Cheryl/Carol) receive emergency Space Training; before heading to The Danger Zone, this time an international space station called Horizon where murderous mutineers have apparently gained control. While in transit Pam and Cheryl are discovered to have been stowed by Archer who continues to have his affair with Pam. Special guest star: Bryan Cranston as Commander Tony Drake
36	13	"Space Race: Part II"	Adam Reed	March 22, 2012	XAR03013	1.33
Archer and the rest of ISIS are held captive by mutineers on the Space Station Horizon. Special guest star: Bryan Cranston as Commander Tony Drake

== Home media ==
Archer: The Complete Season Three
Set details	Special features	
13 episodes; 2-disc set; 16:9 aspect ratio; Languages: English; Subtitles; English; Spanish	Commentary on "El Contador"; Commentary on "Drift Problem"; Commentary on "Lo Scandalo"; "Heart of Archness" Extended Version; Gator 2 Trailer; Answering Machine Messages; Cooking with Archer	
DVD release dates
Region 1	Region 2	Region 4
January 8, 2013	March 25, 2013	TBA
