= Archer season 5 =

Archer Vice
- Season 5
- DVD cover
- Starring: H. Jon Benjamin; Judy Greer; Amber Nash; Chris Parnell; Aisha Tyler; Lucky Yates; Jessica Walter
- No. of episodes: 13

Release
- Original network: FX
- Original release: January 13 – April 21, 2014

Season chronology
- ← Previous; Season 4 Next → Season 6

Archer Vice is the fifth season of the animated television series Archer, created by Adam Reed. Consisting of thirteen episodes, it aired in the United States on the cable network FX from January 13 to April 21, 2014.

== Production ==
On February 27, 2013, FX renewed Archer for a fifth season.

This season transitions to a new format, moving away from revolving around a spy agency (after it is revealed ISIS was never sanctioned by the U.S. government), to depicting the characters embarking on a life of crime as they attempt to sell cocaine.

Season 5 was officially dubbed Archer Vice in the opening credits sequence of the second episode, though it is 'named' by Archer after the closing montage of the first episode (which is presented to imply Archer musing on what he sees happening in the following months). It was the first season to move away from an episodic format in favor of a serial storyline that played out over the course of all ten episodes. This trend would continue in future seasons with Adam Reed having said that he had grown tired of the show’s format being “mission of the week.”

== Episodes ==
No. overall	No. in season	Title	Written by	Original release date	Prod. code	US viewers (millions)
50	1	"White Elephant"	Adam Reed	January 13, 2014	XAR05001	1.65
ISIS is raided and disbanded by the U.S. government when it transpires that the agency was never sanctioned by them. Cyril, Pam, Cheryl, Krieger and Ray promptly spill the beans about all of ISIS's operations, while Lana and Archer creatively break out of custody, only to find that Malory has managed to get everyone off the hook, on the condition that ISIS be dismantled immediately. As the staff discuss what they all plan to do next, Archer reveals a hidden vault containing a ton of cocaine and Lana sarcastically suggests that they form a cartel. The episode ends with a montage of scenes from the rest of the season. Special guest stars: Gary Cole as Special Agent Hawley, Fred Armisen as Gustavo Calderon, Thomas Lennon as Charles and Blake Perlman as La Madrina
51	2	"A Kiss While Dying"	Adam Reed	January 20, 2014	XAR05002	1.17
Disguised as a doctor and nurse, Archer and Lana take twenty kilos of cocaine - hidden in plaster covering Pam's entire body - to a deal with an unknown buyer. A nervous and sweaty Pam absorbs cocaine through her skin and ends up addicted - to the point of eating the plaster/cocaine body cast. They then meet with the buyer, who turns out to be Ramon. Ramon is making the buy on behalf of Rudy and Charles, all three last seen in the Season 1 episode "Honeypot." As the deal turns increasingly sour and all three buyers wind up dead, it is revealed in the final scene that it was an elaborate ruse to steal the cocaine from ISIS, pretend to be dead to throw suspicion, and to have paid ISIS in counterfeit bills. Meanwhile, Cheryl is beginning her goal of becoming a country music star, performing the original song "40 Miles of Mountain Road" in the background of the episode. Singer Jessy Lynn Martens provides her vocals. While horrible in rehearsals, it's discovered that when no one is watching her, Cheryl is an amazing singer, pushing Malory to become her agent. Special guest stars: Thomas Lennon as Charles and Ron Perlman as Ramon Limon
52	3	"A Debt of Honor"	Adam Reed	January 27, 2014	XAR05003	1.13
The gang decides to use the counterfeit money to buy guns, but Pam takes it instead to buy amphetamines from the Yakuza. They trace Pam down (as she had left a full and detailed listing of living at Cheryl's mansion at her old apartment) as the Yakuza boss, Mr. Moto, demands the drugs be returned. He also wants Pam's head, and despite Cheryl offering to pay him, he still refuses. Cheryl reveals she has an entire arsenal of old-fashioned weapons the team uses to defend the mansion from Yakuza attackers. They manage to use the tunnels built under the mansion by one of Cheryl's crazy uncles to escape, and Archer cuts a deal with Moto to give away 5 million dollars' worth of cocaine to even things up. Ron is shot and wounded in the attack and, as he's taken to the hospital, he refuses to support Malory's criminal lifestyle. Special guest stars: Ron Leibman as Ron Cadillac and George Takei as Mr. Moto
53	4	"House Call"	Adam Reed	February 3, 2014	XAR05004	1.13
As the gang discusses their diminishing coke supply and sending Pam to rehab, an FBI agent knocks on the door. Because he was invited in by Woodhouse, the gang fears their coke pile will incriminate them under the plain view doctrine. Everyone scrambles to distract the FBI agent. The agent is fooled into leaving, and a computer chip is installed into Cheryl to remove her anxiety and allow her to become a country singer. Special guest stars: Gary Cole as Special Agent Hawley and Ron Leibman as Ron Cadillac
54	5	"Southbound and Down"	Adam Reed & Ben Hoffman	February 24, 2014	XAR05005	1.05
With Cherlene on the verge of discovery, Archer pays for an extravagant tour bus to get the gang to Texas for her debut performance. Things go off the rails when he lets slip to Pam that a shipment of cocaine has been smuggled onto the bus for distribution over state lines.
55	6	"Baby Shower"	Adam Reed	March 3, 2014	XAR05009	0.95
With Krieger operating an online pharmacy to distribute the cocaine to buyers, the gang has the free time to throw a neglected Lana a baby shower. Archer takes Pam along for backup on a trip to the Tuntmore Hotel to secure a very special shower gift: a performance by Kenny Loggins. Special guest star: Kenny Loggins as himself
56	7	"Smugglers' Blues"	Adam Reed	March 10, 2014	XAR05006	0.87
Without Malory's knowledge or permission, Archer takes some of the cocaine to South America, dragging Cyril and Ray along. Archer plans to simply ask around to find a drug lord named La Madrina and give her the cocaine as a sample for more. He ends up in bed with La Madrina only to discover that she's an undercover police officer who sends the trio to jail without backup. Special guest star: Blake Perlman as La Madrina
57	8	"The Rules of Extraction"	Adam Reed	March 17, 2014	XAR05007	1.08
When the jeep carrying them crashes, Archer, Cyril and Ray (who has supposedly become paralyzed yet again) have to navigate their way through a jungle river, forcing Archer to confront his fear of crocodiles. Seeing Malory frantic about Archer, Lana tries to give her a "spa day" overseen by Pam and Cherlene.
58	9	"On the Carpet"	Adam Reed	March 24, 2014	XAR05008	0.91
Archer avoids crash landing in a dangerous swamp only to come face-to-face with a shady arms dealer. They manage to escape back to New York with a slate of illegal arms meant to be sent to a Central American country in civil war and Malory decides to sell the arms for money after discovering Krieger wasted the last of the cocaine on a failed submarine experiment. Special guest stars: Christian Slater as Slater and Fred Armisen as Gustavo Calderon
59	10	"Palace Intrigue: Part I"	Adam Reed	March 31, 2014	XAR05010	0.92
Archer and the rest of the ISIS gang are the guests of Gustavo Calderon, dictator of fictional Central American country San Marcos, and his wife Juliana. Calderon is a big fan of Cherlene, but Juliana is a bigger fan of Archer, seducing him while disguised as a maid. Special guest stars: Fred Armisen as Gustavo Calderon and Lauren Cohan as Juliana Calderon
60	11	"Palace Intrigue: Part II"	Adam Reed	April 7, 2014	XAR05011	0.87
Archer tries to keep his fling with the dictator's wife a secret while Krieger bonds with his clone-brothers. Cyril, at the request of Malory to find an escape vehicle, steals a tank from Calderon's stockpile and uses it to force Calderon and his troops to surrender to him. Special guest stars: Fred Armisen as Gustavo Calderon and Lauren Cohan as Juliana Calderon
61	12	"Filibuster"	Adam Reed	April 14, 2014	XAR05012	1.07
Cyril becomes the new president of San Marcos and forcibly takes Juliana as his wife, Cherlene becomes the first lady of country music, and Archer becomes a resistance fighter. Calderon is killed by a tiger after Cherlene lets it loose from Calderon's zoo. Lana's water breaks. Special guest stars: Christian Slater as Slater, Lauren Cohan as Juliana Calderon, Gary Cole as Special Agent Hawley and Fred Armisen as Gustavo Calderon
62	13	"Arrivals/Departures"	Adam Reed	April 21, 2014	XAR05013	0.68
Archer and later Malory and Pam help Lana with the delivery of her baby while Krieger, who after fighting and defeating his clones does not sufficiently prove to Ray that he isn't one of the clones, and Ray try to prevent the launch of a deadly nerve gas rocket. Cyril is dethroned as 'leader' of San Marcos while Malory forces him and Pam to steal as many valuables from Calderon's mansion as possible. Krieger decides to take the nerve gas canister out of the rocket before it launches and reveals that Cherlene's brain chip was a placebo. Malory negotiates an underhanded deal with the CIA to reactivate ISIS (involving the CIA taking the nerve gas). Lana reveals to Archer that he is the father of her baby girl since she took a sample of his sperm due to his physical specimen and her attraction to him. Special guest stars: Christian Slater as Slater, Lauren Cohan as Juliana Calderon, and Gary Cole as Special Agent Hawley

== Home media ==
Archer Vice: The Complete Season Five
Set details	Special features	
13 episodes; 2-disc set; 16:9 aspect ratio; Languages: English; Subtitles; English; Spanish; French	"Midnight Blues" Music Video by Cheryl Tunt; Cheryl Tunt Interview on Wake Up Country; Old MacDonald Pam Poovey Had a Farm, The Musical	
DVD release dates
Region 1	Region 2	Region 4
January 6, 2015	TBA	TBA
