= The Man from Jupiter =

- Archer episode
- Episode no.: Season 3 Episode 4
- Directed by: Adam Reed
- Written by: Adam Reed
- Production code: XAR03005
- Original air date: January 19, 2012

Guest appearance
- Burt Reynolds as himself

Episode chronology
← Previous "Heart of Archness"	Next → "El Contador"
- Archer (season 3)

"The Man from Jupiter" is the fourth episode of the third season of the American animated television series Archer. It originally aired on January 19, 2012, in the United States on FX. Sterling Archer (H. Jon Benjamin) is introduced to Burt Reynolds, who is involved in a relationship with his mother Malory Archer (Jessica Walter). Sterling tries several attempts to end their relationship. Meanwhile, a group of Cuban hitmen set out to kill Sterling.

The episode was directed and written by series creator Adam Reed. Reynolds was announced as a guest star for the episode in October 2011. He edited much of the episode's script, after receiving it from Reed. "The Man from Jupiter" was well received by television commentators, who praised the episode's cultural references, character development, and the storylines. Upon airing, it attracted 1.309 million viewers and a 0.7 rating in the 18–49 demographic, according to Nielsen ratings. It subsequently became the eleventh highest-rated cable program of the day.

This is Burt Reynolds' last TV appearance (excluding talk shows and commercials) before his death in September 2018 and also his last voice-over appearance.

== Plot ==
Sterling Archer (H. Jon Benjamin) drinks at a bar and after he unsuccessfully attempts to pick up a woman for sex, a man nearby laughs at Archer's incident. When Sterling threatens him, the man easily subdues him. Sterling suddenly realizes that the man is his idol, Burt Reynolds. After gushing to Burt about how much of a fan he is, Archer learns that—much to his shock—Burt is dating his mother Malory Archer (Jessica Walter). A shocked Sterling passes out in the establishment, and by the next day is seen with a black eye. Sterling assumes that it was an "involuntary reaction".

Malory informs Sterling that a group of Cuban hitmen have established a warrant against him, which makes Sterling even more irate. Burt then calls Malory and asks her out to a movie premiere that night. Later that day, however, Malory gets a letter from Reynolds, saying that he is leaving her for a younger woman and moving back "to Tinseltown". However, Lana Kane (Aisha Tyler) quickly figures out that the letter was written by Sterling himself (citing how no star actor uses the term "Tinseltown"). She quickly figures out that Sterling visited Burt, knocking him out with knock-out gas, and taking him to his apartment. Lana, along with Cyril Figgis (Chris Parnell) and Ray Gillette (Adam Reed), go to try to reason with Sterling. Once there, they encounter the Cuban hit squad, who believe Gillette is the real Sterling based on the recon photo they have (taken during the events of "Honeypot") and a firefight begins. Meanwhile, Sterling holds Burt hostage, promising to never let him date his mother again, but he is interrupted by the firefight between the ISIS agents and the Cubans. As they drive off, Sterling prepares to go after them, but Burt says that Sterling won't be able to catch up to them and that he can. Sterling agrees to a bet: If Burt can't catch up to them, he will leave for Hollywood and never call Malory again, and if he does, he can be allowed to continue dating Malory.

What follows is a hectic car chase that frightens Sterling some, despite Burt's expert driving that allows him to achieve many Hollywood driving stunts. During this, Burt tells Sterling that he needs to stop thinking of Malory as just his mother and rather think of her as a person with her own emotional (and sexual) needs and that he should think about her happiness and not his. This seems to sway Sterling and at that point, Burt has been able to catch up to the ISIS agents and the Cubans and saves the ISIS agents. The then group drives back to a heartbroken Malory. Sterling apologizes for writing the phony letter and Burt takes Malory on their date to the movie premiere.

== Production ==
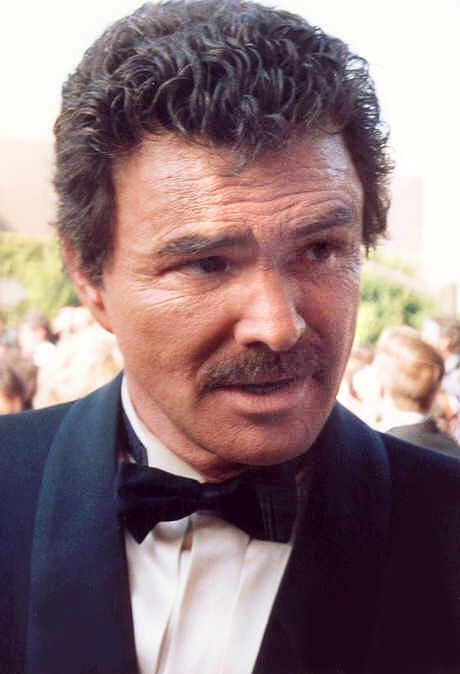
Burt Reynolds guest appeared on the episode as himself.

Burt Reynolds makes a guest appearance on "The Man from Jupiter", as the love interest of Malory Archer. His guest appearance was formally announced in October 2011. Prior to his appearance, Reynolds was referenced in several episodes of the series. Series creator Adam Reed opined: "I think the only person on the planet who's a bigger fan of Burt Reynolds than me is Sterling Archer. Archer constantly tries to imitate Burt and always raves about Burt's movies and all-around awesomeness. So to have Burt recording voice-overs for the show was just amazing." After receiving the episode's script from Reed, Reynolds made several edits; while editing the script of the episode, Reynolds added a scene in which Sterling reveals that his career choice was largely influenced by his films. "We sent him the script beforehand and he noted the script up pretty good. But it was all to make it more self-deprecating." Reed, a fan of Reynolds, said that working with him was a great experience. "It was such a surreal experience being in the room with Burt Reynolds, my childhood hero," he affirmed. "Just hearing him read the stuff that I wrote, it was pretty great."

The episode title is a reference to the television series The Man from U.N.C.L.E. and the town of Jupiter, Florida, which is where Reynolds spent most of his childhood. Sterling proclaims that his career path was largely influenced by Reynolds' film career, particularly his work in the musical film At Long Last Love (1975) and the spy cinema Operation C.I.A. (1965). Reed stated, "Archer says [that] Operation C.I.A. is why [he] became a spy. And [Reynolds is] like, 'Really, I thought that movie sucked.'" A sequence which features Sterling strapping Reynolds onto a handtruck reflects homage to the thriller film The Silence of the Lambs (1991). The song "East Bound and Down" by Jerry Reed is presented in the episode, while Sterling makes several references to several American cinematic works from the 1970s. Jesse Carp of Cinema Blend wrote: "I should start by saying that this episode played particularly well for me because I’m a huge fan of 1970s American cinema—the good and the bad—so all of those references that Archer soon starts throwing at Reynolds, I'm catching and loving every second of it." "The Man from Jupiter" contains several scenes that are reminiscent to those in the action film Gator (1976). Carp wrote that "it isn't long before the Reynolds' sweet talking and charisma mesmerizes Archer and soon the pair are talking plot possibilities for the last film in the Gator trilogy."

== Reception ==
=== Ratings ===
"The Man from Jupiter" was originally broadcast on January 19, 2012, in the United States on FX. Upon airing, it attained 1.309 million viewers and a 0.7 rating in the 18–49 demographic, according to Nielsen ratings. The installment became the eleventh high-rated cable television program of the day, scoring higher than the documentary series The First 48 on A&E but obtaining lower ratings than the satirical television program The Daily Show on Comedy Central. "The Man from Jupiter" achieved record-breaking demographic ratings; it became the third-most viewed cable telecast of all time amongst men in the 18–34 demographic, as well as key men in the 18–49 group. In comparison to the season two premiere, "Swiss Miss", ratings in the 18–49 demographic during the first fifteen minutes vaulted 31% to 689,000 viewers. Although ratings showed similar increases during the second quarterly hour, ratings in the 18–49 demographic declined 21% from the previous season premiere, translating to 220,000 viewers. Overall, ratings amongst key adults in the 18–49 group declined 4% from "Swiss Miss" to 950,000.

=== Critical response ===
"The Man from Jupiter" was widely lauded by television commentators. In her A− review, Emily VanDerWerff of The A.V. Club felt that the episode contained many great moments and felt that it was a strong opening for the season. VanDerWerff wrote: "Archer has always been a show I enjoyed more for the fast-paced dialogue and weird office plots, but every so often, the show does something pretty awesome, even on what's probably a fairly limited budget, and it turns out an action sequence that you just won't see on most other animated shows. FX has usually chosen to open seasons with these big action episodes, for fairly obvious reasons, and this one has the added benefit of Burt Reynolds hanging out as another potential ratings bump." VanDerWerff noted that the storyline between Sterling Archer and his mother Malory Archer was the highlight of "The Man from Jupiter"; "Archer's so often at odds with her because he's unable to see her as a person and not just his mother, as Reynolds expresses while roaring down the highway at dangerously high speeds. Until Archer accepts that Malory has needs—some of them sexual—he’s always going to be trapped in a weird, co-dependent relationship with her. Archer isn't a show that tries to shove tons and tons of deep character moments into its episodes, which makes it all the better when it does do so. The show usually nails those little moments, and this was no exception." Creative Loafing journalist Scott Harrel asserted, "If the debut episode is any indication, you can expect another satisfying season from this intelligent, imaginative and button-pushing mix of high and low humor." Ross Bonaime of Paste issued the installment an 8.8 out of ten rating, signifying a "commendable" rating. Bonaime affirmed that Reed adequately developed the characters, citing that "The Man from Jupiter" further established greater expectations for the series.

Carp evaluated the script as "impeccably written", adding that "The Man from Jupiter" was a hilarious episode. Cites of adulation stemmed from the animation, which Carp described it as "likely the best you'll see anywhere on television." He wrote, "It's just so unique the way they use state of the art 3D computer animation to create a retrofitted look. It takes them months to animate each episode and the hard work really pays off in the unique visuals of the show." Writing for TV Fanatic, Eric Hochberger stated that "if this week combined with the mini-series was any indication, we're in for a damn strong season of Archer."

Reynolds' appearance was critically acclaimed. VanDerWerff professed that she was surprised that it was executed well, as she avouched that shows featuring guest appearances ruin the chemistry of the main cast. "Episodes with big special guest stars can often ruin the rhythm of the main gang, but I was surprised at how readily the show incorporated Reynolds into the storyline, to the point where he almost felt like an organic part of the ensemble," avouched VanDerWerff. "The fact that he's still dating Malory at the end of the episode implies that he might pop back in as the season proceeds, and I wouldn't be adverse to that happening, where many special guest stars might make me roll my eyes in irritation." She praised the chemistry between Reynolds and Benjamin, and commended Reynolds for having the will power to poke fun at himself. Carp echoed similar sentiments; "H. Jon Benjamin alone is a voice-over superstar [...] but combined with Reynolds and the rest of the cast, that was some animated magic and a fantastic way to kick off the third season." Bonaime thought that Reynolds was "fine with being self-deprecating, and he gives some fantastic moments with Archer." HitFix's Alan Sepinwall enjoyed how Reynolds was utilized in "The Man from Jupiter". "There are times when it can feel awkward when a show spends an episode sucking up to a very special guest star, but it worked here because so much of Archer's personality—and so much of the show's approach to action—feels inspired by all those movies Reynolds did in the '70s and early '80s when he was the biggest movie star in the world.
