= Lucky Yates =

American actor

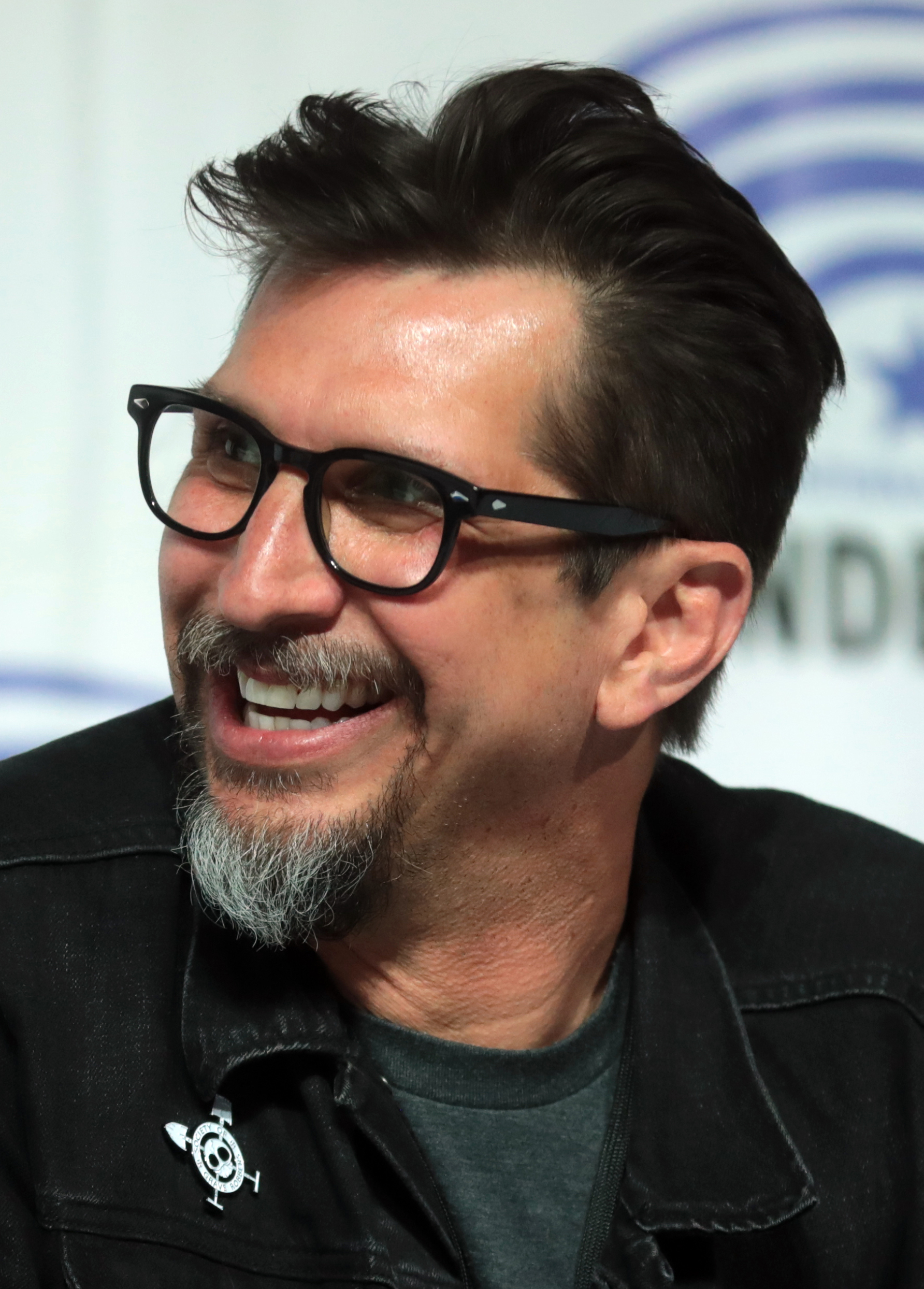
Yates at the 2019 WonderCon.

Matt "Lucky" Yates (born October 18, 1967) is an American actor and comedian. He is known for his voice roles as Dr. Krieger on Archer and the Xtacles on Frisky Dingo. He was also a recurring actor on the Food Network series Good Eats. He studied theater at Wayne State University and regularly performs at Dad's Garage in Atlanta, Georgia.

From 2000 to 2007, he hosted The Lucky Yates Talk Show, a live on-stage weekly talk show in Atlanta, Georgia.

In 2016, Yates was hired as a host for the film streaming service from Turner Classic Movies and The Criterion Collection, FilmStruck.

in 2021, Yates coauthored the comic Lester of the Lesser Gods with artist Eric Powell.

== Filmography ==
=== Film ===
Year	Title	Role	Notes
1999	The Adventures of Elmo in Grouchland	Additional Muppet Performer	Voice; credited as Matt Yates
2017	Axis	Radio Host	Voice
2021	America: The Motion Picture	Baseball Announcer / 2nd Amendment Rights Activist	Voice

=== Television ===
Year	Title	Role	Notes
2003–12	Good Eats	Various	Documentary
2006–07	Frisky Dingo	The Xtacles	Voice, 3 episodes
2010–23	Archer	Algernop Krieger, Aaron Leibowitz, Crackers, Krieger Clones	Voice, main role (103 episodes)
2016	Hidden America with Jonah Ray	Cop	Episode: "Atlanta: Past, Present, Living, and Dead"
2021	Cake	Demon Skull	Episode: "The Skull"
2024	Exploding Kittens	Additional voices	Voice, 9 episodes

=== Internet ===
Year	Title	Role	Notes
2005, 2018	Homestar Runner	Blue Knight/Himself	2 episodes
2021	Stitch of Fate	Boxferatu	1 episode
