= 19th Independent Spirit Awards =

US film awards ceremony in 2004

- Date: February 28, 2004
- Site: U.S.
- Hosted by: John Waters

Highlights
- Best Film: Lost in Translation
- Most awards: Lost in Translation (4)
- Most nominations: In America (6)

The 19th Independent Spirit Awards, honoring the best in independent filmmaking for 2003, were announced on February 28, 2004. It was hosted by John Waters.

== Nominees and winners ==
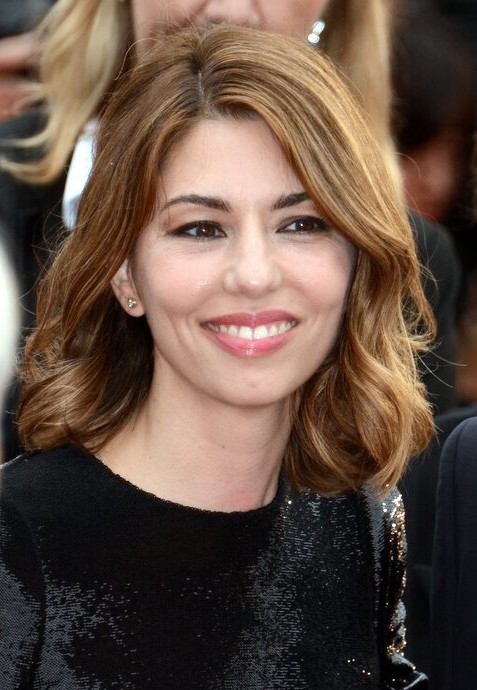
Sofia Coppola, winner of Best Director and Best Screenplay

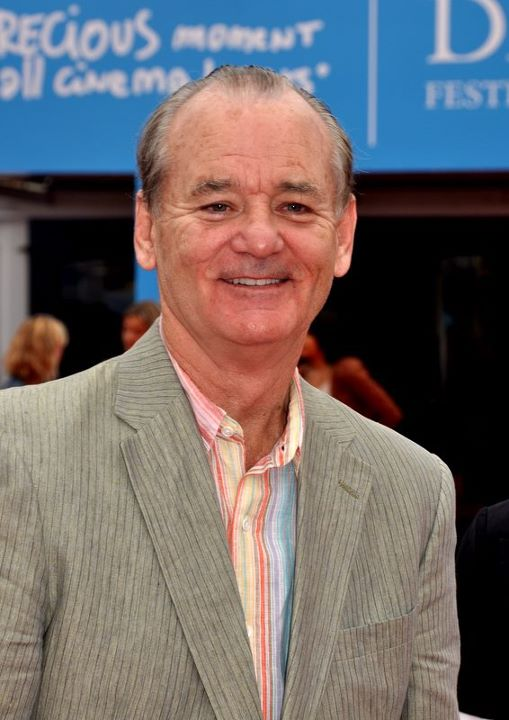
Bill Murray, winner of Best Male Lead

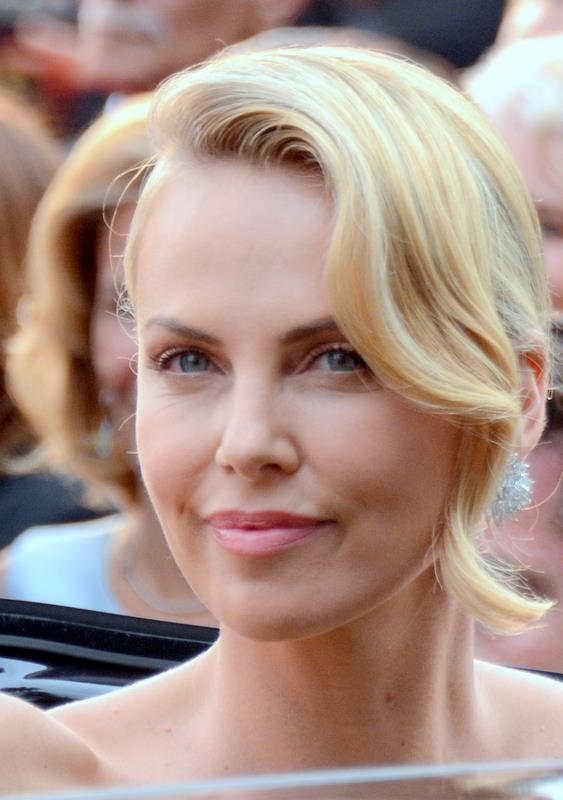
Charlize Theron, winner of Best Female Lead

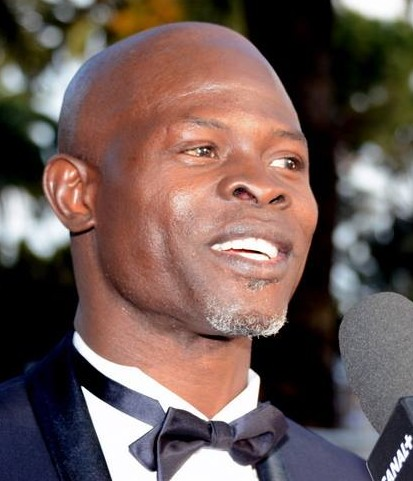
Djimon Hounsou, winner of Best Supporting Male

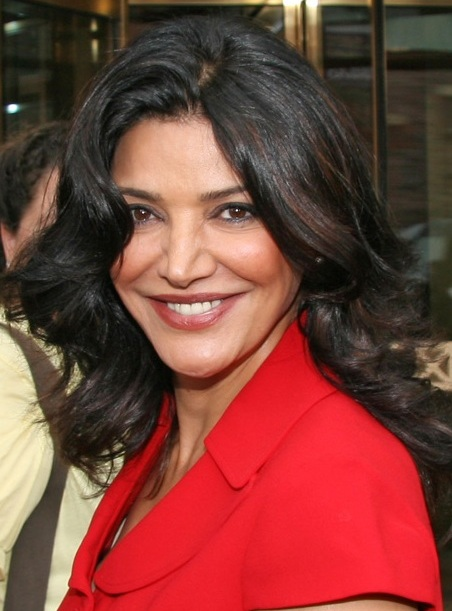
Shohreh Aghdashloo, winner of Best Supporting Female

Best Feature	Best Director
Lost in Translation: American Splendor; In America; Raising Victor Vargas; Shattered Glass	Sofia Coppola – Lost in Translation: Shari Springer Berman and Robert Pulcini – American Splendor; Jim Sheridan – In America; Peter Sollett – Raising Victor Vargas; Gus Van Sant – Elephant
Best Male Lead	Best Female Lead
Bill Murray – Lost in Translation: Peter Dinklage – The Station Agent; Paul Giamatti – American Splendor; Ben Kingsley – House of Sand and Fog; Lee Pace – Soldier's Girl	Charlize Theron – Monster: Agnes Bruckner – Blue Car; Zooey Deschanel – All the Real Girls; Samantha Morton – In America; Elisabeth Moss – Virgin
Best Supporting Male	Best Supporting Female
Djimon Hounsou – In America: Judah Friedlander – American Splendor; Troy Garity – Soldier's Girl; Alessandro Nivola – Laurel Canyon; Peter Sarsgaard – Shattered Glass	Shohreh Aghdashloo – House of Sand and Fog: Sarah Bolger – In America; Patricia Clarkson – Pieces of April; Hope Davis – The Secret Lives of Dentists; Frances McDormand – Laurel Canyon
Best Screenplay	Best First Screenplay
Lost in Translation – Sofia Coppola: American Splendor – Shari Springer Berman and Robert Pulcini; A Mighty Wind – Christopher Guest, Eugene Levy (and the rest of the cast); Pieces of April – Peter Hedges; Shattered Glass – Billy Ray	The Station Agent – Tom McCarthy: Blue Car – Karen Moncrieff; Monster – Patty Jenkins; Raising Victor Vargas – Peter Sollett and Eva Vives; Thirteen – Catherine Hardwicke and Nikki Reed
Best First Feature	Best Debut Performance
Monster: Bomb the System; House of Sand and Fog; Quattro Noza; Thirteen	Nikki Reed – Thirteen: Anna Kendrick – Camp; Judy Marte – Raising Victor Vargas; Victor Rasuk – Raising Victor Vargas; Janice Richardson – Anne B. Real
Best Cinematography	Best Documentary Feature
In America – Declan Quinn: Elephant – Harris Savides; Northfork – M. David Mullen; Quattro Noza – Derek Cianfrance; Shattered Glass – Mandy Walker	The Fog of War: Mayor of the Sunset Strip; My Architect; OT: Our Town; Power Trip
Best Foreign Film
Whale Rider • New Zealand: City of God • Brazil; Lilya 4-Ever • Denmark; The Magdalene Sisters • England/Ireland; The Triplets of Belleville • France

== Special awards ==
=== John Cassavetes Award ===
The Station Agent

- Anne B. Real
- Better Luck Tomorrow
- Pieces of April
- Virgin

=== Truer Than Fiction Award ===
Lost Boys of Sudan

- Flag Wars
- My Architect
- The Same River Twice

=== Producers Award ===
Mary Jane Skalski – The Jimmy Show and The Station Agent

- Callum Greene and Anthony Katagas – Happy Here and Now and Homework
- Lauren Moews – Cabin Fever and Briar Patch

=== Someone to Watch Award ===
Andrew Bujalski – Funny Ha Ha

- Ben Coccio – Zero Day
- Ryan Eslinger – Madness and Genius

=== Special Distinction Award ===
- 21 Grams

== Films with multiple wins and nominations ==
=== Films with multiple nominations ===
Nominations	Film
6	In America
5	American Splendor
5	Raising Victor Vargas
4	Lost in Translation
4	Shattered Glass
3	House of Sand and Fog
3	Monster
3	Pieces of April
3	Thirteen
2	Anne B. Real
2	Blue Car
2	Elephant
2	My Architect
2	Soldier's Girl

=== Films with multiple wins ===
Nominations	Film
4	Lost in Translation
3	The Station Agent
2	In America
2	Monster
