= Rasuk =

Rasuk is a surname. Notable people with the surname include:

- Silvestre Rasuk (born 1987), American actor
- Victor Rasuk (born 1984), American actor
