= Melonie Diaz =

American actress

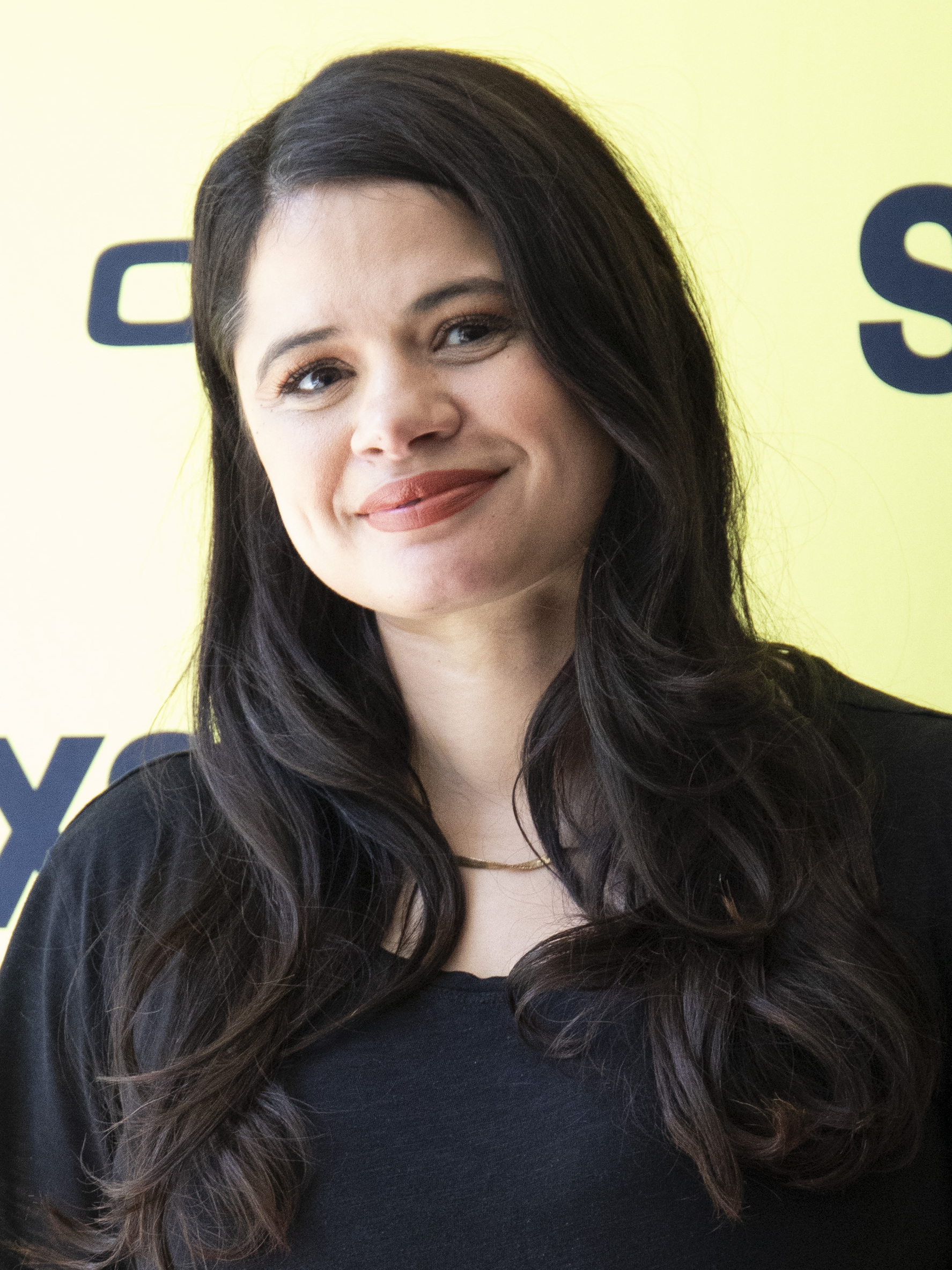
- Diaz in 2024
- Born: April 25, 1984 (age 42); New York City, New York, U.S.
- Education: Tisch School of the Arts
- Occupation: Actress
- Years active: 2001–present
- Notable credit: Mel Vera in Charmed
- Spouse: Octavio Genera (m. 2020)
- Children: 1

Melonie Diaz (born April 25, 1984) is an American actress who has appeared in many independent films, including four shown at the 2008 Sundance Film Festival. She received Independent Spirit Awards nominations for performances in films A Guide to Recognizing Your Saints (2006) and Fruitvale Station (2013). From 2018 to 2022, she appeared as one of the main roles as Mel Vera on the remake television series Charmed on The CW.

== Early life ==
Diaz was born in New York City, and was raised along with her elder sister on the Lower East Side ("Loisaida" or Alphabet City, Manhattan), by parents of Puerto Rican descent. She became interested in acting at the Henry Street Settlement and subsequently attended the Professional Performing Arts School in Manhattan.

She completed a degree in Film Production at New York University's Tisch School of the Arts, and has made numerous off-Broadway and workshop appearances including Medea at Bullet Space, the Hip Hop Theater Festival at P.S. 122, and the New York City Fringe Festival.

== Career ==
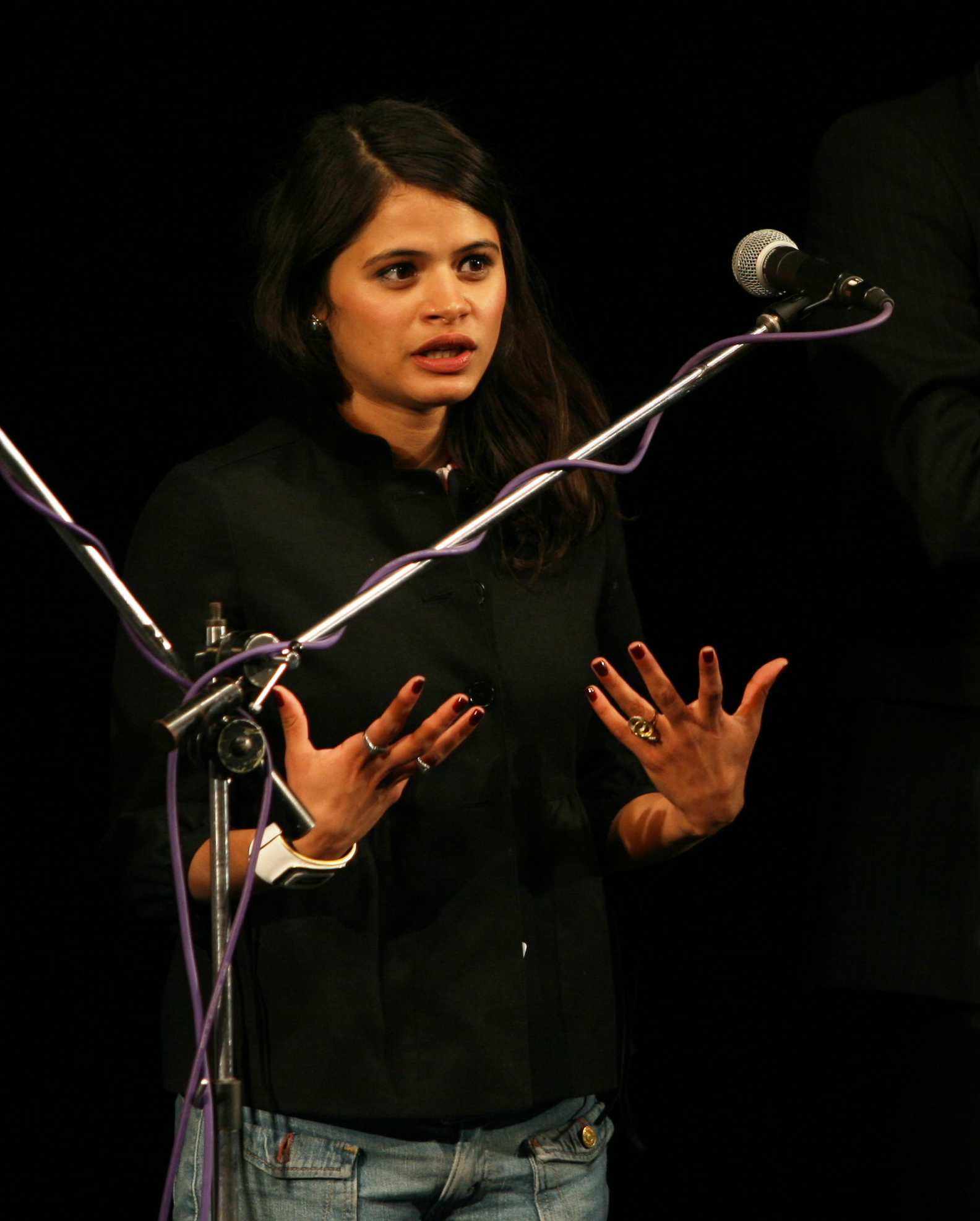
Diaz introducing the film Be Kind Rewind at the 2008 Karlovy Vary International Film Festival

She started her film career with a supporting role in Tom DiCillo's Double Whammy (2001) and later landed roles in Jim McKay and Hannah Weyer's From an Objective Point of View and Peter Sollett's Raising Victor Vargas (both 2002). Television work at this time included an episode of Law & Order and a pilot for Queens Supreme (both 2003).

Her breakthrough roles came as Blanca in Catherine Hardwicke's Lords of Dogtown (2005) and as Laurie in Dito Montiel's A Guide to Recognizing Your Saints (2006) which earned her an Independent Spirit Awards nomination for Best Supporting Female. She was subsequently cast by Jamie Babbit in the lead role of Anna in Itty Bitty Titty Committee (2007) as well as roles in Hamlet 2, Be Kind Rewind, and American Son in 2008.

She appeared in the Mary J. Blige video "We Got Hood Love" which debuted on May 10, 2010.

In 2012, she starred in the indie romantic comedy, She Wants Me with Josh Gad and Kristen Ruhlin. In a hyped-up, Woody Allen, Annie Hall-type film, she plays a girl who gets caught in a love triangle between aspiring artists and a celebrity.

In 2013, she appeared in Fruitvale Station, a film based on the shooting of Oscar Grant. The film premiered at the 2013 Sundance Film Festival, where it earned the U.S. Grand Jury Prize: Dramatic and the Audience Award: U.S. Dramatic. The film had its international premiere at the 2013 Cannes Film Festival, where it played in the Un Certain Regard section and won the Un Certain Regard Best First Film award. For her work in the movie she was nominated for an Independent Spirit Award for Best Supporting Female.

She has expressed a desire to return to Tisch in order to complete her degree in filmmaking, citing director Kathryn Bigelow as an inspiration.

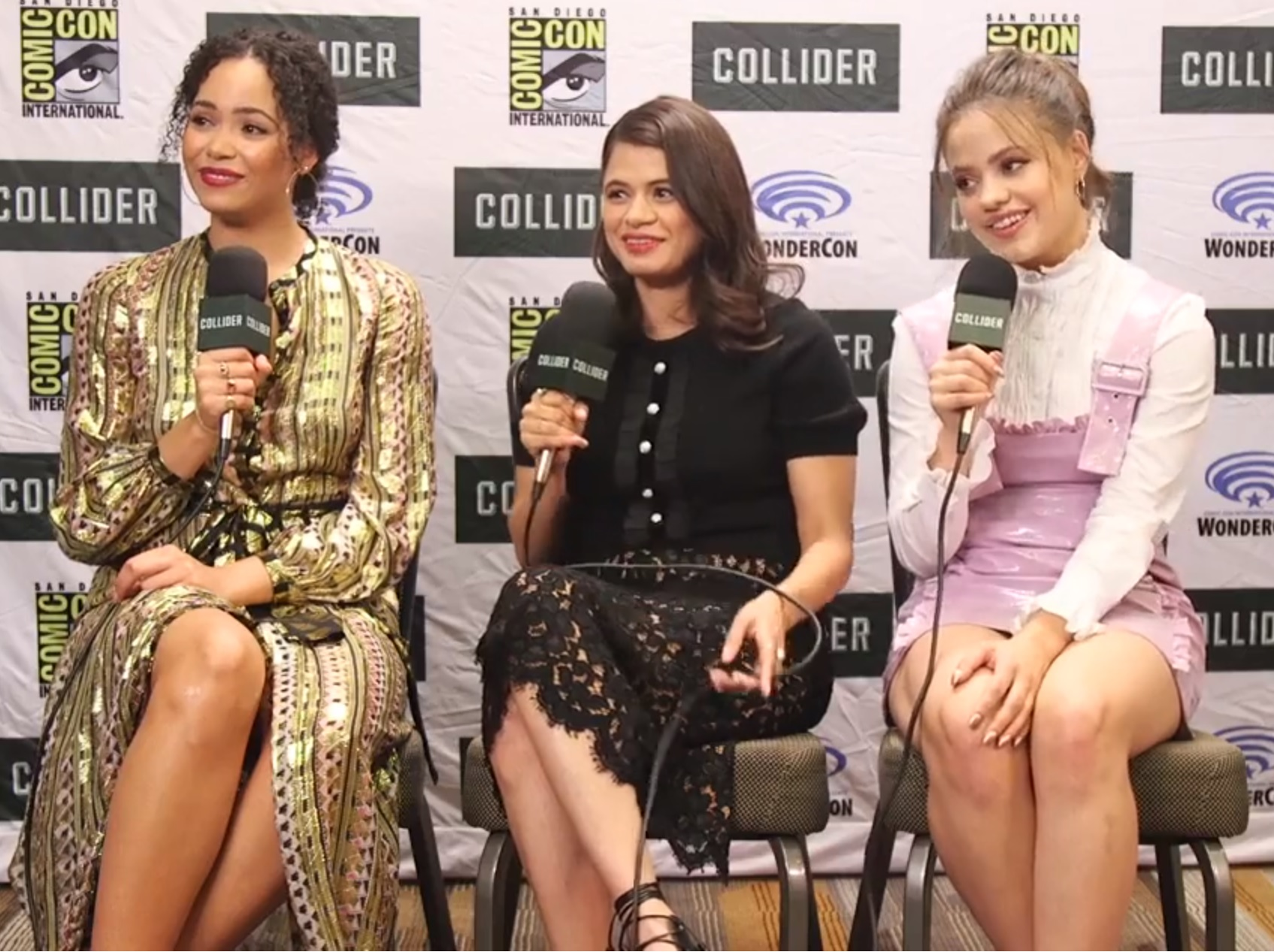
Diaz with Charmed co-stars at the 2018 Comic-Con

In 2014 she appeared briefly on an episode of Girls as Susan, a friend of Jessa Johansson's. That same year she appeared in Ryan Piers Williams' film X/Y alongside America Ferrera as well as The Cobbler starring Adam Sandler.

In February 2018, Diaz was cast in the lead role of Mel Vera in The CW's fantasy drama series Charmed, a reboot of the 1998 series of the same name. The reboot "centers on three sisters in a college town who discover they are witches".

Diaz co-starred in the dystopian thriller The First Purge, the prequel to 2013's The Purge and the fourth installment in The Purge franchise. The film was released July 4, 2018.

== Personal life ==
Diaz is married to singer Octavio Genera, having eloped during the COVID-19 pandemic. She announced her pregnancy with their first child in March 2021. Their daughter was born on July 20, 2021.

== Filmography ==
=== Film ===
Year	Film	Role	Notes
2001	Double Whammy	Maribel Benitez	
2002	From an Objective Point of View	Kelly	
2002	Raising Victor Vargas	Melonie	
2005	Lords of Dogtown	Blanca	
2006	A Guide to Recognizing Your Saints	Young Laurie	Nominated — Independent Spirit Award for Best Supporting Female
2006	Emil	Unnamed Actress	
2007	Itty Bitty Titty Committee	Anna	
2007	Remember the Daze	Brianne	
2007	Feel the Noise	Mimi	
2008	American Son	Cristina	
2008	I'll Come Running	Veronica	
2008	Assassination of a High School President	Clara	
2008	Be Kind Rewind	Alma	
2008	Hamlet 2	Ivonne	
2008	Nothing like the Holidays	Marissa	
2012	She Wants Me	Gwen	
2012	Supporting Characters	Liana	
2012	Save the Date	Isabelle	
2013	Fruitvale Station	Sophina	Nominated — Independent Spirit Award for Best Supporting Female; Nominated — Black Reel Award for Outstanding Supporting Actress; Nominated — Black Reel Award for Outstanding Breakthrough Performance, Female
2014	X/Y	Jen	
2014	The Cobbler	Carmen	
2016	Ghost Team	Ellie	
2016	The Belko Experiment	Dany Wilkins	
2017	And Then I Go	Ms. Meier	
2018	Gringo	Mia	
2018	All About Nina	Gloria	
2018	The First Purge	Juani	
2025	Roofman	Talana	
TBA	Monsanto	TBA	Filming

=== Television ===
Year	Series	Role	Notes
2003	Queens Supreme	Mr. Diaz's Daughter	Episode: "Pilot"
2003	Law & Order	Bettina	Episode: "Ill-Conceived"
2010	Nip/Tuck	Ramona Perez	3 episodes
2010	CSI: Miami	Ivonne Hernandez	Episode: "Manhunt"
2010	Rizzoli & Isles	Mia	Episode: "When the Gun Goes Bang, Bang, Bang"
2011	Person of Interest	Paula Vasquez	Episode: "Number Crunch"
2012	Ro	Ro	6 episodes
2014	Girls	Susan	Episode: "Dead Inside"
2016	The Breaks	Damita	Main role
2017	Room 104	Meg	Episode: "Ralphie"; Nominated — Imagen Foundation Award for Best Supporting Actress - Television
2017	Elementary	Tanya	Episode: "Hurt Me, Hurt You"
2018–2022	Charmed	Mel Vera	Main role Nominated — Teen Choice Award for Choice TV Actress Fantasy/Sci-Fi
2024	American Horror Stories	Mary Gentile	Episode: "The Thing Under the Bed"
