= All About Nina =

2018 comedy-drama film

- Theatrical release poster
- Directed by: Eva Vives
- Written by: Eva Vives
- Produced by: Eric B. Fleischman; Natalie Qasabian; Sean Tabibian; Eva Vives
- Starring: Mary Elizabeth Winstead; Common; Chace Crawford; Jay Mohr; Kate del Castillo; Beau Bridges
- Cinematography: Thomas Scott Stanton
- Edited by: Saira Haider; Susan Littenberg
- Music by: John Dragonetti
- Production companies: Diablo Entertainment; Malibu Films; Candela Films
- Distributed by: The Orchard
- Release dates: April 22, 2018 (Tribeca); September 28, 2018 (United States)
- Running time: 97 minutes
- Country: United States
- Language: English
- Box office: $100,335

All About Nina is a 2018 comedy-drama film, written and directed by Eva Vives, in her feature directorial debut. It stars Mary Elizabeth Winstead, Common, Chace Crawford, Jay Mohr, Kate del Castillo and Beau Bridges.

The film premiered at the Tribeca Film Festival on April 22, 2018. Shortly thereafter, The Orchard acquired U.S. distribution rights. It was released on September 28, 2018 and received positive reviews from critics, who praised Winstead's performance.

== Plot ==
Nina Geld is a successful New York comedian, but in her private life she is a disaster. Apart from a good relationship with her mother, she has only had occasional relationships with men except for a relationship that drags on with Joe, a violent and married policeman, whom she cannot get rid of. When her agent offers her to join the cast of a successful television show recorded in Los Angeles, Nina jumps at the chance to change her scene and, aware of the great risk she is taking, decides to move to the West Coast in search of the success that will change her life. Lake puts her up in Los Angeles, a friend of her agent who has made a fortune and who lives in a splendid villa on the hill and who is very kind and attentive to her. After her first Californian performance, Nina meets Rafe, an older man who, beyond physical attraction, expresses an even greater interest in her, leading her to imagine the prospect of a relationship. This is something new for Nina and, despite her distrust, she must admit that things seem to work with this man and that a relationship can be considered.

Called to perform to be selected with other women for the TV show, she gives a great performance and is taken, thus achieving her goal. Buoyed by this success, when she returns to a club, she finds Joe waiting for her, who came especially for her from New York. He meets Rafe who abruptly throws him out but then leaves offended since Nina had confided in him that she had never had a relationship before him. Nina feels guilty and when she goes on stage, upset, instead of doing a comic monologue, she tells her sad story, that of a child raped by her father, who took advantage of her for eight years. The confession is very touching but it also ends up changing her relationship with the series that hired her.

Nina finds Rafe's love again and, having missed the opportunity on television, after exposing herself publicly, she is in great demand in clubs, where she can continue to express herself freely and succeed in her comedy.

== Cast ==
- Mary Elizabeth Winstead as Nina Geld
- Common as Rafe Hines
- Beau Bridges as Larry Michaels
- Kate del Castillo as Lake
- Chace Crawford as Joe
- Clea DuVall as Paula
- Jay Mohr as Mike
- Andrew Kai as Cy
- Melonie Diaz as Gloria
- Camryn Manheim as Debra
- Mindy Sterling as Amy
- Angelique Cabral as Carrie
- Nicole Byer as Leslie
- Cate Freedman as Maria
- Ramona Young as Mika
- Victor Rasuk as Rae
- Sonoya Mizuno as Ganja
- Charlotte Newhouse as Carmela
- Alex Lewis as Kyle

== Production ==
In October 2017, it was announced that Mary Elizabeth Winstead and Common, Beau Bridges, Kate del Castillo, Chace Crawford, Clea DuVall, Jay Mohr, Melonie Diaz, Camryn Manheim, Mindy Sterling and Angelique Cabral had joined the cast of the film, with Eva Vives writing and directing from her screenplay.

== Critical response ==
On Rotten Tomatoes the film has an approval rating of 85%, based on 62 reviews, with an average rating of 6.9/10. The critical consensus reads, "Led by an outstanding central performance from Mary Elizabeth Winstead and brilliantly held together by writer-director Eva Vives, All About Nina is a delightfully raw dramedy." On Metacritic, the film has a score of 70 out of 100, based on 17 reviews, indicating "generally favorable" reviews.
