= Jacob Kogan =

American actor (born 1995)

- Born: Jacob Pavlovich Kogan; May 28, 1995 (age 31); New York City, New York, U.S.
- Occupation: Actor
- Years active: 2006–2014
- Parent(s): Deborah Copaken; Paul Kogan

Jacob Pavlovich Kogan (born May 28, 1995) is an American actor. He is perhaps best known for playing the title role in the 2007 psychological thriller Joshua and as the young Spock in J. J. Abrams' Star Trek.

== Life and career ==
Kogan was born in New York City to author and photographer Deborah Copaken Kogan and Russian-born child actor Paul Kogan. Paul emigrated from Moscow, Russia (then in the Soviet Union). Kogan has two younger siblings; a sister, Sasha (born March 1997) and a brother, Leo (born May 2006). His mother's family were Jewish immigrants from Russia, Ukraine and Lithuania, and his father is a Russian-Jewish immigrant. He considers himself Jewish and an atheist.

He attended the Dalton School in New York City during which time he was the lead singer/guitarist in a band, Flake, which released a self-titled EP in 2008. Before starring in Joshua, Kogan was a regular on the comedy series, Wonder Showzen. He had a supporting role in Lifelines by writer/director Rob Margolies. The film was released on April 3, 2009 at the Quad Theater in Manhattan after being shown at film festivals in the previous year. He also had a supporting role in the television series Delocated as David. He guest-starred on Law & Order: Special Victims Unit in 2011 in the episode "Blood Brothers" as Tripp Raines. He also portrayed Luca Jameson in the science fiction series The Tomorrow People.

Kogan studied at Northwestern University.

== Filmography ==
=== Film ===
Year	Film	Role	Notes
2007	Joshua	Joshua Cairn	Fright Meter Award for Best Supporting Actor; Nominated–29th Young Artist Awards
2008	Wherever You Are	Spencer Bernstein	
2009	Star Trek	Young Spock	

=== Television ===
Year	Film	Role	Notes
2006	Wonder Showzen	Various	
2009– 13	Delocated	David	Main role; 25 episodes
2011	Law & Order: Special Victims Unit	Tripp Raines	Episode: "Blood Brothers"
2013– 14	The Tomorrow People	Luca Jameson	Recurring role; 12 episodes
