= Bonneville (film) =

2006 American film by Christopher N. Rowley

- Original poster
- Directed by: Christopher N. Rowley
- Screenplay by: Daniel D. Davis
- Story by: Daniel D. Davis; Christopher N. Rowley
- Produced by: Robert May; John Kilker
- Starring: Jessica Lange; Kathy Bates; Joan Allen; Christine Baranski; Victor Rasuk; Tom Skerritt
- Cinematography: Jeffrey L. Kimball
- Edited by: Lisa Fruchtman; Anita Brandt Burgoyne
- Music by: Jeff Cardoni
- Production companies: SenArt Films; Drop of Water Productions
- Distributed by: SenArt Films
- Release dates: September 11, 2006 (TIFF); February 29, 2008 (United States)
- Running time: 93 minutes
- Country: United States
- Language: English
- Box office: $1,338,570

Bonneville is a 2006 American comedy-drama film directed by Christopher N. Rowley and starring Jessica Lange, Kathy Bates, Joan Allen, Tom Skerritt, and Christine Baranski. The screenplay by Daniel D. Davis is based on a story by Davis and Rowley.

== Plot ==
When Arvilla Holden's considerably older husband Joe dies while the two are vacationing in Borneo, she has his remains cremated and returns with them to their home in Pocatello, Idaho with plans to scatter them as he wished. Joe's resentful daughter from his first marriage, Francine, demands Arvilla relinquish the ashes so they can be buried in the family crypt in Montecito, California and threatens to sell Arvilla's home, which was left to Francine in her father's original will, unless she cooperates. Arvilla grudgingly agrees and invites her best friends, single and lonely Margene, a former teacher who lost her job because she advocated birth control to her students, and married Carol, a devout Mormon, to accompany her to the memorial service.

The three women drive to Salt Lake City International Airport in Holden's refurbished 1966 Pontiac Bonneville convertible, but Arvilla decides to detour to the Bonneville Salt Flats, a place she and Joe had visited on their honeymoon. As they race across the flats, the top of the urn containing the ashes falls off and some of them are scattered in the wind. Arvilla decides to honor Joe's last request and scatter his ashes at other places they visited throughout their twenty-year-long marriage. This change of plans results in a road trip that takes the women to Bryce Canyon National Park, Skull Valley, Lake Powell, Las Vegas, and the desert near Palm Springs. During their journey they encounter Bo Douglas, a young man searching for the father he never knew, and Emmett, an aging long-distance truck driver who has devoted his life to the road ever since his wife died, in addition to exploring their friendship and themselves as they come of age for the second time.

== Cast ==
- Jessica Lange as Arvilla Holden
- Kathy Bates as Margene
- Joan Allen as Carol
- Tom Skerritt as Emmett
- Victor Rasuk as Bo Douglas
- Christine Baranski as Francine
- Tom Amandes as Bill
- Tom Wopat as Arlo

== Production ==
The film was shot on location throughout the Western United States.

The film premiered at the 2006 Toronto International Film Festival and was shown at the Deauville American Film Festival in France, the Film by the Sea Film Festival in the Netherlands, and the Malmesbury Film Society in the United Kingdom in 2007 before being given a limited theatrical release in the US on February 29, 2008. The film eventually grossed $488,393 in the US and $850,177 in other territories for a total worldwide box office of $1,338,570.

== Critical reception ==
The film was a box office and critical failure. On Rotten Tomatoes the film has an approval rating of 40% based on reviews from 40 critics.

David Rooney of Variety called the film "a bland road movie running on empty" and added, "It's depressing to see a deluxe cast wasted on such by-the-numbers material—from predictable plot to fabricated Hallmark sentiment to strenuous milking of warm-and-fuzzy laughs from the irrepressible spirit of three women whose youth is behind them ... there's a big difference between a filmmaker who can actually convey with real feeling the pain of loss or the courage required to carry on, and one who merely connects the dots to illustrate it."

Matt Zoller Seitz of The New York Times said, "The 50-something leads and meandering pace distinguish Bonneville from other movies of its type" and added, "[T]he film has many tiresome elements ... Except for Ms. Lange's silent, expressive close-ups ... the women's journey is aesthetically and dramatically unremarkable."
