= In Fidelity =

- Official poster
- Directed by: Rob Margolies
- Written by: Rob Margolies
- Produced by: Rob Margolies; Joe Grano; David Thomas Newman
- Starring: Chris Parnell; Cara Buono; Willow Shields; Illeana Douglas; Dennis Haysbert
- Release date: November 4, 2024 (Los Angeles)
- Country: United States
- Language: English

In Fidelity is a 2024 American drama film written and directed by Rob Margolies and starring Chris Parnell, Cara Buono, Willow Shields, Illeana Douglas, and Dennis Haysbert.

== Plot ==
A happily married couple tests the boundaries of their previously monogamous relationship.

== Cast ==
- Chris Parnell as Lyle Ayker
- Cara Buono as Holly Ayker
- Dennis Haysbert as Hoyt Johnston
- Willow Shields as Greta Ayker
- Illeana Douglas as Ethel
- Eve Austin as Kiki
- Tim Reabulto as Louie

== Production ==
Filming occurred in New York City in October 2022.

== Release ==
The film premiered in Los Angeles on November 4, 2024 and on VOD on November 5, 2024.
