= Dreama Walker =

American actress

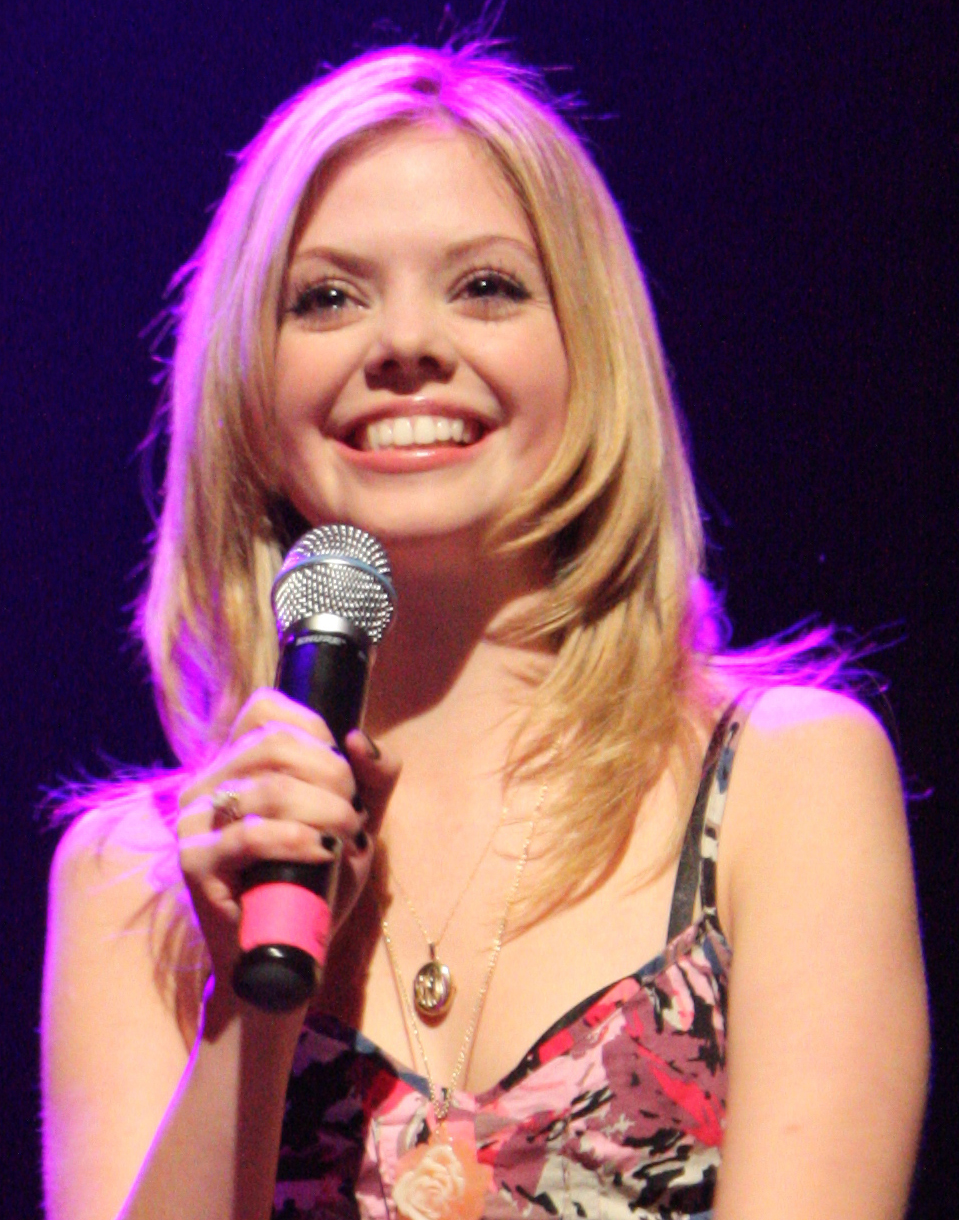
- Walker in February 2010
- Born: Dreama Elyse Walker; June 20, 1986 (age 40); Tampa, Florida, U.S.
- Occupation: Actress
- Years active: 2006–present
- Spouse: Christopher McMahon (m. 2015)
- Children: 2

Dreama Elyse Walker (born June 20, 1986) is an American actress. She is known for her supporting role in the series Gossip Girl, her lead role in the film Compliance (2012), and her lead roles in two short-lived television series, the comedy Don't Trust the B— in Apartment 23 and the legal drama Doubt.

== Career ==
=== Film ===
In 2008, Walker appeared in the film Wherever You Are. That same year, she played Ashley Kowalski, the granddaughter of Clint Eastwood's character, in Gran Torino. She later starred in the 2012 film Compliance.

Walker played Connie Stevens in Quentin Tarantino's Once Upon a Time in Hollywood (2019).

=== Television ===
From 2008 to 2009, Walker appeared in the first two seasons of Gossip Girl as Hazel Williams, one of Blair Waldorf's minions. In 2010, Walker starred as Harper Grace in the two-part miniseries Seven Deadly Sins.

From 2012 to 2013, she starred as June on the sitcom Don't Trust the B— in Apartment 23. Walker guest-starred in a 2013 episode of the sitcom New Girl as Molly, a nemesis for Jess, the eponymous New Girl. She played the role of Becca in eight episodes of the first five seasons of the drama series The Good Wife.

On May 5, 2014, it was announced that Walker would co-star in the Amazon Studios comedy-drama series Cocked. The pilot debuted on January 15, 2015, but never made it to series.

== Personal life ==
Walker resides in Los Angeles, California. On August 1, 2015, Walker married Christopher McMahon in Kauai. They have two daughters together.

== Filmography ==
=== Film ===
Year	Title	Role	Notes
2007	Goodbye Baby	Kelsy	
2008	Sex and the City	Upper East Side waitress	
2008	Wherever You Are	Meghan Bernstein	
2008	Gran Torino	Ashley Kowalski	
2009	The Invention of Lying	Receptionist	
2011	The Pill	Rose	
2012	Compliance	Becky	Nominated—Chainsaw Award for Best Supporting Actress
2012	Father/Son	Elizabeth	Short film
2012	The Kitchen	Penny	
2012	The Discoverers	Abigail Marshall	
2012	Vamperifica	Tracey	
2013	Chlorine	Suzi	
2015	Don't Worry Baby	Sara-Beth	
2015	Paperback	Emily	
2019	Once Upon a Time in Hollywood	Connie Stevens	
2021	Pooling to Paradise	Kara	

=== Television ===
Year	Title	Role	Notes
2006	Law & Order	Nicole Carlotti	Episode: "Release"
2007	Guiding Light	Janie Walker	2 episodes
2008–2009	Gossip Girl	Hazel Williams	14 episodes
2008	One Life to Live	Karen	Episode: "Gift Horse"
2008	Law & Order: Criminal Intent	Brenda Lally	Episode: "Neighborhood Watch"
2009	Ugly Betty	Chloe	Episode: "Curveball"
2009	Royal Pains	Melody Everett	Episode: "Strategic Planning"
2009–2013	The Good Wife	Becca	8 episodes
2010	Mercy	Robin Noland	Episode: "There Is No Superwoman"
2010	Seven Deadly Sins	Harper Grace	Miniseries; 2 episodes
2012–2013	Don't Trust the B— in Apartment 23	June Colburn	Main role; 26 episodes Nominated—Teen Choice Award for Breakout Star: Female
2013	Robot Chicken	Jules Louden (voice)	Episode: "Immortal"
2013	New Girl	Molly	Episode: "Nerd"
2014	The Grim Sleeper	Christine Pelisek	Television film
2015	Law & Order: Special Victims Unit	Detective Reese Taymor	Episode: "Forgiving Rollins"
2015	Cocked	Tabby	Amazon Studios pilot
2015	A to Z	Madeline	Episode: "M Is for Meant to Be"
2017	Doubt	Tiffany Allan	Main role; 13 episodes
2017–2018	American Dad!	Mel, Student (voices)	2 episodes
2017	Adam Ruins Everything	Julia	Episode: "Adam Ruins Spa Day"
2018	Man with a Plan	Heather	Episode: "March Madness"
2018	Brockmire	Whitney	Season 2, recurring 4 episodes
2019	American Horror Story: 1984	Rita	Episode: "Slashdance"
