= Be Kind Rewind =

2008 film by Michel Gondry

- Theatrical release poster
- Directed by: Michel Gondry
- Written by: Michel Gondry
- Produced by: Michel Gondry; Julie Fong; Georges Bermann
- Starring: Jack Black; Mos Def; Danny Glover; Mia Farrow; Melonie Diaz
- Cinematography: Ellen Kuras
- Edited by: Jeff Buchanan
- Music by: Jean-Michel Bernard; Melissa Manchester
- Production company: Partizan Films
- Distributed by: New Line Cinema (United States); Focus Features International (International); Pathé Distribution (United Kingdom); EuropaCorp Distribution (France)
- Release dates: January 20, 2008 (Sundance); February 15, 2008 (United Kingdom); February 22, 2008 (United States); March 5, 2008 (France)
- Running time: 98 minutes
- Countries: United Kingdom; France; United States
- Language: English
- Budget: $20 million
- Box office: $30.6 million

Be Kind Rewind is a 2008 buddy comedy film written and directed by Michel Gondry and starring Jack Black, Mos Def, Danny Glover, Mia Farrow, and Melonie Diaz with supporting roles done by Chandler Parker, Irv Gooch, Arjay Smith, Marcus Carl Franklin, Blake Hightower, and Amir Ali Said. It tells the story of an employee at the titular VHS rental store and his conspiracy theorist friend, who work to recreate the rental store's film inventory after they were accidentally erased when the latter got himself magnetized while the proprietor was away. The film first appeared on January 20, 2008, at the 2008 Sundance Film Festival. It was later shown at the Berlin International Film Festival. The film opened on February 22, 2008, in the United Kingdom and in North America.

The title is inspired by a phrase that was commonly displayed on video rental cassettes in America during the medium's heyday.

The film was met with mixed reviews.

== Plot ==
In Passaic, New Jersey, Elroy Fletcher owns the declining "Be Kind Rewind" VHS rental store. The building is condemned as a slum and the officials led by Mr. Baker give him 60 days to upgrade it to the required standards, or they will demolish it to make way for high-end development.

Fletcher leaves on a trip with friends to memorialize jazz musician Fats Waller and visit rental store chains to research efficient and modernized ways of running one, leaving his only employee Mike to work alone. Before leaving, Fletcher cautions Mike to keep his conspiracy theorist friend Jerry away from the store. However, Mike misinterprets his warnings on the train window and is left confused.

After attempting to sabotage an electrical substation, believing its energy to be melting his brain, Jerry receives a shock which leaves him magnetized. When entering the store the next day, he inadvertently erases all its VHS tapes. Mike discovers the disaster and is further pressed when Fletcher's acquaintance Miss Falewicz wants to rent Ghostbusters. To prevent her from reporting a problem to Fletcher, Mike comes up with an idea: as Miss Falewicz has never seen the movie, he proposes to recreate the film with cheap special effects, using himself and Jerry as the actors and hoping to fool her. They complete the movie just in time when a customer named Jack arrives asking for Rush Hour 2. Mike and Jerry repeat their filming, enlisting the help of a local girl named Alma for some of the parts. She later makes Jerry a remedy that demagnetizes him at the cost of his vomiting and emitting magnetic urine.

Word of mouth spreads through Miss Falewicz's nephew Craig and his gang of the inadvertently hilarious results of Mike and Jerry's filming of Ghostbusters, and soon the store is seeing more requests for such movies. Mike, Jerry, and Alma pretend the films came from Sweden to justify long wait times and higher costs for the rental ($20 instead of $1). To meet demand, they enlist the locals to help out in making the movies, using them as actors in their films. When Fletcher returns intent on converting the store to a DVD rental outlet, he recognizes that they are making more money from the "sweded" films than from normal rentals after learning about what happened and joins in with the process.

However, the success is put to a halt when government attorney Ms. Lawson arrives with two federal agents. Ms. Lawson insists the "sweded" films are copyright violations. They seize the store's tapes which they destroy with help from a steamroller operator much to the dismay of the locals and seize the assets to pay off the respective studios. As a result, Fletcher gives up hope and reveals to Mike that he made up the connection of Fats Waller to the building. Fletcher is given a week to evacuate it before its demolition.

With the help of the locals, Jerry and Alma convince Fletcher and Mike to give one last hurrah and put together a documentary dedicated to the alternate history of Fats Waller. They create Fats Waller Was Born Here.

On the day the building is scheduled for demolition, Fletcher invites all the locals to watch the final film and quietly reveals to Miss Falewicz that he gave Mr. Baker permission to go ahead with the demolition plans after the film ends. When Jerry accidentally breaks the store's TV screen trying to raise it for all to see, a nearby DVD store owner loans them his video projector, allowing them to show the movie on a cloth placed in the store's window. Fletcher, Mike, and Jerry depart the store to find a bigger crowd, including the wrecking crew, who have gathered in the street to watch the film through the window and are cheered on.

== Cast ==
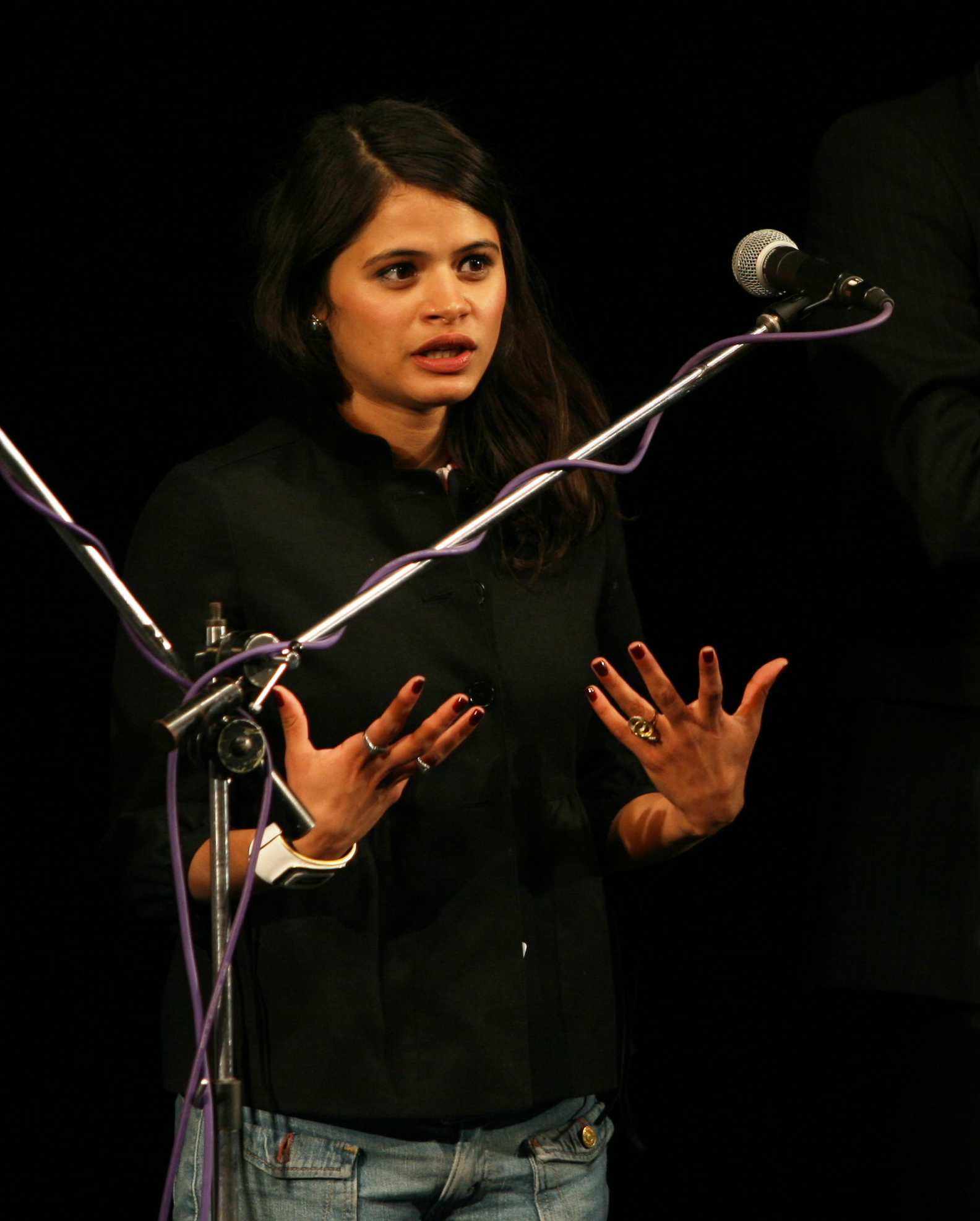
Melonie Diaz introducing the film at the Karlovy Vary International Film Festival in 2008

- Jack Black as Jerry McLean, a conspiracy theorist and friend of Mike who lives in a trailer in the junkyard that he works in.
- Mos Def as Mike Coolwell, a worker at "Be Kind Rewind".
- Danny Glover as Elroy Fletcher, the proprietor of "Be Kind Rewind".
- Mia Farrow as Miss Falewicz, a friend of Elroy.
- Melonie Diaz as Alma Sykes, an intelligent laundromat worker who assists Mike and Jerry with their "sweded" videos.
- Irv Gooch as Wilson, a mechanic who is friends with Jerry.
- Chandler Parker as Craig, the nephew of Miss Falewicz.
- Arjay Smith as Manny, one of Craig's friends.
- Quinton Aaron as Q, a towering man who is one of Craig's friends.
- Gio Perez as Randy
- Basia Rosas as Andrea
- Tomasz Soltys as Carl
- Marcus Carl Franklin as Kid #1
- Blake Hightower as Kid #2
- Amir Ali Said as Kid #3
- David Slotkoff as Jack, a local resident who wanted to rent Rush Hour 2.
- Frank Heins as Patrick
- Heather Lawless as Sherry
- Karolina Wydra as Gabrielle Bochenski
- Allie Woods Jr. as Dr. Bent, a local doctor who examines Jerry after he was magnetized.
- McKinley Page as Brother McDuff, a local priest.
- Kishu Chand as Alma's sister who runs the local laundromat
- Ann Longo as Miss Falewicz's friend
- Parrie Hodges as Miss Falewicz's friend who was later cast as Fats' birth mother in the Fats Waller movie
- August Darnell as a Passaic West Coast Video Employee
- Jon Glaser as an NYC West Coast Video Store Employee
- P. J. Byrne as Mr. Baker, a city official
- Marceline Hugot as a city hall employee
- John Tormey as a demolition chief who was enlisted to level "Be Kind Rewind"
- Frank Girardeau as Officer Gary, a police officer who patrols the neighborhood that "Be Kind Rewind" is in.
- Matt Walsh as Officer Julian, a police officer and Officer Gary's partner who patrol's the neighborhood that "Be Kind Rewind" is in.
- Paul Dinello as Mr. Rooney, a Federal agent who posed as a "Be Kind Rewind" customer who came all the way from New York City to see the "sweded" videos.
- Sigourney Weaver as Ms. Lawson, a government attorney who was dispatched to deal with the "sweded" videos.

Booker T. Jones, Steve Cropper, Donald "Duck" Dunn, Jimmy Scott and McCoy Tyner appear as Fats Waller fans in a scene cut from the theatrical release, but restored for the DVD.

== "Sweded" ==
Films that were erased and recreated are referred to as having been sweded. These remakes are unedited with only a single take per scene. The tapes are described as having come from Sweden as an excuse for higher rental fees and longer wait times. Jerry fabricates the word "sweded" while arguing with Craig (Chandler Parker) and his gang.

In light of the theme of sweding, director Michel Gondry sweded a version of the trailer of the film, starring himself. On the official website, users could engage in sweding, which puts their faces on the VHS cover of a movie. The Be Kind Rewind YouTube channel also encourages filmmakers to create sweded versions of popular movies. A Sweded Film Festival launched in 2016 to showcase fanmade sweded films.

The theme of sweding also relates to film history, in that the collectively made remakes represent social memories of films, and memories that arise through films.

A disclaimer during the credits stated that Mike and Jerry's Sweded films can be seen at the now defunct www.bekindrewind-themovie.com.

== Reception ==
=== Box office ===
In its opening weekend, the film earned $4 million in 808 theaters in the United States and Canada, ranking No. 9 at the box office, and averaging $5,013 per theater. As of September 21, 2008, the film had grossed $30.4 million worldwide—an estimated $11 million in the United States and Canada and $19 million in other territories.

=== Reception ===
On the review aggregator website Rotten Tomatoes, 64% of 125 critics' reviews are positive. The website's consensus reads: "Slighter and less disciplined than Gondry's previous mind-benders." Metacritic, which uses a weighted average, assigned the film a score of 52 out of 100, based on 35 critics, indicating "mixed or average" reviews.

Writing in The New York Times, reviewer A. O. Scott called the film "inviting, undemanding and altogether wonderful" and added that "you'll want to see it again, or at least Swede it yourself."
