= Paola Mendoza =

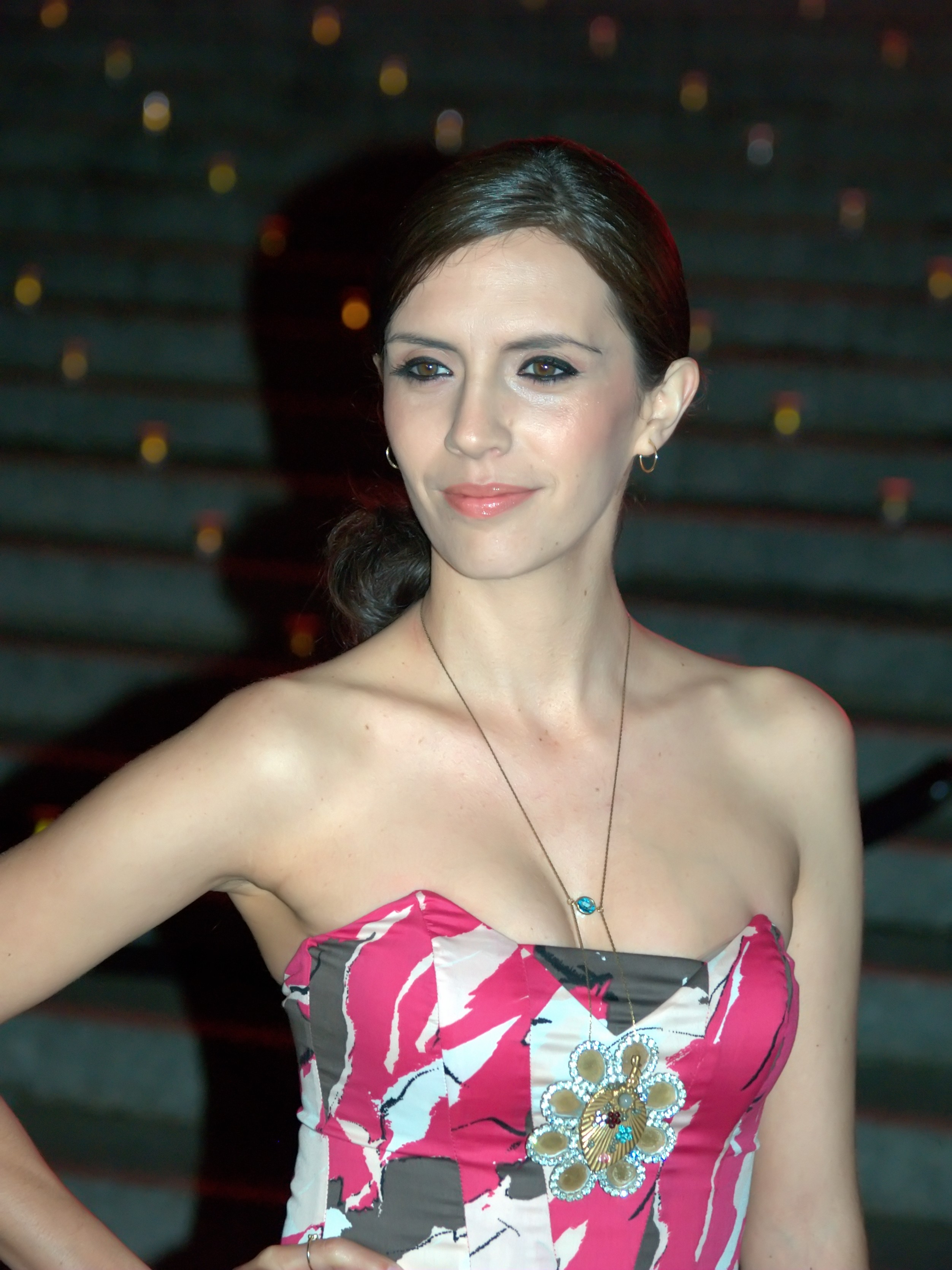
- Paola Mendoza at the 2009 Tribeca Film Festival
- Born: 1981 (age 44–45); Bogotá, Colombia
- Education: UCLA (BA); Sarah Lawrence College (MFA)
- Occupations: Activist; filmmaker; actress; writer
- Years active: 2003–present
- Spouse: Michael Skolnik
- Children: 1

Paola Mendoza is a film director, activist, author, and artist. In 2017, she co-founded and served as the artistic director for the 2017 Women's March.

== Early life ==
Mendoza was born and raised in Bogotá, Colombia. She came to the United States as an infant with her mother and brother. Their family struggled and were homeless for a short period until her mother obtained a job at a fast food restaurant. At the age of twelve, Mendoza was involved with a gang. Her mother sent her back to Colombia for a few years to live with an aunt to take her out of the gang situation. Mendoza returned to Los Angeles for her senior year of high school. After attending community college for three years, she graduated from UCLA and earned her master's degree at Sarah Lawrence College.

== Career ==
=== Film ===
In 2004, Mendoza starred in the film On the Outs, which won the Jury Award at the Deauville Film Festival. Mendoza's first documentary feature, Autumn’s Eyes, premiered at the 2006 South by Southwest Festival. The documentary centered on a three-year-old girl living with her adolescent mother on the margins of society and facing the possibility of foster care. That same year, Mendoza's documentary short film Still Standing premiered at the Full Frame Film Festival. Still Standing follows Mendoza's grandmother's struggle to rebuild her life after losing her home in Mississippi during Hurricane Katrina.

Mendoza later wrote and directed the film, Entre nos, which was in part based on her mother's life. The film was shown at multiple film festivals including the Tribeca Film Festival.

=== Activism and art ===
Mendoza was a co-founder of the 2017 Women's March and also served as its artistic director.

In 2018, Mendoza served as the creative director for the exhibition "I Am a Child" at the National Civil Rights Museum in Memphis. The exhibition is a collection of photographs highlighting the separation of undocumented immigrant children from their parents at the U.S. border.

Mendoza co-founded the Resistance Revival Chorus with Sarah Sophia Flicker and Ginny Suss. The Resistance Revival Chorus sang backup for Kesha during her performance of "Praying" at the 2018 Grammy Awards.

In 2022, she co-founded The Meteor, “a platform to amplify the creative work of BIPOC women, LGBTQ+ people.” The Meteor serves as a collective of journalists, artists, filmmakers, and media leaders who produce films and audio content.

=== Author ===
With Sarah Sophie Flicker, Mendoza co-authored Together We Rise: Behind the Scenes at the Protest Heard Around the World, which chronicles the inaugural Women's March. Mendoza also co-wrote the young adult novel Sanctuary, with Abby Sher, which made the Young Adult Library Services Association’s Best Fiction for 2020 List.

== Personal life ==
Mendoza has a son with partner, Michael Skolnik.

== Filmography ==
Year	Title	Role	Notes
2003	Gabriel y Gato	Lost woman	Short film
2004	On the Outs	Marisol Pagan	
2006	Autumn’s Eyes		Co-directed
2007	Padre neustro	Magda	
2007	Goodbye Baby	Anita	
2007	One Night	Michelle	
2008	Last Call	Paola	
2009	Entre nos	Mariana	Also director, writer
2010	La toma		Short film, director
2011	The Undying	Betty Donovan	
2012	Half of Her		Short film, director
2014	Broken Tail Light		Short film, director
