= On the Outs =

- Theatrical release poster
- Directed by: Lori Silverbush; Michael Skolnik
- Written by: Lori Silverbush
- Produced by: Lori Silverbush; Michael Skolnik
- Starring: Judy Marte; Anny Mariano; Paola Mendoza; Dominic Colón
- Cinematography: Mariana Sánchez de Antuñano
- Edited by: Martha Skolnik
- Music by: Ricardo Leigh; Brian Satz
- Production companies: Fader Films; Youth House Productions
- Distributed by: Kindred Media Group
- Release dates: September 11, 2004 (TIFF); July 13, 2005 (United States)
- Running time: 86 minutes
- Country: United States
- Language: English

On the Outs is a 2004 drama film co-directed by Lori Silverbush and Michael Skolnik. The film chronicles the lives of three young women in a Jersey City neighborhood and their struggles against the law and drugs. One girl is a 17-year-old drug dealer, another is a teenage drug addict with a child, and one is a teenager dealing with pregnancy. The film is based on actual case studies of young women interviewed by the filmmakers at the Hudson County Juvenile Detention Center.

The film premiered at the 2004 Toronto International Film Festival and was later screened in limited release on July 13, 2005. It won the Jury Special Prize at the Deauville Film Festival and the Grand Jury Prize at the Slamdance Film Festival.

== Cast ==
- Judy Marte as Oz
- Anny Mariano as Suzette Williams
- Paola Mendoza as Marisol Pagan
- Dominic Colón as Chuy
- Flaco Navaja as Jimmy Ortiz
- Danny Rivera as J Stutter
- Gloria Zelaya as Rosa

== Production ==
The stories of the central characters are directly based on interviews that Silverbush and Skolnik conducted with young women at the Hudson County Juvenile Detention Center in Secaucus. Silverbush, Skolnik, and Paola Mendoza spent 4 months at the facility working with the young women and developing the characters. Originally, the film was going be to be about one girl, with Mendoza playing the part as she had personal experiences with gang activity in her youth. Silverbush said, "Once we started working with the girls in the jail, we realized there was no way we could limit ourselves to one character and do justice to the huge range of experiences that make up the lives of inner-city kids." The production decided to focus the film’s story on three characters: Oz, Suzette, and Marisol.

The film was shot in November 2003 in Jersey City. The crew welcomed members of the local community, including gang members and drug dealers, to help out or appear in the film.

== Release ==
The film premiered at the 2004 Toronto International Film Festival. It went on to screen at festivals like Slamdance, Berlinale, and GenArt, among others. The film was largely self-distributed, with Fader Films assisting with marketing. It received a limited theatrical release in New York City on July 13, 2005. On May 9, 2006, Polychrome Pictures released the film on DVD.

== Critical reception ==
On the Outs has a 93% approval rating based on 31 reviews on Rotten Tomatoes. The site’s critics consensus reads, "With powerful lead performances, this gritty docudrama about the desperate lives of three young women in Jersey City packs an emotional wallop."

Stephen Holden of The New York Times said On the Outs "is certainly not the first film to show how a crushing urban environment can make a sensible-sounding antidrug slogan like 'just say no' seem like so much nonsense, but it's one of the strongest." He added, "It isn't the tics of the plot but the raw human texture beneath that really matters." Writing for The Village Voice, Laura Sinagra commented "the environment feels real: the accents, the snaps, the working moms and warehouse crack nooks, every dilapidated stairwell, every bodega and lovingly appointed teenage bedroom sanctuary. Even frequent panning toward the Emerald City of Manhattan and the stark commentary of Lady Liberty throwing shade at Ocean Avenue blight don't seem excessive." The acting was universally praised, with Tasha Robinson of The A.V. Club calling the cast's performances "fearless" and "evocative", writing "When Marte howls in cornered anguish, or Mendoza weeps after a visitation with her baby, their honest, raw pain communicates more about the dead-end misery of poverty than a dozen neatly manufactured conclusions ever could."

Joe Leydon of Variety said the film is an "attention-grabbing showcase for three promising actresses in sharply drawn lead roles." Jan Stuart of the Los Angeles Times remarked "directors Lori Silverbush and Michael Skolnik manage to pack an amazing amount of emotion and environmental detail into the film’s 1 hour and 23 minutes...If the film teeters on sentimentality in brief patches (Oz’s relationship with her mentally challenged brother), it overrides that impulse with a vise-like grip on the way things really are." Nick Schager of Slant wrote, "Documentarians by trade, the directors use rough DV cinematography and no score to amplify their tale’s sense of lived-in reality, and though their staging can be stilted (such as a third-act scuffle that leads to unexpected tragedy), there’s a hardened emotional honesty that permeates even the most schematic moments. Much of this is due to On the Outs’ hands-off approach to moral judgment—its protagonists’ often-misguided, sometimes reprehensible actions are, for better or worse, simply allowed to speak for themselves."

== Honors ==
Deauville Film Festival

- Winner of the Jury Special Prize
- Nominated for the Grand Special Prize

Gotham Awards

- Nominated for the Breakthrough Director Award

Independent Spirit Awards

- Nominated for Best Female Lead - Judy Marte
- Nominated for the John Cassavetes Award - Lori Silverbush and Michael Skolnik

Slamdance Film Festival

- Winner of the Grand Jury Prize
