= Luke Sabis =

American film director

- Born: Luke Sabis
- Education: St. John’s University, LACC
- Occupations: Filmmaker, actor, director
- Years active: 2006–present
- Notable work: Missing Child, Ghost Tenant
- Website: www.lukesabis.com

Luke Sabis is a filmmaker, actor, and former musician known for acting in Cleaver's Destiny, and directing Missing Child and Ghost Tenant. He performed with the rock band, The Take, in the 1990s.

== Early life ==
Sabis was born in Brooklyn, New York and grew up in Queens, New York. He attended St. John's University where he earned a computer science degree; his first job was in this field. He wrote and played rock music with his band The Take at The Bitter End, CBGBs, and Kenny's Castaways.

== Career ==
Sabis appeared in some Off-Off-Broadway productions in New York, including being a member of Ken Terrell’s Curan Repertory Company.

Sabis enrolled in the film program at Los Angeles City College, where he directed and acted in his first film, Missing Child, as well as composing the score. The film was screened at the 2014 Boston International Film Festival, the Dances With Films festival in Hollywood California, and the Hawaii Big Island Film Festival.

In May 2015, Sabis' Ghost Tenant had its world premiere in the short film section at the Cannes Film Festival.

== Personal life ==
Sabis lives in Los Angeles.
