= Eva Vives =

Spanish screenwriter, director and producer

- Born: 9 January 1976 (age 50); Madrid, Spain
- Education: New York University
- Occupation: Filmmaker
- Years active: 2000–present
- Spouse: Peter Sollett
- Children: 1

Eva Vives (born 9 January 1976) is a Spanish screenwriter, director and producer. She directed All About Nina, her first feature, in 2017.

== Early life and education ==
Vives was born in Madrid and raised in Barcelona, where she lived until she was 18, at which point she moved to New York City in 1994 to attend New York University's Tisch School of the Arts.

== Career ==
Back in 2000, Eva Vives won the Best Short Prize at the Sundance Film Festival and Cannes Film Festival for the film she cast directed, edited, and produced Five Feet High and Rising.

Vives co-wrote the 2002 film Raising Victor Vargas, for which she was nominated for an Independent Spirit Award for Best First Screenplay and for a Humanitas Prize. Sometime around 2002, Vives then directed the short film Me, Myself & I. Soon after sometime around 2008 she directed, Co-wrote, and produced a short film She Pedals Fast (For a Girl).

She wrote and directed the short film Join the Club, starring Ari Graynor (which premiered at the 2016 Sundance Film Festival). She's the first woman writer and director to have attended the Sundance Film Festival with a film and participate in the Sundance Screenwriters' lab as well as the Directors' lab and Skywalker Sound and Music, all in the same year.

Vives has also been collaborating/ working on several other projects over the years including Chrome & Paint (which had been renamed to Laugh Now, Cry Later), a film she co-wrote with Ice Cube. This was being produced through Disney where Vives was then accepted into the Disney Writing Fellowship Program, where she was one of the four Disney writers in the Fellowship Program from 2010 to 2012.

She directed All About Nina, her first feature, in 2017—starring Mary Elizabeth Winstead and Common.

She has two other scripts, a feminist revenge film and an "All About Eve theater world story" that Vives describes as more "actor-y", as she states in one of her most recent interviews surrounding All About Nina.

In 2018, Vives received the Best LatinX Director Award from NALIP. In 2019 it was also announced that she is one of the recipients of the Sundance Momentum Fellowship.

=== Social Life ===
In New York at the beginning of Vives's career was where she was able to make connections through her relationship with a comedian—this opened a door for her to create a network with several other comedians at the time. She took advantage of this by incorporating her knowledge and experiences with these comedians into All About Nina.

In Vives's most recent years she finds her circle to reside in Los Angeles since her part in the writing of Victor Vargas—she still works and collaborates with the cast, which all base themselves in LA.

== Personal life ==
Eva Vives is married to Peter Sollett. The two have a son born in 2013, they currently live together in Los Angeles.

Some of the themes observed in All About Nina were inspired by the abuse that Vives suffered at the hands of her father, for eight years, when she was a child. About this fact Vives declared: "The liberation happened already; that's why I was able to write about it, because I didn't have to create that much. She's similar to how I was in my twenties". "It was more empowering to write in the sense that I don't really think about my father anymore. As Nina also says in the movie, he committed suicide years ago, so he was already not part of my life. For me, maybe it will be liberating soon enough…. We'll see what happens when it comes out. It was empowering to at least have some say on how I told the story, because for so long he defined me, what he did to me or what he was how I had to live."

Vives once dated a comedian, which she used as the basis of her characters in All About Nina.

== Filmography ==
=== Film ===
| Year | Title | Director | Writer | Producer | Notes |
|---|---|---|---|---|---|
| 2000 | Five Feet High and Rising | No | No | Yes | Short-film, Casting-director, Editor |
| 2002 | Raising Victor Vargas | No | Yes | No | Co-writer |
| 2007 | Me, Myself, & I | Yes | No | No | Short-film |
| 2008 | She Pedals Fast (For a Girl) | Yes | Yes | Yes | Short-film, Co-writer |
| 2017 | Join the Club | Yes | Yes | Yes | Short-film |
| 2018 | All About Nina | Yes | Yes | Yes | Feature film |

=== Television ===
| Year | Title | Note(s) |
|---|---|---|
| 2019 | The Affair | directed episode: "505" |
| 2020 | Party of Five | directed 2 episodes |
| 2021 | Good Girls | directed episode #45: "Put It all on Two" |
| 2022 | The Handmaid's Tale | directed 2 episodes |
| 2024 | Tell Me Lies | directed 2 episodes |

== Awards and nominations ==
| Year | Award | Category | Work | Result | Reference |
|---|---|---|---|---|---|
| 2003 & 2004 | Independent Spirit Award | Best First Screenplay | Raising Victor Vargas | Nominated | |
| 2003 & 2004 | Humanitas Prize | Sundance Feature Film | Raising Victor Vargas | Nominated | |
| 2018 | Tribeca Film Festival | Best Narrative Feature | All About Nina | Nominated | |
