= The Cobbler (2014 film) =

2014 film

- Theatrical release poster
- Directed by: Tom McCarthy
- Written by: Tom McCarthy; Paul Sado
- Produced by: Mary Jane Skalski; Tom McCarthy
- Starring: Adam Sandler; Cliff "Method Man" Smith; Ellen Barkin; Melonie Diaz; Dan Stevens; Fritz Weaver; Yul Vazquez; Steve Buscemi; Dustin Hoffman
- Cinematography: W. Mott Hupfel III
- Edited by: Tom McArdle
- Music by: John Debney; Nick Urata
- Production companies: Voltage Pictures; Golden Spike; Next Wednesday
- Distributed by: Image Entertainment
- Release dates: September 11, 2014 (TIFF); March 13, 2015 (U.S.)
- Running time: 98 minutes
- Country: United States
- Languages: English; Yiddish
- Budget: $10 million
- Box office: $6.5 million

The Cobbler is a 2014 American magic realism comedy-drama film directed by Tom McCarthy and cowritten by McCarthy with Paul Sado. The film stars Adam Sandler as a cobbler who finds himself able to assume the form of anyone by putting on their shoes. The supporting cast includes Cliff "Method Man" Smith, Ellen Barkin, Melonie Diaz, Dan Stevens, Fritz Weaver, Yul Vazquez, Steve Buscemi, and Dustin Hoffman.

The Cobbler premiered at the 2014 Toronto International Film Festival, where it was screened in the Special Presentations section. The film was released in U.S. theaters on March 13, 2015, by Image Entertainment. The Cobbler was panned by critics, and was a box-office bomb, grossing $6.5 million on a $10 million budget.

== Plot ==
In 1903, a group of Jewish men gather in a New York City cobbler's shop to discuss a thug who has been harassing their families and businesses. The cobbler, Pinchas Simkin, takes a pair of the thug's shoes to a special stitching machine and explains to his son the importance of the machine.

In the present day, Pinchas's great-grandson, Max Simkin, runs the cobbler shop. Jimmy operates the barber shop next door. Carmen Herrera, a young activist, fights against realtors who are demolishing parts of the neighborhood to build large developments. Max, disinterested in the shop, lives with his ailing mother, Sarah, and misses his father, Abraham.

Local thug Leon Ludlow brings his shoes to Max to be resoled. When Max’s stitching machine fails, he uses Pinchas’s original machine. Trying on Ludlow's shoes, Max magically transforms into Ludlow. Realizing the power of the machine, Max experiments by wearing different shoes to assume other identities.

Max uses the shoes to impersonate various people, including a Chinese man in Chinatown and Emiliano, his girlfriend Taryn’s British boyfriend. As Emiliano, he experiences unexpected attention but leaves when he must remove the shoes to shower. To make his mother happy, Max wears his late father's shoes during dinner, giving her a joyful night.

After Sarah dies, Max and his family observe shiva. As Max returns to work, Ludlow demands his shoes. Max, using various disguises, follows Ludlow to his apartment, witnessing him extort local businesses. Max gains entry when Ludlow’s girlfriend, Macy, leaves and discovers Ludlow’s hidden watch collection and a cache of weapons.

Before Max can leave, Ludlow returns and attacks him. Still disguised as Ludlow, Max fights back, subduing him with a taser and tying him up. Later, Max, still in disguise, accompanies Ludlow’s henchmen to a man being tortured. Using his assumed authority, Max commands the henchmen to stop, preventing the man’s murder.

Max returns to Ludlow’s apartment wearing stilettos but finds Ludlow has escaped his restraints. Ludlow ambushes Max, attempting to kill him. During their fight, Max stabs Ludlow with the stiletto, killing him. Max reports the death to the police, but no evidence is found.

Back at the shoe shop, Max finds the stilettos returned along with his bag of shoes and an envelope of cash. Jimmy confronts Max about his behavior and reveals that Max’s father also used the stitching machine before he disappeared.

Max and Carmen visit Mr. Solomon, a tenant threatened by slumlord Elaine Greenawalt. Max devises a plan to expose Greenawalt’s corruption, which leads to her arrest after her threats are recorded by the media.

As Max’s life returns to normal, Carmen invites him to dinner. Impersonating Ludlow, Max returns the watches to Macy and apologizes. Leaving, Max is abducted by a group led by the man he once saved. Their car is struck, and Max awakens in Jimmy’s barber shop. Jimmy reveals himself as Abraham, Max’s father, having faked his death. Father and son reunite, and Abraham shows Max the family’s collection of shoes. Abraham then drives Max through the city in their Cobblermobile, recounting the history of the stitching machine and their family legacy.

== Cast ==
- Adam Sandler as Max Simkin, a disillusioned cobbler who discovers a magical family secret
- Method Man as Leon Ludlow, a violent thug and loan enforcer
- Dustin Hoffman as Abraham Simkin, Max’s long-lost father
- Steve Buscemi as Jimmy, Max’s neighbor and local barber
- Melonie Diaz as Carmen Herrera, a community activist
- Ellen Barkin as Elaine Greenawalt, a ruthless real estate developer
- Dan Stevens as Emiliano, Taryn’s British boyfriend
- Dascha Polanco as Macy, Ludlow’s girlfriend
- Lynn Cohen as Sarah Simkin, Max’s ailing mother
- Fritz Weaver as Mr. Solomon, an elderly tenant targeted by Greenawalt
- Kim Cloutier as Taryn, Emiliano’s girlfriend
- Sondra James as Anna O’Hara, a customer
- Lewis Taylor as Young Eaglefoot, a young, earnest native American boy who wants to find his place in the world after the destruction of his village.
- Elena Kampouris as Alexia
- Greta Lee as Kara
- Donnie Keshawarz as Pinchas Simkin, Max’s great-grandfather
- Yul Vazquez as Marsha
- Joey Slotnick as Mr. Slick
- Finley Whisby as Michael Octave
- Wayne Wilderson as Young Preppy Man

== Production ==
On September 19, 2013, Adam Sandler was in talks to join Tom McCarthy's The Cobbler, which began shooting in November 2013. Voltage Pictures fully financed the film and it was produced by Mary Jane Skalski. On November 12, 2013, Dan Stevens joined the cast. Dustin Hoffman and Steve Buscemi also joined cast during shooting on November 18, 2013. Other cast members include Melonie Diaz, Method Man, Sondra James, Kevin Breznahan, Greta Lee and Craig Walker. On September 9, 2014, Image Entertainment acquired the US distribution rights to the film for $3.5 million.

=== Filming ===
Principal photography for The Cobbler began on November 11, 2013, in New York City. The production primarily took place on location throughout various neighborhoods in the city, capturing the urban environment central to the film’s story. Filming included interior scenes shot in studio settings as well as exterior shots showcasing the distinct character of New York's streets.

The shoot lasted several weeks, concluding before Adam Sandler began work on his subsequent project, Men, Women & Children. The production team utilized practical sets and real locations to enhance the film’s authentic atmosphere. Various local businesses and residents were involved as extras and support during filming.

Overall, the filming phase allowed the cast and crew to immerse themselves in the city’s diverse cultural backdrop, which was integral to the narrative of The Cobbler.

== Release and reception ==
The Cobbler was released in a limited release and through video on demand on March 13, 2015, and since its release, it has been reported to be the biggest box-office flop of Adam Sandler's career – earning only $24,000 at the U.S. box office in its opening weekend. Outside of North America, the film earned $6.5 million and another $2.3 million from domestic video sales.

=== Critical response ===
The Cobbler was panned by critics. On Rotten Tomatoes, the film has a rating of 10%, based on 72 reviews, with a weighted average score of 3.2/10. The website's critical consensus reads, "The Cobbler represents a slight step up from Adam Sandler's recent comedies, but while its cloying sentiment proves a more palatable substitute for his usual crass humor, it still isn't terribly compelling." On Metacritic, the film has a score of 23 out of 100, based on reviews from 22 critics, indicating "generally unfavorable reviews".

Uri Klein of Haaretz pointed out that while The Cobbler is "one of the few times in Sandler's career in which he has chosen to work for a director with a certain pedigree", and "the plot has fantastical impersonation elements that links it to comedians of an earlier era, such as Jerry Lewis and Danny Kaye", the result is unsatisfying in terms of both plot and characters. The A.V. Club chose the film as the worst film of 2015. The Cobbler was discussed extensively on the October 22nd episode of Chapo Trap House during which the film was largely panned by the show's hosts.

Jared Mobarak of The Film Stage gave the film a positive review, noting that the film "embraces its slightness to warm hearts" and praised Method Man in particular for his performance.

=== Lawsuit ===
The Cobbler was the subject of a copyright infringement lawsuit, in which an individual was accused of illegally downloading the film via peer-to-peer file sharing. The case attracted attention when the presiding judge ruled that an IP address provided by the Internet Service Provider was insufficient to conclusively link the defendant to the infringing activity. This ruling highlighted significant evidentiary challenges in copyright enforcement cases that rely solely on IP address identification to prove infringement. The decision was seen as a significant precedent for defendants in copyright litigation involving digital piracy.

=== Accolades ===
Award	Category	Nominee	Result
Golden Raspberry Award	Worst Actor	Adam Sandler	Nominated
Golden Raspberry Award	Worst Screen Combo	Adam Sandler	Nominated
Golden Raspberry Award	Worst Screen Combo	Any pair of shoes	Nominated
Saturn Awards	Best DVD or Blu-ray Release		Nominated
