= Joshua (2007 film) =

- Theatrical release poster
- Directed by: George Ratliff
- Written by: George Ratliff; David Gilbert
- Produced by: Johnathan Dorfman
- Starring: Sam Rockwell; Vera Farmiga; Jacob Kogan; Celia Weston; Dallas Roberts; Michael McKean
- Cinematography: Benoît Debie
- Edited by: Jacob Craycroft
- Music by: Nico Muhly
- Production company: ATO Pictures
- Distributed by: Fox Searchlight Pictures
- Release dates: January 24, 2007 (Sundance); July 6, 2007 (United States)
- Running time: 106 minutes
- Country: United States
- Language: English
- Box office: $719,968

Joshua (also known as The Devil's Child) is a 2007 American psychological thriller film co-written and directed by George Ratliff. The film stars Sam Rockwell, Vera Farmiga and Jacob Kogan.

Joshua premiered at the 2007 Sundance Film Festival and was released on July 6, 2007, in the United States by Fox Searchlight Pictures. The film received favourable reviews from critics, with many praising the performances, atmosphere and the horror elements, but criticism for its plot and characters.

== Plot ==
Brad and Abby Cairn are an affluent New York couple with two children. Their firstborn, a self-decided conservatively dressed 9-year-old, Joshua, is a child prodigy on the piano and thinks and acts like an adult.

Joshua gravitates toward his uncle Ned as a close friend, but distances himself from his parents, particularly following the birth of his sister Lily. As the days pass, the house regresses from healthy and happy to strange and disorienting. As the baby's whines drive an already strained Abby to the point of a nervous breakdown, Joshua exhibits sociopathic behavior, while Brad finds he cannot help his wife, do well at his demanding job, or match wits with Joshua.

Joshua kills the family's dog, but says he does not know what happened. Unable to feel sadness, he imitates Brad's grief. He next causes a fight between his mother (who is Jewish, but non-religious) and paternal grandmother Hazel (who is an Evangelical Christian and constantly proselytizes Joshua) when he tells his parents he wants to become a Christian. Later, he convinces his mother to play hide-and-seek. As Abby counts, he takes Lily from her crib to hide with him, causing his mother to panic and pass out while searching for them. He then puts Lily back into the crib to make it look as though Abby was hallucinating.

Seeing that Abby is getting worse, Brad takes two weeks off from his job to look after her and the children. When he arrives home, Joshua has gone to the Brooklyn Museum with Lily and Hazel. Joshua frightens Hazel by describing the violent acts of Seth, the Egyptian god of Chaos. At home, Brad watches a videotape of Joshua making Lily cry on purpose, realizing that Joshua is the one who has been making Lily cry incessantly at night. He goes to the museum and sees Joshua attempt to push Lily down a flight of stairs. Joshua stops when he is caught by Hazel but proceeds to push her instead, killing her and disguising it as an accident. Brad confides in Ned that he thinks Joshua did it but Ned does not believe him. Meanwhile, Abby has a psychotic breakdown and is institutionalized.

That night, Brad installs a lock on his bedroom door and tells Joshua that Lily will be sleeping with him, fearing he will attempt to do something to her. He also brings Betsy, a psychologist, to meet Joshua. Betsy comes to the erroneous conclusion that Joshua is being abused, further frustrating Brad. Brad announces that he is sending Joshua away to a boarding school, causing him to run away. Later in the evening, Brad is laying with Lily on his bed lulling her to sleep. Brad then hears Joshua crying, and finds him hiding in the kitchen begging Brad not to send him away. Joshua refuses to crawl out of his hiding place so Brad pulls him out, and Joshua cries out in pain. Brad then discovers a bruise on Joshua's back. Brad asks Joshua who gave him the bruise, but all Joshua says is that he slipped.

The next morning, while going for a walk with Brad and Lily, Joshua steals her pacifier, causing her to cry. When Brad confronts him, Joshua begins to mock him, causing him to strike Joshua. Brad tries to apologize but Joshua further taunts him, driving Brad to beat his son in public, strengthening Joshua's case of abuse and sending Brad to jail for assault. Joshua also frames his father for tampering with Abby's medications, suggesting that Brad will spend the rest of his life in prison, leaving Ned to adopt Joshua and Lily.

Ned later sits with Joshua at the piano, and the two compose a song. Joshua sings about how his parents will never be loved by anyone now, and that he only wanted to be with Ned and got rid of everyone else. It is through this that Ned finally realizes what Joshua has done and looks at him with a disturbed glance.

== Cast ==
- Vera Farmiga as Abby Cairn
- Sam Rockwell as Brad Cairn
- Jacob Kogan as Joshua Cairn
- Celia Weston as Hazel Cairn
- Dallas Roberts as Ned Davidoff
- Michael McKean as Chester Jenkins
- Nancy Giles as Betsy Polschek
- Linda Larkin as Ms. Karen Danforth
- Alex Draper as Stewart Slocum
- Ezra Barnes as Fred Solomon
- Jodie Markell as Ruth Solomon
- Rufus Collins as Henry Abernathy
- Haviland Morris as Monique Abernathy
- Tom Bloom as Joe Cairn
- Jack Cortes as Mr. Wallace "Wally" Danforth

== Release ==
The film was directed by George Ratliff, who co-wrote the screenplay with David Gilbert. It was produced by Johnathan Dorfman and ATO Pictures, and was distributed Fox Searchlight Pictures and 20th Century Fox. The film was a special selection at the Sundance Film Festival in January 2007.

Joshua was given a limited release in the United States on July 6, 2007.

== Music ==
Beethoven's Piano Sonata No. 12 (Funeral March movement) was used widely in the film, and was learned and played by 12-year-old Jacob Kogan. The soundtrack was written by Nico Muhly and was available to download via iTunes.

== Reception ==
=== Box office ===
The film made $53,233 in its opening weekend from 6 screens, averaging $8,538 per theater. It made $482,355 domestically in the United States, and $237,613 in other territories for a total worldwide gross of $719,968.

=== Critical response ===
On Rotten Tomatoes the film has an average rating of 61%, based on 98 reviews, with an average rating of 6.3/10. The site's consensus reads, "Though Joshua is ultimately too formulaic, its intelligence and suspenseful buildup heighten the overall creep factor." On Metacritic, the film scored a 69 out of 100 rating, based on 25 critic reviews, indicating "generally favorable" reviews.

Duane Byrge of The Hollywood Reporter said that the film was a brilliant house-of-horror tale with Hitchcockian flair. Owen Gleiberman of Entertainment Weekly said that the film is "something vitally new... that has a cool and savvy fun with your fears" — he also noted that it is "a superbly crafted psychological thriller". Elizabeth Weitzman of New York Daily News wrote: "None of this would have worked without the ideal child, and Kogan, making his movie debut, gets a difficult role down perfectly. Ratliff avoids turning him into a typical bad seed, and shows the same restraint at nearly every turn. With deliberate pacing, well-placed scares, and a pitch-black sense of humor, Ratliff keeps us guessing until the stunner finish."

Maitland McDonagh of TV Guide gave the film 2.5 stars out of 4, writing: "Ratliff and co-screenwriter David Gilbert are clearly aiming for the highbrow suspense market rather than the down-and-dirty horror crowd, but their script's obviousness strips the story of suspense and turns it into a tedious slog to a predestined end." Mick LaSalle of the San Francisco Chronicle wrote: "Two things: the audience is ahead of the movie, and the movie never catches up. In the first scene we look at the kid, we look at the family and we get it. We get all there is to get. A strangely composed boy sits in his suit and tie, banging away at a Bartók piano piece for a school recital, while his parents ooh and aah over their newborn daughter. Joshua is a very bad kid, and he is going to do very bad things."
