= Don't Worry Baby (film) =

- Directed by: Julian Branciforte
- Screenplay by: Julian Branciforte
- Produced by: Jean-Raphael Ambron; Sam Harper; Thomas Kaier; Brendan McHugh; Nick Shore
- Starring: John Magaro; Christopher McDonald; Dreama Walker; Talia Balsam
- Cinematography: Daniel Katz
- Edited by: Matthew C. Hart
- Music by: Charlie Klarsfeld
- Production companies: Manamarin; The Sight Group
- Distributed by: Orion Pictures; FilmBuff
- Release dates: April 16, 2015 (Sarasota); July 22, 2016
- Running time: 88 minutes
- Country: United States
- Language: English

Don't Worry Baby is a 2015 American comedy drama film written and directed by Julian Branciforte. The film stars John Magaro, Christopher McDonald and Dreama Walker.

== Plot ==
Robert Lang (John Magaro) discovers his father Harry (Christopher McDonald) has a new child with a young woman named Sara-Beth (Dreama Walker) only to discover he also had sex with Sara-Beth shortly before his father did. Robert and Harry become determined to find out who the father of the child is.

== Cast ==
- John Magaro as Robert Lang
- Christopher McDonald as Harry Lang
- Dreama Walker as Sara-Beth
- Talia Balsam as Miriam Lang

== Release ==
The film was screened on April 16, 2015 at the Sarasota Film Festival and wide released on July 22, 2016.

== Reception ==
Review aggregator website Rotten Tomatoes reported a 57% approval rating, with a rating average of 5.5/10, based on 7 reviews. On Metacritic, which assigns a normalized rating out of 100 based on reviews from critics, the film has a score of 55 based on 6 reviews, indicating "mixed or average" reviews. Nick Allen of RogerEbert.com gave the film 2 out of 4 stars. Gary Goldstein of the Los Angeles Times praised John Magaro's acting stating he brought his "A-game".
