= Immortal (2019 film) =

- Directed by: Jon Dabach; Tom Colley; Danny Isaacs; Rob Margolies
- Written by: Jon Dabach
- Produced by: Jon Dabach; Rob Margolies
- Starring: Tony Todd; Dylan Baker; Samm Levine; Agnes Bruckner; Vanessa Lengies; Robin Bartlett
- Cinematography: Tom Colley
- Edited by: Jon Dabach; Danny Isaacs
- Music by: Kieran Kiely
- Release date: October 2019 (Screamfest)
- Running time: 94 minutes
- Country: United States
- Language: English

Immortal is a 2019 American thriller film written by Jon Dabach, directed by Dabach, Tom Colley, Danny Isaacs and Rob Margolies and starring Tony Todd, Dylan Baker, Samm Levine, Agnes Bruckner, Vanessa Lengies and Robin Bartlett.

== Cast ==
- Tony Todd as Ted
- Dylan Baker as Mr. Shagis
- Samm Levine as Warren
- Agnes Bruckner as Vanessa
- Mario Van Peebles as Carl
- Lindsay Mushett as Chelsea
- Vanessa Lengies as Alex
- Brett Edwards as Gary
- Robin Bartlett as Mary

== Release ==
The film premiered at the Screamfest Horror Film Festival in October 2019. Then it was released on demand on September 1, 2020.

== Reception ==
Alex Saveliev of Film Threat rated the film an 8 out of 10.

Grant Kempster of Starburst gave the film a positive review and wrote, “Less a fully formed feature and more a curiosity for fans of the genre, Immortal is well executed despite what appears to be a low budget and does the best it can to squeeze everything it can out of the script and the cast.”
