= Entre nos =

- Directed by: Paola Mendoza; Gloria La Morte
- Written by: Paola Mendoza; Gloria La Morte
- Produced by: Michael Skolnik; Joseph La Morte
- Starring: Paola Mendoza; Sebastian Villada; Laura Montana Cortez
- Cinematography: Bradford Young
- Distributed by: IndiePix Films
- Release dates: April 25, 2009 (Tribeca Film Festival); May 14, 2010 (United States)
- Running time: 81 minutes
- Country: United States
- Language: Spanish

Entre nos (English: Between Us) is a 2009 Spanish-language American drama film directed by Paola Mendoza and Gloria La Morte. The film is a semi-autobiographical tale based on the arrival of Mendoza's own mother to the United States.

The film explores the life of Mariana, a Colombian immigrant attempting to survive on the streets of New York City with her two children. The film has been screened at over 14 film festivals, including the Tribeca Film Festival, where it received an Honorable Mention for Narrative Feature.

== Synopsis ==
Mariana is a Colombian immigrant who has recently traveled to New York with her two children, 10-year-old Gabriel and 6-year-old Andrea, in order to be reunited with her husband, Antonio. However, one day Antonio leaves his family after announcing that he has found work in Miami, and it soon becomes apparent to Mariana that he does not intend to return. Seeing this, she sets out with her children onto the streets of Queens in an attempt to scrape together a decent living. When selling her homemade empanadas fails to bring in any money, Mariana and the children begin collecting aluminum cans off the city's streets. Complications arise, and soon the family finds itself in a desperate day-to-day struggle for survival.

== Cast ==
- Paola Mendoza as Mariana
- Sebastian Villada as Gabriel
- Laura Montana Cortez as Andrea
- Anthony Chisholm as Joe
- Andres Munar as Antonio
- Sarita Choudhury as Preet
- Isabel Sung as Mi-Sun

== Production ==
The screenplay for Entre nos took two years to complete. Due to the strict requirements of the roles, La Morte and Mendoza auditioned over 200 girls for the role of Andrea and over 300 boys for the role of Gabriel before ultimately settling on Cortez and Villada Lopez.

== Release ==
The film made its world premiere at the Tribeca Film Festival in 2009, and subsequently screened on the festival circuit. It was given a limited release in select cinemas in New York and Miami on May 14, 2010.

== Critical reception ==
The film received positive reviews from film critics. Review aggregator Rotten Tomatoes reports that 83% of professional critics gave the film a positive review, with a rating average of 7.2/10.

A review by Andy Webster of The New York Times said of directors Mendoza and La Morte that "both are deft with pacing, composition and atmosphere," in addition to claiming that the scenes involving Mariana's children "have charm and authenticity." V.A. Musetto of The New York Post called Mendoza's performance "heart-tugging." David Noh of Film Journal International described the film as "an indictment of this incredibly wealthy country's indifference to the less fortunate," and praised the performances of Villada and Cortez, referring to the two as "miracles of naturalism." Michelle Orange of The Village Voice called the film "strangely resonant" and claimed the directors have a "mitigating eye for destitution."

According to Slashfilm, Michael Moore included Entre nos on his list of the 20 best films of 2009, in an email Moore sent to those on his mailing list.

== Awards ==
Event	Year	Award	Recipient	Result
Tróia International Film Festival	2009	Prize of the City of Setúbal	Paola Mendoza, Gloria La Morte	Won
Ft. Lauderdale International Film Festival	2009	Jury Award - Best Film	Paola Mendoza, Gloria La Morte	Won
Newport International Film Festival	2009	Audience Award	Paola Mendoza, Gloria La Morte	Won
Tribeca Film Festival	2009	Honorable Mention - Narrative Feature	Paola Mendoza, Gloria La Morte	Won
