= Judy Marte =

American actress

- Born: New York City, U.S.
- Occupation: Actress
- Years active: 2000–present

Judy Marte is an American actress who can be seen in films such as Raising Victor Vargas and On the Outs. She is best known for her roles as rookie officer Tonya Sanchez in the short lived CBS drama NYC 22 and Wanda in Netflix original The Get Down.

== Early years ==
Marte was born and raised on the Lower East Side of Manhattan. She is of Dominican descent.

== Career ==
Marte got her start at the age of 15 when she auditioned for the short film Five Feet High and Rising by the then-unknown Pete Sollett in 2000. Eventually it evolved into the critically acclaimed Raising Victor Vargas, earning Marte her first Independent Spirit Award nomination for Best Debut Performance. She followed that performance with On the Outs, receiving her second Independent Spirit Award nomination for Best Female Lead. Her recent film credits include Maria My Love directed by Jasmine McGlade Chazelle (accepted into the Tribeca Film Festival) and The Mortician directed by Gareth Maxwell Roberts (accepted into the Berlin Film Festival.) Her television credits include guest starring roles on CSI: Miami, on the Network, and Law & Order: Trial by Jury. She is best known for her role as Tonya Sanchez in the 2012 police drama NYC 22.

== Filmography ==
Film
Year	Film	Role	Notes
2000	Five Feet High and Rising	Amanda	Film debut
2002	From an Objective Point of View	Rachel	
2002	Raising Victor Vargas	'Juicy' Judy Gonzalez	
2004	On the Outs	Oz	
2005	Brooklyn Battery	Evelyn	
2007	X's and O's	Trese	Also producer
2009	A Kiss of Chaos	Phoenix	
2010	Raju	Yessenia	Short film
2011	Maria, My Love	Ana	
2011	The Mortician	Jenny	
2018	A Vigilante	Straight Up Shelter Woman	Film
2020	Vampires vs. the Bronx	Carmen Martinez	Film
Television
Year	Title	Role	Notes
2004	The Jury	Marina Lopez	1 episode
2005	Law & Order: Trial by Jury	Marisol Rodriguez	1 episode
2009	CSI: Miami	Megan Hamilton	1 episode
2012	NYC 22	Tonya Sanchez	Main cast
2016	Blindspot	Officer Costello	1 episode
2016–17	The Get Down	Wanda (Zeke's Aunt and Guardian)	9 episodes

== Awards and nominations ==
Year	Group	Award	Result	Film/Show
2004	Independent Spirit Awards	Best Debut Performance	Nominated	Raising Victor Vargas
2005	Independent Spirit Awards	Best Female Lead	Nominated	On the Outs
