= Deborah Copaken =

American photographer and writer

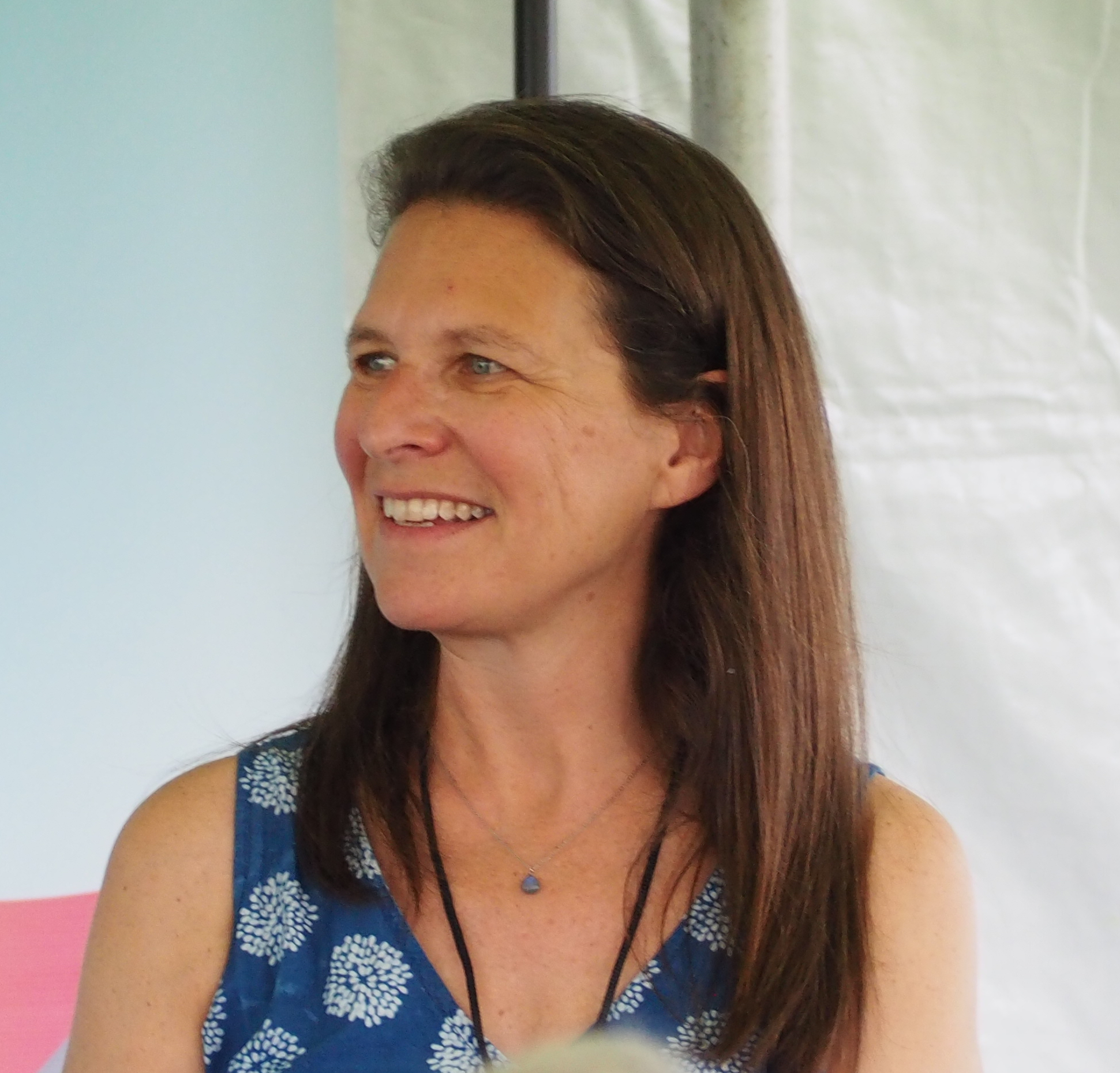
- Born: Deborah Elizabeth Copaken; 1966 (age 59–60); Boston, Massachusetts, U.S.
- Education: Harvard University
- Spouse: Paul Kogan (m. 1993; div. 2018)
- Children: 3; including Jacob
- Writing career
- Subjects: Arts and letters, photography

Deborah Elizabeth Copaken (born 1966) is an American author and photojournalist.

== Early life and education ==
Copaken was born in Boston, Massachusetts, the daughter of Marjorie Ann (née Schwartz) and Richard Daniel Copaken. Her father was a White House Fellow and lawyer. She grew up in Maryland, first in Adelphi, and then from 1970 in Potomac. She has three siblings. She graduated from Harvard University in 1988.

== Career ==
Copaken was a war photographer from 1988 to 1992. She was based in Paris and Moscow, while shooting assignments on conflicts in Zimbabwe, Afghanistan, Romania, Pakistan, Israel, Soviet Union and other places. She was a television producer at ABC and NBC from 1992 to 1998. She first worked as a producer at Day One in ABC News, where she received an Emmy, then in Dateline NBC.

In 2001, she published a memoir of her experiences in war photojournalism, Shutterbabe. Her first novel Between Here and April was published in 2008. In 2009, she released a book of comic essays, Hell is Other Parents. Her second novel, The Red Book (2012), was long-listed for the 2013 Women's Prize for Fiction. In 2016 and 2017, she released two nonfiction books, The ABCs of Adulthood and The ABCs of Parenthood, in collaboration with illustrator Randy Polumbo. In 2021 she published the memoir Ladyparts.

In 2013, Copaken wrote an essay for The Nation detailing sexism she has encountered and observed in her career.

She was a consultant on Darren Star's Younger and was a staff writer on his show Emily in Paris. In 2019, her New York Times Modern Love essay, "When Cupid is a Prying Journalist," was adapted into Episode 2 of Amazon's Modern Love series, with Catherine Keener playing Copaken. She also collaborated with Tommy Siegel of Jukebox the Ghost.

== Personal life ==
Copaken lived in Paris and Moscow before moving to New York City in 1992. She became engaged to and married Paul Kogan in 1993. They have three children: son Jacob (born 1995); daughter Sasha (born 1997); and son Leo (born 2006). In 2018, she and Kogan divorced; as she wrote in The Atlantic, they did so without legal assistance, at a cost of $626.50.

In November 2017 in Oprah.com, she published a 3,500-word account of her supracervical hysterectomy, adenomyosis and trachelectomy, and her subsequent recovery in Nepal. In 2017, Copaken nearly died from vaginal cuff dehiscence, three weeks after having her cervix surgically removed in a tracheloectomy procedure. In July 2018 in The Atlantic, in an essay pertaining to Roe V. Wade, she wrote that three of her five pregnancies were unplanned and that she had undergone two abortions.

Copaken has recounted that she was date raped on the night before her graduation. The next day she reported the incident to the university's health service, but was advised not to report her rape to police by her psychologist as the lengthy legal process might have affected her plans after graduation. She wrote in The Atlantic, 30 years after the incident, that she had recently written to her assailant and that the assailant had called and apologized to her.

== Works ==
- Shutterbabe: Adventures in Love and War (2001) ISBN 9781840184297 – memoir
- Between Here and April (2008) ISBN 9781565125629 – novel
- Hell Is Other Parents: And Other Tales of Maternal Combustion (2009) ISBN 9781401340810 – essay
- The Red Book (2012) ISBN 9781844089017 – novel
- The ABCs of Adulthood: An Alphabet of Life Lessons (2016) ISBN 9781452151915 – nonfiction, illustrations by Copaken and Randy Polumbo
- The ABCs of Parenthood: An Alphabet of Parenting Advice (2017) ISBN 9781452152905 – nonfiction, illustration by Copaken and Polumbo
- Ladyparts (2021) ISBN 9781984855473 – memoir

== Awards ==
- 2025: Best Independent Publisher: Email Newsletters, Webby Awards, for her Ladyparts Substack
