= NYC 22 =

2012 American police procedural drama television series

- Genre: Police procedural; Drama
- Created by: Richard Price
- Starring: Adam Goldberg; Leelee Sobieski; Stark Sands; Judy Marte; Harold House Moore; Felix Solis; Tom Reed; Terry Kinney
- Opening theme: "Heart of the City (Ain't No Love)" by Jay-Z
- Country of origin: United States
- Original language: English
- No. of seasons: 1
- No. of episodes: 13

Production
- Executive producers: Richard Price; Robert De Niro; Jane Rosenthal; Ken Sanzel; James Mangold
- Producer: Mary Rae Thewlis
- Cinematography: Christopher LaVasseur; John Thomas
- Editors: Barry Alexander Brown; Sheri Bylander
- Running time: 44 minutes
- Production companies: Tribeca Productions; Post 109 Productions; CBS Productions

Original release
- Network: CBS
- Release: April 15 – August 11, 2012

NYC 22 (pronounced NYC 2-2) is an American police procedural drama television series that aired on CBS from April 15 to August 11, 2012, as a mid-season replacement for CSI: Miami. On August 29, 2012, CBS canceled the series after one season.

== Premise ==
The series follows a diverse group of rookie New York City Police Department (NYPD) officers as they patrol the streets of Upper Manhattan.

== Cast and characters ==
- Adam Goldberg as Officer Ray "Lazarus" Harper, a divorced Jewish former newspaper reporter, who has a fifteen-year-old daughter, Ruby Harper.
- Leelee Sobieski as Officer Jennifer "White House" Perry, a Marine MP veteran of the Iraq War
- Harold House Moore as Officer Jayson "Jackpot" Toney, a former player in the NBA
- Stark Sands as Officer Kenny McLaren, the son of an NYPD deputy inspector and a fourth generation police officer
- Judy Marte as Officer Tonya Sanchez, whose family has a long history on the wrong side of the law
- Felix Solis as Sgt. Terry Howard, a detective with the 22nd Precinct's Anti-Crime squad
- Tom Reed as Officer Ahmad Khan, an Afghan immigrant
- Terry Kinney as Sgt. Daniel "Yoda" Dean, the rookies' training officer and a 25-year veteran of the force

== Development and production ==
The series first appeared on the development slate at CBS in late 2010, under the name Rookies, after a report that CBS had purchased the series from creators Robert De Niro and Richard Price. In January 2011, the network placed a pilot order.

Casting announcements began in mid-February, with Leelee Sobieski being cast as Jennifer Perry, one of the rookies. Next to board the project were Judy Marte, Tom Reed, and Stark Sands, who all portray rookie cops. Adam Goldberg joined the cast a week later as a former reporter turned rookie cop. Terry Kinney signed on in mid-March as the field training officer for the rookies.

CBS green-lighted production of the series in May 2011 under the new title The 2-2, but the name was changed again when the network announced that the series would premiere on April 15, 2012, as NYC 22. NYC 22 took over the timeslot of CSI: Miami, which had its season shortened slightly to make room for the new drama. The series returned on July 7, 2012, to burn off the remaining episodes.

== Critical reception ==
The show was met with mixed reviews, and holds a Metacritic score of 57 out of 100.

== Episodes ==
According to cast member Stark Sands, NYC 22 episodes were produced by filming order. resolving storylines and character developments. The production order according to him is listed below in the second column.

No.	Production order	Title	Directed by	Written by	U.S. viewers (million)	18–49 rating	Original release date
1	1	"Pilot"	James Mangold	Richard Price	8.86	1.5	April 15, 2012
Field Training Sergeant Daniel "Yoda" Dean supervises six rookie cops as they navigate through their first day at upper Manhattan's 22nd Precinct. Within their first day, they intervene in a domestic dispute, try to stop a gang war, and one of them reconnects with an old friend who has turned to the life of crime.
2	2	"Ransom"	Stephen Gyllenhaal	Richard Price	2.33 (first half-hour); 2.65 (second half-hour)	0.3 (first half-hour); 0.4 (second half-hour)	August 4, 2012
A bodega owner kills two men after they demand a ransom for his daughter. McLaren and Kahn investigate with help from an old homeless man named Pappy Science (John Amos). Lazarus and Sanchez are put on post in front of a prep school after muggings involving students happen in the area. Sanchez meets Lazarus' teenage daughter Ruby. Jackpot and White House are left watching over Harvey, after he is attacked by another jail inmate.
3	3	"Playing God"	Michael Smith	Robert Port	3.59	0.5	July 21, 2012
A car crash leaves a couple pinned in their car, clinging for life. White House helps the wife, who is pregnant, who then goes into labor and Jackpot helps the husband, who is struggling to breathe. McClaren and Kahn witness a veteran detective overly assault a perp, with Kahn thinking about reporting the detective. Lazarus and Sanchez are left watching over the house of an ecstasy dealer that was recently busted. While staying at the house, the officers learn more about each other's personal lives.
4	4	"Samaritans"	Martha Mitchell	David Rambo	2.79 (first half-hour); 2.89 (second half-hour)	0.4 (first half-hour); 0.4 (second half-hour)	August 4, 2012
Lazarus runs into a burning building saving a mother and her child. Lazarus throws the child out the window, with another man catching the child. Lazarus is declared a hero hours after, but the man that caught the child refuses to be identified. After further investigating, Lazarus learns that the man is an Iraq War veteran, who was put on leave, but has not returned to combat since, making him a wanted fugitive by the FBI. White House, an Iraq War veteran herself, is disgusted by this and threatens to report the man. Kahn and Sanchez go undercover in a drug bust. Jackpot and McLaren are trapped in an apartment with a hungry alligator.
5	5	"Jumpers"	Alex Zakrzewski	Ken Sanzel	2.59	0.4	July 28, 2012
White House must stop a man from jumping off a ledge. Lazarus and Sanchez are called on the scene of hate crime on a synagogue. McClaren and Kahn follow an overzealous owner trying to find his missing dog, who also promises a $5,000 reward.
6	6	"Turf War"	Ralph Hemecker	Carter Harris	2.83 (first half-hour); 2.41 (second half-hour)	0.5/2 (first half-hour); 0.5/2 (second half-hour)	August 11, 2012
A landlord refuses to leave his apartment building, just as the city is prepared to tear it down for a high-priced condominium. Jackpot and White House watch over a high school basketball game, where Jackpot meets up with a street hustler (Malik Yoba), who was once his manager and is now managing new prospects. McLaren and Kahn check for street vendor licences, while a pickpocket is on the loose, with McLaren being one of the pickpocket victims.
7	7	"Schooled"	Stephen Gyllenhaal	Diana Son	4.56	0.6	July 14, 2012
McLaren's emotions get the better of him, when a novelist is robbed by a college student for prized books. A boy tags along with Jackpot and White House's day on the job. Lazarus and Sanchez try to find teenage boys responsible for using apples from an apple tree as projectiles.
8	8	"Firebomb"	Felix Alcalá	Talicia Raggs	7.39	1.4	April 22, 2012
The rookies are given their first midnight shift. A firebomb erupts in the block that Lazarus and Sanchez are watching over, with the crime stemming from a drug war. A rapper-turned-actor named Monsta White (Kirk "Sticky Fingaz" Jones), shadows Jackpot and Khan for a movie role. McLaren is partnered with White House, with McLaren catching T-Rex still running with a dangerous gang.
9	9	"Block Party"	Gwyneth Horder-Payton	Lorraine Adams	3.51	0.4	July 14, 2012
Kahn and McLaren try to find a rapist hiding in block party. Jackpot and White House find a skeleton dug up in a construction site, stirring an old missing persons case from fifty years ago. Lazarus and Sanchez handle an intense traffic jam.
10	10	"Lost and Found"	David Platt	Robert Port	6.87	1.2	May 6, 2012
A teenage boy creates a bomb and puts it in his backpack, which is switched with a teenage girl's, with Lazarus and McLaren on the case. Sanchez and White House come across a missing child case involving a woman who was once a drug addict wanting back custody of her son, who is now under the care of a wealthy woman (Samantha Mathis). Jackpot and Khan are in charge of a prison transfer, until their transfer vehicle breaks down.
11	11	"Thugs and Lovers"	Martha Mitchell	David Rambo	7.44	1.2/3	April 29, 2012
White House and Jackpot investigate Geoff Arnhauldt (Richard Kind), a man who thwarted a bank robbery and uncover more things about the man's life. McLaren's father Deputy Inspector Dennis McClaren (Robert John Burke) visits the precinct and discourages him from dating Michelle, T-Rex's sister. Lazarus finally apprehends the wanted man with the shamrock tattoo on his neck, but fears he may face the consequences for not reporting him when he saw him days earlier.
12	12	"Self Cleaning Oven"	Ralph Hemecker	Richard Price	3.16	0.4	July 7, 2012
Fred Wheeler (Vondie Curtis Hall), a drug lord recently released from prison, brings back old feelings of a case that Yoda worked on that put Wheeler away. McLaren and Sanchez take part in brothel bust and help a drugged man (Michael Kostroff), jog his memory to help with a case. Kahn and White House encounter Harvey Williams (Giancarlo Esposito), a charismatic hustler who just hit the lotto.
13	13	"Crossing the Rubicon"	Ken Sanzel	Richard Price	3.39	0.5	July 7, 2012
A hostage situation erupts in a bar that Kahn, Sanchez and Yoda are in, which leads to officer Dana Apple being shot.

=== Ratings ===
According to TV by the Numbers, following the first episode, "The series premiere of NYC 22 drew just a 1.5 adults 18–49 rating at 10pm. That compares with a 2.1 rating average for new episodes of CSI: Miami since January, and a 1.7 for the significantly delayed finale last week." The same site's "Renew-Cancel Index", which analyzes the odds of shows being renewed or canceled by comparing them to the 18–49 ratings for all the scripted shows on the same network, scored the show with a 0.51 index rating (51% of CBS's scripted average) and categorized the show as "certain to be canceled". Four weeks later, on May 13, 2012, the series was canceled.

Season	Episodes	Timeslot	Original airing			Rank	Viewers (in millions)
Season	Episodes	Timeslot	Season premiere	Season finale	TV season	Rank	Viewers (in millions)
1	13	Sunday 10pm/9c (April 15, 2012 – May 6, 2012); Saturday 8pm/7c (July 7, 2012 – August 11, 2012)	April 15, 2012	August 11, 2012	2012	#55	8.77

== DVD release ==
Name	Region 1	Region 2	Region 4
NYC 22: The DVD Edition	January 15, 2013	—N/a	—N/a

== International broadcasts ==
Country	Network(s)	Series premiere	Timeslot	Sources
Brazil	Universal Channel Brasil	July 1, 2012	Sundays at 17:00	
Germany	Diva	September 12, 2012	Wednesdays at 7:00 pm	
Canada	Global	April 15, 2012	Sundays at 10:00 pm	
Hungary	Utca 13	June 3, 2012	Sundays at 12:00 am	
Portugal	TV Séries HD	May 7, 2012	Mondays at 10:10 pm	
Peru	Universal Channel	July 7, 2012	Saturdays 6:00 pm	
Malaysia	BeTV	October 5, 2012	Friday 9:20 pm	
Turkey	Fox Crime	November 23, 2012	Fridays 11:00 pm	
Greece	Skai TV	March 5, 2013	Tuesdays 10:00 pm	
France	Série Club	March 24, 2013	Sunday 8:50 pm	
New Zealand	FOUR	December 2, 2013	Tuesdays 10:30 pm	
Ireland	RTÉ Two	February 6, 2013	Premiered Thurs 12.40am	
Mexico	Canal 5	2014	TBA	
