= She Wants Me =

2012 film by Rob Margolies

- Theatrical release poster
- Directed by: Rob Margolies
- Written by: Rob Margolies
- Starring: Josh Gad; Kristen Ruhlin; Johnny Messner; Melonie Diaz; Aaron Yoo; Hilary Duff
- Production company: Different Duck Films
- Release date: August 3, 2012
- Running time: 85 minutes
- Country: United States
- Language: English

She Wants Me is a 2012 comedy film written and directed by Rob Margolies and starring Josh Gad and Kristen Ruhlin.

== Plot ==
Sam is a writer working on a feature film. His girlfriend Sammy has been promised the lead role, but the producers want a famous actress. After some problems and the return of Sammy’s ex-boyfriend John, the relationship get complicated and they break up. Sam needs to deal with John, who becomes his friend and roommate, his lack of inspiration to write the film, his new single life and a new girlfriend who has had sex with many men, though all he really wants is Sammy back.

== Cast ==
- Josh Gad as Sam Baum
- Kristen Ruhlin as Sammy Kingston
- Johnny Messner as John McCartney
- Aaron Yoo as Max
- Melonie Diaz as Gwen
- Hilary Duff as Kim Powers
- Brit Morgan as Carly
- Alex Solowitz as Drew
- Joel Michaely as Lloyd
- Teddy Lane Jr. as Tyson
- Debra Jo Rupp as Ruth Baum
- Wayne Knight as Walter Baum
- Hayley Angela Gilbert as Penny
- Curt Lowens as Grandpa Arnie
- Brennan Murray as Cashier
- Charlie Sheen as himself

== Casting ==
Margolies originally penned the role of Sam Baum for Jonah Hill, and intended Elliot Page to play Sammy Kingston. Kate Bosworth was originally attached to play the role of Kim Powers, but due to scheduling conflicts with another film, was unable to participate. Hilary Duff replaced her in October 2010.

The cameo role of Charlie Sheen was penned originally for Jeff Goldblum, but when the producers of the film mentioned an option to have Sheen participate, Margolies jumped at the chance to work with him. Sheen eventually became one of the executive producers of the film.
