= Missing Child (film) =

- Directed by: Luke Sabis
- Screenplay by: Luke Sabis & Michael Barbuto
- Starring: Kristen Ruhlin, Charles Gorgano, Luke Sabis
- Music by: Luke Sabis
- Production company: 9W Productions
- Release date: 23 October 2015
- Running time: 80 minutes
- Country: United States
- Language: English
- Budget: $500,000

Missing Child is an American neo-noir psychological thriller film directed and co-written by Luke Sabis, and produced by 9W Productions. It stars Luke Sabis, Kristen Ruhlin, and Charles Gorgano.

== Plot ==
Gia is a young woman in her 20s, with a troubled past. Having never met her natural parents, Gia was raised in foster care where she experienced physical and sexual abuse as a young girl, which lead to many unhealthy experiences and relationships in her teenage years. Now Gia tries to put her past behind focusing on her ambitions. Gia's goals are interrupted when she discovers, through her boyfriend Joe, an age-progressed photo of a missing child, who she resembles. Her friend Debbie, a single mother going through her own financial troubles, is concerned that Gia is repeating unhealthy habits by being with her boyfriend Joe, who is nearly twice Gia's age. Gia, however, develops a stronger bond with Joe, who is supportive of Gia's desire to learn of her roots. More than anything else, she wants an answer to the question of where she came from.

Gia and Joe drive to the house of Henry Whittle, the man they believe may be Gia's father. When Gia sees the room of Henry's daughter she feels a connection, however when she looks at old photos she sees a discrepancy that makes her believe she is not the missing child. Gia is heartbroken but Joe encourages her not to give up hope. Her primal desire to learn about her past drives her to go along with Joe. Henry's bond with Gia becomes stronger. Gia notices similarities between herself and Henry's missing daughter. Hearing Henry speak about his child and wife makes Gia imagine what life would have been, if she was Henry's daughter. While having dinner, Gia and Joe become disoriented and Henry takes on a darker tone.

It becomes clear that Henry has drugged Gia and Joe as the two become incapacitated. Gia and Joe pass out. Gia and Joe lie shackled in the living room. They awaken to see Henry sitting nearby in a rocking chair, viewing them with disgust. Gia has spent her life being figuratively held prisoner to her unresolved past. Now the chains are real. Henry expresses a devout religious side. With a shotgun in his hands, he stands over Joe, condemning him for trying to make Henry believe Gia is his daughter.

Henry shifts his attention to Gia, who he considers equally responsible. Henry sees her as a misguided child who did not have the benefit of his parenting. This is the night he intends to change that. Gia reveals a spiritual side which Henry views as hypocrisy. She endures Henry's ridicule and abuse as she has done in her past with other parental figures in her life. They deal with each other as if it was a dysfunctional father-daughter relationship they shared. Gia becomes defiant. Henry responds by dragging Gia into his missing daughter's bedroom.

While captive, Gia draws a connection between this violence, and the violence and abuse of her own childhood. She begins to identify with Henry's missing daughter. Henry exposes a mentally twisted and unbalanced side. Gia wants to understand this abusive person who could have been her father. She wants to learn more about her disjointed past even if it's through her abusive captor.

Gia questions Henry about his relationship with his daughter. He confesses that he had abused her. It becomes clear to Gia that his abuse had gone further than she ever could have imagined.

== Cast ==
- Kristen Ruhlin as Gia
- Charles Gorgano as Henry
- Luke Sabis as Joe
- Josie DiVincenzo as Kathleen

== Music ==
According to Sabis, something that the characters of Gia and Henry share is a certain level of discomfort in dealing with silence. Because of traumatic events they each hold in their past, neither character is comfortable alone with their own thoughts. These characters always have a TV or radio on, at all times. Originally, Director Luke Sabis had planned not to have any scored music in the film. He wanted the background sounds of the TV and radio to be the score for these troubled characters. When he got deeper into the production, he realized he was being too idealistic with his vision and that some moments could be brought out more with music. Not having the budget to hire someone, Director Sabis fell back on his own musical background, (playing in rock bands earlier in his life) and wrote and performed the score himself. The intention of the scored music was to accentuate the internal emotional lives of Gia and Henry.

== Reception ==
Missing Child was an official selection of the Boston International Film Festival, Big Island Film Festival, Dances with Films, and the Beyond the Beaten Path Film Festival. In Boston, the film won awards for Indie Soul Best Actor (Charles Gorgano) and the Director Special Recognition Award (Luke Sabis). It won Best Feature at the Beyond the Beaten Path Film Festival.

In 2017 the film was featured at the Idyllwild International Festival of Cinema.
