= Rob Margolies =

American film producer and director (born 1983)

- Born: February 28, 1983 (age 43); Rumson, New Jersey, U.S.
- Occupations: Film director Screenwriter; Film producer
- Years active: 2005–present
- Website: developyourmovie.com

Rob Margolies (born February 28, 1983) is an American film producer and director.

Margolies grew up in Rumson, New Jersey and graduated from Rumson-Fair Haven Regional High School in the class of 2001 before going on to study filmmaking at the New York Film Academy.

In 2005, he produced We All Fall Down, a short subject about the Great Plague of 1666. In 2008 he directed Wherever You Are. He directed the 2010 movie Life-ers which stars Kevin Ryan, from the Barry Levinson BBC TV show Copper. He directed the film She Wants Me (2012) starring Josh Gad, Hilary Duff and Kristen Ruhlin with a cameo by Charlie Sheen, who was also an executive producer. He also directed the independent thriller Roommate Wanted (2015), a.k.a. 2BR/1BA, starring Spy Kids star Alexa Vega, Kathryn Morris and CW Greek star Spencer Grammer.

Margolies later directed Weight (2018), which earned him two awards at the 2018 Northeast Film Festival, including "Best Feature Film".

== Directing credits ==
- Wherever You Are (2008)
- She Wants Me (2012)
- Roommate Wanted (2015)
- Weight (2018)
- Yes (2019)
- Immortal (2019)
- Bobcat Moretti (2022)
- In Fidelity (2024)
