= Wherever You Are (film) =

2008 American comedy-drama film

- Directed by: Rob Margolies
- Written by: Rob Margolies
- Produced by: Rob Margolies
- Starring: Jane Adams; Josh Pais; Joe Morton; Dreama Walker; Jacob Kogan
- Cinematography: David Sperling
- Edited by: Jason Stewart
- Music by: Robert Miller
- Production companies: Different Duck Films; Cosmic Haze
- Distributed by: Kanbar Entertainment
- Release dates: August 9, 2008 (Rhode Island International Film Festival); April 3, 2009 (United States)
- Running time: 91 minutes
- Country: United States
- Language: English

Wherever You Are, also known as Lifelines, is a 2008 comedy-drama film from director-screenwriter Rob Margolies. The film addresses the changes within a dysfunctional family after one session of therapy. It is noted for having been filmed in 11 days.

== Release ==
The film had its premiere at the Rhode Island International Film Festival. As of September 2008 it is playing film festivals and it was scheduled for limited release in November 2008. The film has also been presented under the title Lifelines at some festivals.

== Reception ==
Roger Ebert wrote, "Wherever You Are is a fine, strong film. The most impressive thing is how confident and economical the direction is, and how powerful the performances are!"
