= Victor Rasuk =

American actor (born 1985)

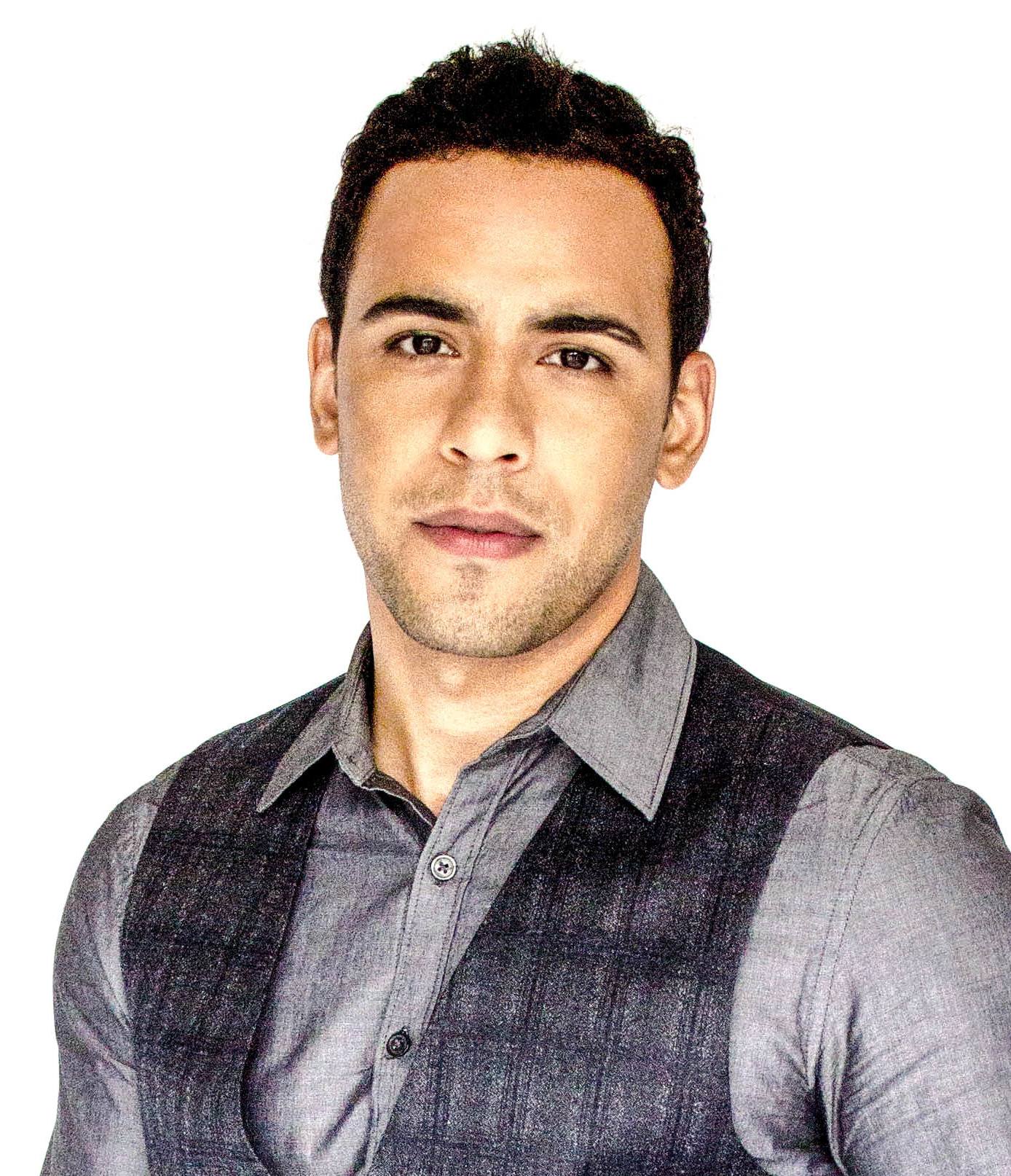
- Rasuk in September 2016
- Born: January 15, 1984 (age 42)
- Occupation: Actor
- Years active: 1999–present

Victor Rasuk (born January 15, 1984) is an American actor.

== Early life ==
Rasuk grew up in New York City. He is the son of Dominican parents. He grew up in East Village, Manhattan.

His mother worked as a seamstress, and his father at an auto shop. He has one brother, actor Silvestre Rasuk, with whom he starred in Raising Victor Vargas. Rasuk attended The Professional Performing Arts School in Hell’s Kitchen as a teenager, and began acting at 14.

== Career ==
Rasuk landed his first film role in the Peter Sollett-directed short film Five Feet High and Rising. Two years later, Sollett suggested expanding the short film into a feature-length film, Raising Victor Vargas, which earned Rasuk a nomination for Best Debut Performance at the 19th Independent Spirit Awards. In his next film, Rock Steady, he played a character named Roc. Two years later, he took a leading role in Haven.

Rasuk portrayed skateboarder Tony Alva in the 2005 biographical drama film Lords of Dogtown. The part included surfing and performing skateboarding tricks. Although the more complicated maneuvers were performed by stuntmen, Rasuk is a method actor and worked on remaining in character both on and off screen. Believing he had mastered skating a huge ramp in only his second week of training, he fractured one of his orbital bones. He says that the accident likely earned him more respect from serious skaters within the cast and crew.

Rasuk starred in the two-season HBO comedy-drama series How to Make It in America. From 2014 to 2015, he starred as Detective Ben Caldwell in the CBS drama series Stalker. In 2020, Rasuk played the male lead Daniel Garcia in the ABC series The Baker and the Beauty.

== Filmography ==
Film
Year	Title	Role	Notes
1999	Flawless	Kid from the neighborhood	Uncredited
2000	Five Feet High and Rising	Victor	Short film
2002	Raising Victor Vargas	Victor Vargas	Nominated—Independent Spirit Award for Best Debut Performance
2002	Rock Steady	Roc	
2004	Haven	Fritz	
2005	Lords of Dogtown	Tony Alva	Nominated—Teen Choice Award for Choice Movie Breakout Performance – Male
2006	I'm Reed Fish	Frank Cortez	
2006	Bonneville	Bo Douglas	
2007	Adrift in Manhattan	Simon Colon	
2007	Spinning into Butter	Patrick Chibas	
2007	Feel the Noise	Javi	
2008	Stop-Loss	Pvt. Rico Rodriguez	
2008	Che	Rogelio Acevedo	
2009	The War Boys	Greg	
2009	Life Is Hot in Cracktown	Manny	
2010	Apples	Valet	Short film
2012	Being Flynn	Gabriel	
2013	Jobs	Bill Fernandez	
2013	A Bag Full of Money	Rasool	Short film
2014	Godzilla	Sergeant Tre Morales	
2015	Fifty Shades of Grey	José Rodriguez	
2017	Fifty Shades Darker	José Rodriguez	
2018	Fifty Shades Freed	José Rodriguez	
2018	The Mule	Rico	
2022	Wildflower	Mr. Vasquez	

Television
Year	Title	Role	Notes
2003	Law & Order: Special Victims Unit	Leon Ardilles	Episode: "Choice"
2005	Law & Order: Trial by Jury	Luis Ramirez	Episode: "Boys Will Be Boys"
2008–2009	ER	Dr. Ryan Sánchez	6 episodes
2010–2011	How to Make It in America	Cameron "Cam" Calderon	Main cast; 16 episodes
2014–2015	Stalker	Detective Ben Caldwell	Main cast; 19 episodes
2016–2017	Colony	Butch "BB"	4 episodes
2019	Jack Ryan	"Disco"	Recurring role
2020	The Baker and the Beauty	Daniel Garcia	Main cast; 9 episodes
2022	Reasonable Doubt	Mike Ortiz	Recurring role; 8 episodes
2023	How I Met Your Father	Oscar	
