= Silvestre Rasuk =

American actor (born 1987)

- Born: September 5, 1987 (age 38); Harlem, New York, U.S.
- Occupation: Actor
- Years active: 2000–present

Silvestre Rasuk (born September 5, 1987) is an American actor.

== Early life ==
Rasuk was born in Harlem, New York, the son of Dominican parents. He has one brother, Victor, with whom he co-starred in the 2002 film Raising Victor Vargas.

== Career ==
In the film Rock Steady, Rasuk played a character named Little Stevie. In 2003, he appeared in Spoonful of Sugar as Raul. In 2004, he appeared in an episode of The Jury and Men Without Jobs. He appeared in the 2009 film Toe to Toe as Rashid.

== Filmography ==
- Ernesto (2000): Ernesto
- Raising Victor Vargas aka Long Way Home (2002): Nino Vargas
- Rock Steady (2002): Little Stevie
- Spoonful of Sugar (2003): Raul
- The Jury (TV series) (2004): Tim Zerznick
- Men Without Jobs (2004): Member of the Nola Darling Fan Club
- New Amsterdam (TV series) (2008): Kid
- Toe to Toe (2009): Rashid
- Law & Order: Special Victims Unit (TV series) (2010): Band Member
- Law & Order: Criminal Intent (TV series) (2010): Volunteer #1
- Our Idiot Brother (2011): Conflicted Kid on Train
- A Gifted Man (2011): Alex Hernandez
- The Big C (2012): Male Student
- An American in Hollywood (2012): Angelo
- Rob the Mob (2014): Homeless Man
- Law & Order (TV series) (2024): Eddie Aguilar

== Music videos ==
- Erin Christine - Say,

== See also ==
- Lists of people from the Dominican Republic
