= Raising Victor Vargas =

- Directed by: Peter Sollett
- Written by: Peter Sollett; Eva Vives
- Produced by: Peter Sollett; Robin O'Hara; Scott Macaulay; Alain de la Mata
- Starring: Victor Rasuk; Judy Marte; Melonie Diaz; Silvestre Rasuk; Kevin Rivera; Altagracia Guzman; Krystal Rodriguez
- Cinematography: Tim Orr
- Edited by: Myron I. Kerstein
- Music by: Brad Jones; Roy Nathanson
- Distributed by: Samuel Goldwyn Films; Fireworks
- Release dates: May 16, 2002 (Cannes Film Festival); March 28, 2003
- Running time: 88 minutes
- Country: United States
- Language: English
- Budget: $800,000
- Box office: $2.9 million

Raising Victor Vargas is a 2002 American comedy-drama film directed by Peter Sollett, and written by Sollett and Eva Vives. The film follows Victor, a Lower East Side teenager, as he deals with his eccentric family, including his strict grandmother, his bratty sister, and a younger brother who completely idolizes him. Along the way he tries to win the affections of Judy, who is very careful and calculating when it comes to how she deals with men. In a subplot, Judy's friend Melonie is depicted in her own romantic adventure. The film was screened in the Un Certain Regard section at the 2002 Cannes Film Festival.

== Plot ==
Victor is a teenager who grew up on the Lower East Side of New York City. He is a cocky young man who is very sure of himself in his love life. He lives in a small apartment with his strict grandmother, bratty sister Vicki, and his younger brother Nino, who is just coming into his own sexuality and looks up to his girl-crazy brother.

At the beginning of the film, Victor is found in the bedroom of Fat Donna, a girl that many in the neighborhood consider unattractive. Word quickly spreads throughout the community amongst his friends, although Victor continuously denies it happened. Seeing this as a huge threat to his reputation, he sets his sights on the beautiful girl of the neighborhood, Judy.

Judy is a good-looking young woman who is continuously hit on by men in her neighborhood, which makes her very cautious about who she chooses in terms of her love life. When Victor comes on to her, she lies, telling him she already has a boyfriend. When Victor finds out this isn't true, he enlists the help of Judy's little brother Carlos, on the condition that Victor introduce him to Victor's sister Vicki, who Carlos is attracted to. Judy ultimately says yes to Victor's advances to keep her safe from the other boys who harass and follow her constantly.

During this time, we also see Judy's friend Melonie and her romantic dealings with Harold, Victor's friend. Their romance ultimately results in their sleeping together, and Melonie reveals to Harold the real reasons why Judy agrees to go out with Victor. Harold tells Victor, who goes to confront Judy. When Victor invites her over to dinner at his house, she believes he's doing so to impress his family and better his reputation. Things go wrong when Victor's grandmother recognizes the lipstick on the glass from Judy's earlier visit to their apartment, and becomes irate. Judy leaves, the grandmother tells Victor if he goes after the girl that she will change the locks. He goes after her, of course. Ultimately, they decide to stay together, with Victor saying that he invited her to see his family to see who he really is. When Victor returns to his apartment, the grandmother has not kicked him out. He makes peace with her, and the family is able to come together with a greater understanding of each other as individuals, and as a family unit.

== Cast ==
- Victor Rasuk as Victor Vargas
- Donna Maldonado as Donna
- Kevin Rivera as Harold
- Krystal Rodriguez as Vicki
- Judy Marte as Judy
- Melonie Diaz as Melonie: a leader of the Pool Boys.
- Matthew Roberts as Hector
- Alexander Garcia as Al
- John Ramos as Macho
- Theresa Martinez as Judy's Mom
- Altagarcia Guzman as Grandma
- Silvestre Rasuk as Nino: a henchman to Melonie and the enforcer of the Pool Boys
- Wilfree Vasquez as Carlos: a soldier of the Pool Boys
- Juan I. Lebron as Israel: a member of the Pool Boys
- Randy Luna as Pool Boy #3
- Jeff Knite as Pool Boy #4
- Jacqueline Rosario as Singer
- Joe Rosario as Security Guard
- Gladys Austin as Social Worker

== Production ==
The film was adapted from Sollett's 2000 28 minute coming-of-age short film Five Feet High and Rising. The film is a drama surrounding a 12-year-old boy from New York City's Lower East Side, Victor, and his pursuit of an older girl named Amanda. Shooting took place on the Lower East Side, where spacing concerns prompted the use of 16mm film cameras. Five Feet High and Rising went on to win awards at Cannes, Sundance, Aspen and SXSW. Its success was the reason for its adaptation into the 2002 film Raising Victor Vargas.

== Reception ==
=== Box Office ===
In its opening weekend, the film grossed $33,166 according to Box Office Mojo. The movie grossed a total of $2.1 million in the U.S. and Canada, $737,455 internationally, and $2.8 million worldwide.

=== Critical and Audience Response ===
On Rotten Tomatoes, the film holds a 96% rating based on 108 reviews from critics and an 83% rating from over 5000 audience members. The site's critics consensus reads, "A coming-of-age tale marked by its authenticity” while the audience frequently describes the film as "charming," "refreshing," and "authentic." On IMDB, the film has an average rating of 7.2/10 from 154 User reviews. Many user reviews claim the movie is authentic and a good representation of teenagehood. Metacritic, also assigned the film a score of 83%, based on 31 critics, indicating "universal acclaim".

Roger Ebert praised the film for its actors and the relationship between the film's main characters, writing that the film "tells the heartwarming story of first love that finds a balance between lust and idealism. Acted by fresh-faced newcomers who never step wrong, it sidesteps the cliches of teenage coming-of-age movies and expands into truth and human comedy. It's the kind of movie you know you can trust, and you give yourself over to affection for these characters who are so lovingly observed."

== Awards ==
Awards and Nominations
| Year | Award | Nominee | Category | Status |
|---|---|---|---|---|
| 2002 | Cannes Film Festival | Peter Sollett | Un Certain Regard Award, Golden Camera | Nominee, Nominee |
| 2002 | Deauville Film Festival | Peter Sollett | Grand Special Prize | Winner |
| 2003 | Gotham Awards | Peter Sollett, Judy Marte, Victor Rasuk | Breakthrough Award | Nominee, Nominee, Nominee |
| 2003 | Humanitas Prize | Peter Sollett, Eva Vives | Sundance Film | Nominee, Nominee |
| 2004 | Film Independent Spirit Awards | Alain de la Mata, Robin O'Hara, Scott Macaulay, Peter Sollett, Eva Vives, Judy Marte, Victor Rasuk | Best Feature, Best First Screenplay, Best Debut Performance | Nominee, Nominee, Nominee, Nominee, Nominee, Nominee, Nominee |
| 2004 | Online Film Critics Society Awards | Peter Sollett | Best Breakthrough Filmmaker | Nominee |
| 2002 | San Sebastian International Film Festival | Peter Sollett | Made In Spanish Award | Winner |
| 2003 | Viennale | Peter Sollett | Reader Jury of the "Standard" | Winner |
| 2004 | Online Film & Television Association | Victor Rasuk | Best Breakthrough Performance: Male | Nominee |
| 2003 | Village Voice Film Poll | Best First Feature | Raising Victor Vargas | Winner |
