= Kristen Ruhlin =

American actress (born 1984)

- Born: June 15, 1984 (age 41)
- Occupation: Actress
- Years active: 2007–present

Kristen Ruhlin is an American actress. She is known for her roles in The Girl in the Park, One Life to Live, Human Giant, and She Wants Me.

== Personal ==
Ruhlin grew up in Charleston, West Virginia and graduated from Charleston Catholic High School.

== Filmography ==
- 2007 The Girl in the Park, with Kate Bosworth, Keri Russell and Sigourney Weaver.
- 2007 Human Giant, TV show with Jonah Hill.
- 2010 Life-ers, TV movie from the producers of CBS and Darren Starr's We Need Girlfriends.
- 2012 She Wants Me, starring as Sammy Kingston with Josh Gad, Hilary Duff, Wayne Knight and Charlie Sheen.
- 2012 Stuck, with Madeline Zima.
- 2013 The Road Home, with Lily Tomlin.
- 2015 Missing Child
