= Peter Sollett =

American film director and screenwriter (born 1976)

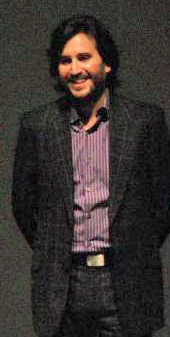
- Sollett at the 2008 Toronto International Film Festival
- Born: February 9, 1976 (age 50); New York City, U.S.
- Education: New York University
- Occupation: Filmmaker
- Spouse: Eva Vives
- Children: 1
- Writing career
- Years active: 2000–present

Peter Sollett (born January 1, 1976) is an American film director and screenwriter known for his feature films Raising Victor Vargas (2002) and Nick & Norah's Infinite Playlist (2008).

== Early life and education ==
Sollett was born on January 1, 1976 in Bensonhurst, Brooklyn, New York. He is Jewish. His father is a newspaper photographer, which he says inspired him to pick up a camera.

== Career ==
Sollett's first film was Five Feet High and Rising, a 26-minute short film about the growth and coming-of-age of teenager Victor Vargas. He and Eva Vives wrote Five Feet High and Rising as their thesis film in 1998 at New York University's Tisch School of the Arts and he served as the film's director, cinematographer and editor. After he had the opportunity to work with professionals in the film industry at the Cannes Residence Programme, the short film went on to screen on the festival circuit and won a number of awards at the Sundance Film Festival, Cannes Film Festival, Aspen Shortsfest, Valencia International Film Festival, South by Southwest Film Festival and Cinema Jove International Film Festival. Two years after the release of Five Feet High and Rising, Sollett and Vives reunited to collaborate on a follow-up project that became Raising Victor Vargas, originally named Long Way Home. While Sollett says that Five Feet High and Rising was purely autobiographical and based on the Italian, Jewish neighborhood he grew up in Brooklyn, he and Vives decided to create another film directly about the experiences of the main characters Victor and Judy, continuing on two years after the film left off. Using the same cast as the original short film, he wrote an action-and-dialogue screenplay which he did not give to any of the actors to encourage them to improvise and create a feeling of spontaneity and authenticity. Raising Victor Vargas earned Sollett three Independent Spirit Award nominations in the categories of Best Film, Best Director and Best First Screenplay, as well as other awards and nominations at the Viennale, San Sebastián International Film Festival, Online Film Critics Society Awards, Deauville Film Festival, Gotham Awards and the Humanitas Prize.

Sollett directed the 2008 film Nick & Norah's Infinite Playlist, starring Michael Cera and Kat Dennings, also set in New York City. Though he did not write the film, only directed Lorene Scafaria's script, based on a novel of the same name by Rachel Cohn and David Levithan, he drew from his own experiences when making the film. The film takes place over one night in Manhattan, where a number of New Jersey teenagers have commuted in for the night—something Sollett was familiar with and often did himself, having lived in Brooklyn as a child and Staten Island as an adult. Many of his personal favorite Manhattan locations also featured in the film, including Katz's Deli and the Lower East Side's Mercury Lounge.

Sollett was a member of faculty at Columbia University School of the Arts. He now teaches at USC School Of Cinematic Arts.

In January 2019, it was reported that Sollett would be directing the film adaptation of Minecraft. However, as of April 2022, he was replaced by Jared Hess.

== Personal life ==
Sollett says that the character of Victor Vargas is his fantasy of his teenage self and that Victor is the boy he would like to have been, much more confident than his actual self, describing himself as "the kid in [his] neighbourhood who watched all that stuff going on between boys and girls but could never access whatever juice those guys had to do it." In contrast, he felt that Nick O'Leary of Nick & Norah's Infinite Playlist is "not dissimilar" to his teenage self.

=== Influences ===
Sollett was influenced by François Truffaut, John Cassavetes, Federico Fellini, Martin Scorsese and Ingmar Bergman.

== Filmography ==
Film

- Raising Victor Vargas (2002) (Also writer and producer)
- Nick & Norah's Infinite Playlist (2008)
- Freeheld (2015)
- Metal Lords (2022)

Short film

- Cinema 16: American Short Films (2006)

TV series

Year	Title	Episode(s)
2012	Ben and Kate	"Emergency Kit"
2016	Vinyl	"He in Racist Fire"
2018	The Path	"The Gardens at Giverny"
2018	The Path	"The Door"
2018	Rise	"This Will God Willing Get Better"
2019	The Village	"Good Thing"
2019	The Village	"In Your Bones"
2019	Almost Family	"Fertile AF"
2019–2024	Evil	"Rose390"
2019–2024	Evil	"Room390"
2019–2024	Evil	"The Demon of the Road"
2019–2024	Evil	"The Demon of Algorithms"
2019–2024	Evil	"How to Train a Dog"
2021	Ordinary Joe	"Happy Birthday Jenny"
2023	Your Honor	"Part Eleven"
2023	Your Honor	"Part Twelve"
2023	Your Honor	"Part Fifteen"
2023	Your Honor	"Part Sixteen"
2025–2026	Elsbeth	"Tearjerker"
2025–2026	Elsbeth	"And Then There Were Nuns"
2025–2026	Elsbeth	"Deadutante"
2025	Peacemaker	"Need I Say Door"
2026	It's Not Like That	"Transition Townhomes"
2026	It's Not Like That	"The Space I Keep For You"
2026	CIA	"Inside Men"
