= Jon Glaser =

American actor

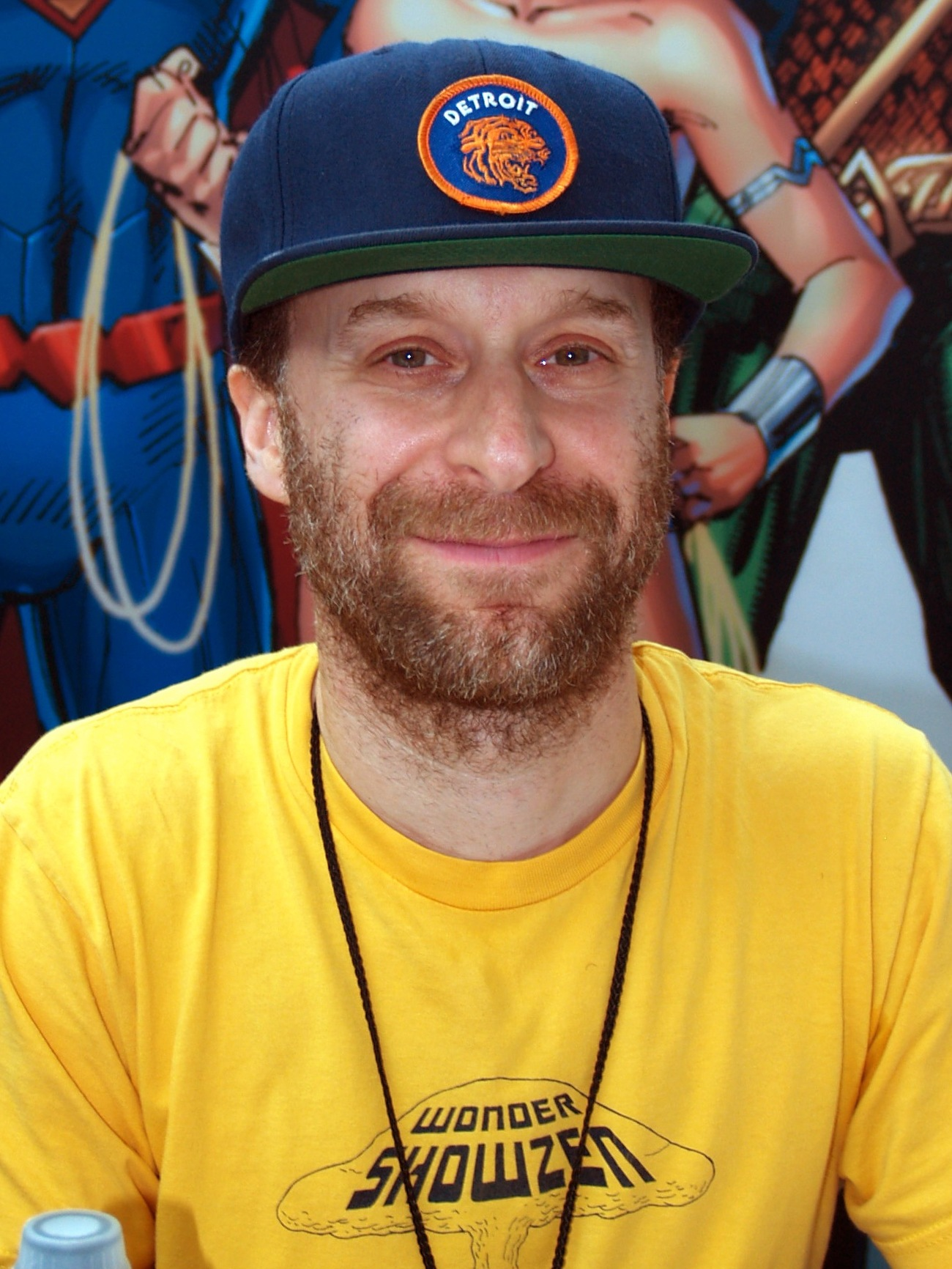
- Glaser at the New York Comic Con 2015
- Born: Chicago, Illinois, U.S.
- Education: University of Michigan
- Occupations: Actor, comedian, writer
- Years active: 1994–present
- Children: 2
- Website: Official page on Tumblr

Jon Glaser is an American actor, comedian, and writer. He is best known for his work as a writer and sketch performer for many years on Late Night with Conan O'Brien, creating and starring in the Adult Swim series Delocated and Neon Joe, Werewolf Hunter as well as the truTV series Jon Glaser Loves Gear.

Glaser had a recurring role as Councilman Jeremy Jamm on the NBC series Parks and Recreation and appeared as Laird on the HBO series Girls. Glaser was also a writer on the Comedy Central sketch series Inside Amy Schumer.

== Early life and education ==
Glaser was born in Chicago on June 20, 1968, and was raised in Southfield, Michigan, a suburb of Detroit. He attended Southfield-Lathrup High School, graduating in 1986. He is a graduate of the University of Michigan, where he performed in the sketch comedy troupes Comedy Company and Just Kidding with Jon Hein, H. Anthony Lehv, Matthew Schlein, Kristin Sobditch, Sara K. Mathison, and Craig Neuman. He is Jewish.

== Career ==
Jon Glaser is a five-time Emmy nominee with the writing staff of Late Night with Conan O'Brien. He has appeared in the films Pootie Tang, School for Scoundrels, and Be Kind Rewind, and he has guest-starred on comedy programs such as Curb Your Enthusiasm, Louie, Wonder Showzen, Bob's Burgers and Aqua Teen Hunger Force. He was also a lead voice actor in several animated comedy programs such as Stroker & Hoop, Freak Show, and Lucy, the Daughter of the Devil. In 2012, he began a recurring role as Leslie Knope's rival, Councilman Jeremy Jamm in the fifth and sixth seasons of the NBC sitcom Parks and Recreation.

Glaser is the creator and star of the live-action Adult Swim series Delocated, about "Jon", a man in the witness protection program with his own reality show. The show aired its final episode on March 7, 2013. Glaser's Delocated character, "Jon" was also featured as a DJ on an Adult Swim-themed radio station in the video game Saints Row: The Third. In February 2012, Glaser appeared as the spokesman in a series of Subway commercials playing his Delocated character.

Glaser was a member of the mainstage cast of The Second City during the mid-1990s, performing alongside future Saturday Night Live head writer Adam McKay and cast member Rachel Dratch, as well as future Mr. Show and 30 Rock cast member Scott Adsit. In Second City's award-winning revue Pinata Full of Bees, which was directed by Tom Gianas, Glaser sang about the importance of not betraying a friendship by pretending not to have legs in order to play in a wheelchair basketball league. He also provided musical accompaniment for the show's climax by drumming in a demonic pig mask, and appeared onstage throughout the show to pass judgement on audience members for laughing at jokes he considered socially irresponsible.

Early in his television career, Glaser wrote and occasionally performed on the short-lived sketch comedy programs The Jenny McCarthy Show on MTV and The Dana Carvey Show. He also made one appearance as a correspondent on The Daily Show in 2004. Glaser is also known for his comedic partnership with H. Jon Benjamin. For a number of years they hosted a live sketch show together in New York City called Midnight Pajama Jam, and have also performed stand-up comedy together for many years, often playing characters who bicker and argue with each other while on stage. Glaser created and starred in the Comedy Central web-series Tiny Hands, which has been shown on the channel's short film series Atom TV a number of times. More recently Glaser worked as a contributing writer and occasional performer on the sketch comedy programs Human Giant, Jon Benjamin Has a Van and Nick Swardson's Pretend Time, as well as providing voices in the animated film Aqua Teen Hunger Force Colon Movie Film for Theaters. In 2009, Glaser worked as the head writer and segment producer on the HBO sports program Joe Buck Live. Glaser also appeared on the ESPN classic show Cheap Seats, providing such roles as "Beamy" and the "Score Settler".

Glaser is currently a voice actor for the animated version of the cartoon strip Get Your War On and appearing as "Video Cowboy" in ESPN's Mayne Street starring Kenny Mayne. Glaser was also the lead singer in the New York City-based comedy band "Detroit Octane"; they performed their song "Barack Obama-sistible" (sung to the tune of the Robert Palmer song "Simply Irresistible") on Late Night with Conan O'Brien on June 17, 2008. He was also the bass player in "A Matter of Trust", another comedy music project he was involved in with comedians H. Jon Benjamin, Todd Barry and Tom Shillue. The band's gimmick was that they only played the Billy Joel song "A Matter of Trust" over and over again, and refused to play any other songs. They performed as an opening act for The New Pornographers in 2006. He also appeared in seasons 2, 3 and 4 of HBO's Girls as Laird, a recovering addict and neighbor of Lena Dunham's character Hannah. He appears in the film Trainwreck.

Glaser's first published book My Dead Dad Was in ZZ Top, was released on February 8, 2011.

Glaser appeared on Ken Reid's TV Guidance Counselor Podcast on April 24, 2015. The episode was recorded live as part of the 2015 Eugene Mirman Comedy Festival in Boston.

Glaser's mockumentary series Jon Glaser Loves Gear premiered October 25, 2016 on truTV.

Glaser's mini-series for Adult Swim, Neon Joe, Werewolf Hunter premiered on December 7, 2015.

== Personal life ==
Glaser has two children, a son and a daughter, and is married. They live in Brooklyn, New York. He is a fan of Detroit City FC.

== Filmography ==
=== Film ===
Year	Title	Role	Notes
2001	Pootie Tang	Recording Engineer	as John Gläser
2005	Perfect Partner	N/A	
2006	School for Scoundrels	Ernie	
2007	Aqua Teen Hunger Force Colon Movie Film for Theatres	CIA Agent #2 (voice)	
2008	Be Kind Rewind	West Coast Video Employee NYC	
2008	The Toe Tactic	Tooot	
2008	Baby Mama	Vegan Waiter	
2008	The Rocker	Billy	as Jonathan Gläser
2008	A Bad Situationist	Caterer	
2012	The Dictator	Obnoxious Customer	
2013	Tuna	Ralph	as John Gläser
2014	Growing Up and Other Lies	Donkey	
2014	Search Party	Marty	
2015	Trainwreck	Schultz	
2015	Sisters	Dan	
2019	Wine Country	Ted Talk (voice)	
2019	Hustlers	Mark	
2020	Omniboat: A Fast Boat Fantasia	N/A	
2021	Don't Look Up	Meow Man	
2024	Friendship	Big Sam	
TBA	The Adventures of Drunky	TBA (voice)	Post-production

=== Television ===
Year	Title	Role	Notes
1994	Lois Kaz	Various	
1995	The Armando Diaz Experience, Theatrical Movement and Hootenanny	Various	
1996	The Dana Carvey Show	Street Preacher / Farm Animal Watching the Oscars	
1998–2008	Late Night with Conan O'Brien	Various	31 episodes
1999–2000	Upright Citizens Brigade	Various	2 episodes
2000	Saturday Night Live	Guy at Bar	Uncredited; Episode: "Alan Cumming/Jennifer Lopez"
2000–2001	TV Funhouse	Hojo (voice)	8 episodes
2003	Aqua Teen Hunger Force	Oog / Jerry (voice)	as Jonathan Glaser; 3 episodes
2004–2006	Cheap Seats	Various (voice)	16 episodes
2004–2005	Stroker & Hoop	Stroker / John Strockmeyer (voice)	13 episodes
2005–2006	Wonder Showzen	Dr. Rawstein / Mr. Story	2 episodes
2005	O'Grady	Various	2 episodes
2005–2006	Lucy, the Daughter of the Devil	DJ Jesus (voice)	11 episodes
2006	Freak Show	Various	7 episodes
2007–2008	Human Giant	Various	4 episodes
2008	The Line	N/A	3 episodes
2008	Superjail!	Singer (voice)	Uncredited; Episode: "Combaticus"
2008–2009	Mayne Street	Video Cowboy	13 episodes
2009–2013	Delocated	Jon	30 episodes
2009	30 Rock	Mike	Episode: "Into the Crevasse"
2010	Nick Swardson's Pretend Time	Professor	Episode: "Mudslide Junction"
2011–2020	Bob's Burgers	Various (voice)	4 episodes
2011	Jon Benjamin Has a Van	Pvt. Nathan Glaser	Episode: "Border"
2011	Curb Your Enthusiasm	Doorman	Episode: "Larry vs. Michael J. Fox"
2011–2014	The Heart, She Holler	Bofum	2 episodes
2012–2015	Parks and Recreation	Councilman Jeremy Jamm	18 episodes
2013–2017	Girls	Laird Schlesinger	12 episodes
2013	The Greatest Event in Television History	Henry Rush	Episode: "Too Close for Comfort"
2013–2016; 2022	Inside Amy Schumer	Various	5 episodes
2014	TripTank	Chris (voice)	
2015	Louie	Jon	Episode: "Untitled"
2015	Conan	President Brody Sandals (voice)	2 episodes
2015	Difficult People	Adam Balk	Episode: "Even Later"
2015–2017	Neon Joe, Werewolf Hunter	Neon Joe	10 episodes
2016	Archer	Whitney (voice)	Episode: "Deadly Prep"
2016–2019	Jon Glaser Loves Gear	Himself	13 episodes
2016–2019	Your Pretty Face Is Going to Hell	Torture Consultant	2 episodes
2017	Sasheer Zamata Party Time	Himself	Episode: "Jon Glaser Stand-Up"
2019	Living with Yourself	Henry	2 episodes
2019	Mr. Robot	Tobias	Episode: "404 Not Found"
2020	Our Cartoon President	Larry Kudlow (voice)	3 episodes
2020	Dicktown	Mark Tagliano (voice)	6 episodes
2021	Kevin Can F**k Himself	Patty	Episode: "New Patty"
2021	Teenage Euthanasia	N/A	Episode: "Adventures in Beetle Sitting"
2021	Fairfax	N/A	Episode: "Chernobylfest"
2022–2023	Single Drunk Female	Nathaniel	6 episodes
2022	Law & Order: Special Victims Unit	Jackson Wright	Episode: "Sorry If It Got Weird for You"
2022	Life & Beth	Gerald	3 episodes
2023	White House Plumbers	Steve the CIA Disguise Maker	1 episode
2024	Ghosts	Jeremy Lefkowitz	Episode: "Hello, Brother"
2024	What We Do in the Shadows	Sports Demon	Episode: "March Madness"
2024	Dinner with the Parents	Donnie	Main
2025	Running Point	Sean Murphy	5 episodes
2025–present	Wylde Pak	Chuck (voice)	Recurring
2026	President Curtis	Chef Matteo (voice)	Episode: "David"
TBA	Scroll Wheel of Time	Waiter	Episode: "Josephine Baker"
TBA	The Adventures of Drunky	N/A	
