= List of Curb Your Enthusiasm episodes =

The American television sitcom Curb Your Enthusiasm premiered with an hour-long special on HBO on October 17, 1999. It was followed by a ten-episode first season that began airing on October 15, 2000.

The series was created by Larry David, who stars as a fictionalized version of himself. The series follows Larry in his life as a well-off, semi-retired television writer and producer in Los Angeles. Also starring are Cheryl Hines as his wife, Cheryl; Jeff Garlin as his best friend and manager, Jeff; Susie Essman as Jeff's wife, Susie; and J. B. Smoove as Larry's housemate, Leon. Curb Your Enthusiasm features many celebrity guest star appearances, fictionalized to varying degrees.

In August 2022, the series was renewed for a twelfth and final season, that premiered on February 4, 2024. During the course of the series, 120 episodes of Curb Your Enthusiasm aired, concluding on April 7, 2024.

== Series overview ==
Season	Episodes	Originally released	
Season	Episodes	First released	Last released
Pilot	1	October 17, 1999	
1	10	October 15, 2000	December 17, 2000
2	10	September 23, 2001	November 25, 2001
3	10	September 15, 2002	November 17, 2002
4	10	January 4, 2004	March 14, 2004
5	10	September 25, 2005	December 4, 2005
6	10	September 9, 2007	November 11, 2007
7	10	September 20, 2009	November 22, 2009
8	10	July 10, 2011	September 11, 2011
9	10	October 1, 2017	December 3, 2017
10	10	January 19, 2020	March 22, 2020
11	10	October 24, 2021	December 26, 2021
12	10	February 4, 2024	April 7, 2024

== Episodes ==
=== Pilot (1999) ===
Title	Directed by	Story by	Original release date
"Larry David: Curb Your Enthusiasm"	Robert B. Weide	Larry David	October 17, 1999
In the HBO special upon which the series was based, Larry approaches HBO about having his own hour-long HBO special. After a long hiatus, Larry begins performing stand-up comedy again in order to prepare for the special. However, hours away from the show's scheduled filming, Larry becomes nervous and lies to the HBO executives about the illness of his nonexistent stepfather in order to get the special canceled. Jeff's mistress, Becky, goes with Larry to pick up a tie for Jeff. After Larry and Becky are seen crossing through the park, Cheryl accuses him of cheating. He tells Cheryl that Becky is the girlfriend of a college friend.

=== Season 1 (2000) ===
The first season introduces Larry's post-Seinfeld world, where he is wealthy, has a loving wife and a best friend, and manages to offend many people around him.

Guest stars include: Ted Danson, Paul Dooley, Wayne Federman, Kathy Griffin, Richard Lewis, Julia Louis-Dreyfus, Brad Hall, Laraine Newman, Bob Odenkirk, Julie Payne, Mary Steenburgen, Wanda Sykes, Nia Vardalos, Lisa Ann Walter, and Lucy Webb.

No. overall	No. in season	Title	Directed by	Story by	Original release date
1	1	"The Pants Tent"	Robert B. Weide	Larry David	October 15, 2000
Larry wears new pants which bunch up at the front when he is sitting down. At Cheryl's suggestion, he and her friend Nancy (Robin Ruzan) go to a movie theater. An argument there between Larry and Sofia (Sofia Milos) leads to tensions between him and his friend Richard Lewis. After leaving he and Nancy encounter Sofia outside with Richard, discovering she is his girlfriend. Richard berates him for jeopardizing his six-week relationship with Sofia, whom he loves, has had sexual intercourse with and thinks is the one. Larry jokingly refers to Cheryl as "Hitler" during a car speakerphone conversation with Jeff, not realizing at first that Jeff's Holocaust-sensitive parents (Mina Kolb, Louis Nye) are in Jeff's car and are offended. Larry apologizes to them, but they are further offended by Larry not going upstairs to see Jeff and Susie's daughter, Sammy. (Note: Later their daughter, Sammi.) Larry's excuse to Cheryl in regard to the tension between him and Jeff involves Kathy Griffin, which Cheryl realizes is fabricated when Griffin meets them all at a restaurant.
2	2	"Ted and Mary"	David Steinberg	Larry David	October 22, 2000
Larry and Cheryl go on a double date at a bowling alley with new celebrity friends Ted Danson and Mary Steenburgen, where Larry's shoes are mistakenly given to someone else. He confronts the thief on his next visit and retrieves his shoes. Larry goes shopping with Mary and her mother (Anne Haney), where he buys what he describes as a half-shirt, half-jacket, which he later tries to return. Larry and Cheryl believe they are uninvited to a Paul Simon concert after Larry reacted with disgust at lunch when he realized he had been drinking out of Mary's mother's glass.
3	3	"Porno Gil"	Robert B. Weide	Larry David	October 29, 2000
Larry and Cheryl are invited to former porn star Gil Bang's (Bob Odenkirk) party after Larry misdials Gil. Larry becomes lost driving there. First an elderly woman argues with Larry and tears up his directions to Gil's house, and then a man Larry offended earlier at a driving range refuses to give him directions. Cheryl, who planned to only stop by the party for 15 minutes after they ate at a restaurant, is annoyed that it is a dinner party. Gil disgusts Cheryl with a graphic tale from his porn days, and Gil's wife shouts at Larry because Larry accidentally broke a rare lamp and did not adhere to her house rule of taking his shoes off. In the hospital after a routine checkup, Jeff says he needs emergency bypass surgery and asks Larry to hide his porn collection from Susie in case he dies. Larry watches one of the videos in this stash, starring Gil, when Jeff's parents walk in on him.
4	4	"The Bracelet"	Robert B. Weide	Larry David	November 5, 2000
Cheryl is upset by Larry continuing to watch a football game on TV instead of talking to her after she returns from a trip. He wants to buy a bracelet for her, but he is not buzzed into the jewelry store because he is wearing his workout clothes and looks scruffy. Richard then decides to buy it for Sofia, which upsets Cheryl. Larry and Richard help a demanding and belligerent blind man, Michael (Patrick Kerr), move into his apartment. Larry returns to a restaurant where he accidentally left his credit card, but the head waiter has blocked Larry's car with his own, and refuses to move it because Larry did not tip him. Larry runs to the jewelry store to buy the bracelet before Richard can; they fight outside the door, so the staff do not buzz either of them in.
5	5	"Interior Decorator"	Andy Ackerman	Larry David	November 12, 2000
Larry, who injured his finger fighting with Richard, is angered by the operations of his doctor's office when a patient (Marissa Winokur) whose appointment was after his is seen first, after he was chivalrous and let her exit the elevator first, because she signed in before he did, as explained to him by the charge nurse (Lisa Ann Walter). He cannot pay for parking as he has no cash on him and has to borrow $3 from the parking lot attendant. This causes him to miss his appointment with Diane Keaton. Cheryl hires an interior decorator, Carmen (Rose Abdoo), who also works for Diane. Larry loses Diane's phone number and the decorator refuses to give it to him, which causes Larry to fire her. Larry is outraged when his lawyer (Nia Vardalos) — who is also his doctor's wife — bills him $1,500 for reading his script, so he fires her. He pays the other attendant (played by Oscar Nunez in his first television role) $10 to give to the first attendant, but is later confronted in the parking garage by the first attendant, who does not believe his story. He is forced to give her a $20 as this is all he has on him, but then he once again cannot pay for parking and has to borrow it from his ex-lawyer. He fights with the decorator at Diane's house and injures his finger again. Back at the doctor's office, he races with the same woman to sign in first, only to have her called in first because her appointment was first and they changed their policy based on his suggestion. His finger is broken but his doctor refuses to help him until Larry pays his bill with his wife.
6	6	"The Wire"	Larry Charles	Larry David	November 19, 2000
To bury a telephone wire that's an eyesore in his backyard, Larry must befriend his next-door neighbors, the Weinstocks (Wayne Federman, Lucy Webb), who ask to meet Julia Louis-Dreyfus. Larry regards the request unreasonable, but he arranges for them to meet briefly, which the neighbor is dissatisfied by.
7	7	"AAMCO"	Robert B. Weide	Larry David	November 26, 2000
Jeff is disappointed with Larry for not congratulating him on buying his new car. Larry test drives it with Jeff and mistakes the trademark double-horn sound-effect in an AAMCO radio commercial for the real horn of the car behind them. This angers the driver behind Larry, who deliberately rams Jeff's car, causing it to need repairs by a specialist (Mike Hagerty), whom they meet at a dinner party which Cheryl hosts. After the guests leave, Larry tells her that he is disappointed that none of the guests were Jewish. The couple are angry with the caterer for taking away a large amount of uneaten food which they have paid her for. Larry retrieves some of it from her, which he gives to a homeless man.
8	8	"Beloved Aunt"	Robert B. Weide	Larry David	December 3, 2000
Cheryl's parents (Paul Dooley, Julie Payne) ask Larry to write a newspaper death notice for Cheryl's aunt, Louise. They blame him for a horrifying typographical error (cunt instead of aunt) when it is published in the local newspaper. Cheryl's sister Becky (Kaitlin Olson) and her boyfriend Craig fly in from Tallahassee, Florida. Craig tells Larry that he was about to break up with Becky when Louise died and asks Larry how long he should wait before doing so. Larry says to break up with her once they have returned home and not to tell anyone about their conversation. Craig ends the relationship while they are in Los Angeles. After Becky confronts Larry about him advising him to break up with her, Cheryl kicks him out of his own house. Larry goes to Jeff's house only to be ejected for accidentally touching Jeff's mother's left breast with the back of his hand. Larry tries to stay at a hotel, but is unable to because it is full. He confronts Craig in the lobby, is thrown out, and ends up sleeping in his car.
9	9	"Affirmative Action"	Bryan Gordon	Larry David	December 10, 2000
Larry offends Richard Lewis's African-American dermatologist by joking about affirmative action. After Larry accidentally gives Cheryl's rash prescription to a maître d', who throws it out, Larry and Cheryl travel across LA to retrieve a new one from Lewis's dermatologist. This goes awry when a houseguest calls Larry racist, so they resort to paging Cheryl's doctor on a Saturday.
10	10	"The Group"	Robert B. Weide	Larry David	December 17, 2000
Jeff offers Cheryl a role in The Vagina Monologues. Larry runs into an ex-girlfriend, Lucy, (Melanie Smith) who asks him to go to an incest survivors group with her. The members include the director of Cheryl's show, Gwendolyn (Laraine Newman). In order to fit in at the group, Larry falsely claims that when he was 12 he was sexually abused by his uncle Nathan and gives his name as Todd. When Gwendolyn meets Larry and Cheryl, she is puzzled to discover that his real name is Larry. Cheryl is suspicious of Larry for giving a woman a false name, so when they arrive home Larry tells Cheryl what happened at the group. When Gwendolyn meets Nathan, she shouts at him.

=== Season 2 (2001) ===
Larry David pursues a new television project, first with Jason Alexander, and then Julia Louis-Dreyfus after Jason offends him. Based on Alexander's frustration with his own post-Seinfeld career/life, the premise is about an actor who starred in a megahit sitcom who finds himself typecast. Larry pitches the idea to various networks, but eventually alienates or offends everyone he makes a deal with, and anyone else attached to the project.

No. overall	No. in season	Title	Directed by	Story by	Original release date
11	1	"The Car Salesman"	Robert B. Weide	Larry David	September 23, 2001
Larry experimentally takes a job as a car salesman, which Cheryl and his friends are puzzled by. He is fired after arguing with Richard at the dealership as he is trying to sell a car to someone. Larry and Jason Alexander contemplate making a new TV series about an actor who cannot find work because he is typecast as his character from a hit television sitcom.
12	2	"Thor"	Robert B. Weide	Larry David	September 30, 2001
Larry takes Jeff's clothes to him as he is staying at a hotel, having recently split from his wife Susie. Professional wrestler Thor Olson (Deron McBee) threatens Larry in response to a misunderstanding on the road. One of Larry's car tires is slashed soon after, which he assumes was done by Thor. Larry bumps into Thor's children and tells them wrestling is staged. At Larry's request, Jeff deflates one of the tires on Thor's car, and is caught doing so. Cheryl and her friend Wanda (Wanda Sykes) are angry with Larry for making a remark about Wanda's buttocks. Larry and Jason Alexander try to meet to discuss a proposed new show, but they argue about where they should have the meeting.
13	3	"Trick or Treat"	Larry Charles	Larry David	October 7, 2001
Larry refuses to give candy to two trick-or-treating girls on Halloween because they are not wearing costumes and he believes are too old. The girls toilet paper the Davids' trees and spray "Bald Asshole" across the front door. Cheryl blames Larry for not giving them candy. He calls the police, who are unhelpful and disagree with his description of the vandalism as a hate crime. The Davids have lunch with his wheelchair-user friend Cliff and his wife Shelley, during which Cliff falsely claims that his grandfather invented the Cobb salad. Larry jokingly suggests to Shelley that he would like to have sex with her; she takes the suggestion seriously and agrees. As the Davids are waiting in line for the premiere of Cliff's play, Larry is confronted by a Jewish man for whistling Richard Wagner's Siegfried Idyll, pointing out Wagner's antisemitism and accusing Larry of being a self-hating Jew. Larry tells Shelley and Cliff that he was joking about his sexual suggestion. Larry discovers that the Jewish man is the father of one of the girls. Larry hires an orchestra to play Wagner for Cheryl, then conducts the orchestra outside the man's house.
14	4	"The Shrimp Incident"	David Steinberg	Larry David	October 14, 2001
Julia Louis-Dreyfus and Larry pitch the show about a typecast actor to HBO, in which she will play the protagonist, Evelyn. At a Chinese restaurant, Larry and HBO executive Allan Wasserman's accidentally take each other's takeout orders. They return and exchange them, but shrimp are missing from Larry's food. Larry accuses Wasserman of stealing his shrimp, which he reacts to by deciding against commissioning the show. During a poker game, Larry calls one of the players, Michael Halbreicht, a cunt, for not playing his hand of ace high. Michael and a few of the other players are offended and walk off.
15	5	"The Thong"	Jeff Garlin	Larry David	October 21, 2001
Larry wants to discontinue his counseling when he sees his psychotherapist (John Pleshette) wearing a thong at the beach. Rob Reiner convinces Larry to be a celebrity lunch partner as a prize in a "Groat's syndrome" charity auction, but Larry offends the winner (Tom McGowan) in the restaurant with his poor conversation and by eating before the winner's food arrives.
16	6	"The Acupuncturist"	Bryan Gordon	Larry David	October 28, 2001
Larry lends $5,000 to an old friend, Barry Weiner, who says he will repay it when his father dies, as he feels he is owed an inheritance. When his father dies soon after, Larry is blamed for the death. Larry offers another $5,000 to his acupuncturist (Keone Young) if he can cure his neck problems. Larry's neck problem improves significantly but not completely, which leads to a dispute between the two men as to whether or not Larry owes him the money.
17	7	"The Doll"	Robert B. Weide	Larry David	November 4, 2001
Larry and Julia successfully pitch the show to ABC. Larry meets the executive Lane Michaelson's six-year-old daughter Tara, who asks him to cut her expensive doll Judy's hair shorter. Tara is initially pleased, until she realizes it will not grow. After her mother Anne confronts Larry, he and Jeff take the same type of doll's head from Jeff's daughter Sammi's collection to give to Anne. As Susie walks in, Larry conceals the doll head in his pants, and Jeff claims that they are there to fix a shelf in the room, which Susie does not believe. Sammi is upset when she finds the doll's head is missing. Susie confronts Jeff and Larry and demands it be returned. Larry gets the short-haired doll head from Anne, which he gives to Susie. She is angry when she finds out that the hair has been cut. Inside the theater bathroom, Larry puts a water bottle down his pants to cool his groin, which itches due to an allergic reaction to the doll head. Tara hugs him and starts an uproar in the lobby about him being in the women's bathroom and having something hard in his pants, so he escapes out of a window.
18	8	"Shaq"	Dean Parisot	Larry David	November 11, 2001
Larry is annoyed by his acquaintances asking him for favors and by Cheryl's parents, who are staying at the Davids' house. He accidentally trips and injures Shaquille O'Neal at a Lakers basketball game, which makes Larry even more unpopular than usual, to Larry's delight. However, it has apparently given him good luck. He is pleased at Cheryl's parents leaving and him being no longer asked for favors. After apologizing successfully to Shaq, Larry's luck turns bad again. Dr. Craig Wiggins, the Lakers' professional team doctor (Joel McKinnon Miller), refuses to check a worrying spot on Larry's neck.
19	9	"The Baptism"	Keith Truesdell	Larry David	November 18, 2001
Larry and Cheryl have problems as they travel to attend Becky's Jewish fiancé's (Mitchell Whitfield) baptism in Monterey, due to Larry misplacing their plane tickets, which Larry accuses two other men in LAX of stealing. Larry interrupts the baptism in a river, thinking that he is being drowned. The fiancé decides to not be baptized and to remain Jewish. Becky cancels their wedding rather than marry someone who does not share her religion. Richard accuses Larry of stealing his outgoing answering machine greeting. After the Davids return from Monterey, a homeless man whom Larry donated his jacket to gives him their plane tickets, which he found in its pocket.
20	10	"The Massage"	Robert B. Weide	Larry David	November 25, 2001
In the street, Larry walks past a restaurant manager, who is annoyed at Larry not stopping to chat. Larry and Julia make a final attempt to pitch the show with CBS. Larry and Cheryl dine at a restaurant, which is managed by the man he walked past earlier, who gives him the cold shoulder. He has his staff phone the police when Larry tries to take a fork and napkin to his chauffeur (Tom Booker). Larry receives a massage from Jeff's masseuse (Kathleen York), during which she gives him a handjob; he tells her to stop when he realizes what she is doing. Cheryl is told by a psychic that Larry is having an affair with a woman who fits the masseuse's description: long red hair and a star tattoo. Though Cheryl's psychic has a record of extraordinary accuracy, Larry persuades Cheryl he is not having an affair. Larry is convicted of stealing the fork and his sentence is to wear a sandwich board stating "I steal forks from restaurants" while standing outside the restaurant. The couple encounter the masseuse outside the restaurant. When the masseuse recognizes Larry, Cheryl describes her tattoo without seeing it and thinks she is Larry's lover. Larry has to greet all the network executives while wearing the sandwich board as they go in the restaurant, including those from CBS, ruining his last chance of doing the show.

=== Season 3 (2002) ===
No. overall	No. in season	Title	Directed by	Story by	Original release date	Viewers (millions)
21	1	"Chet's Shirt"	Robert B. Weide	Larry David	September 15, 2002	5.53
22	2	"The Benadryl Brownie"	Larry Charles	Larry David	September 22, 2002	4.55
23	3	"Club Soda and Salt"	Robert B. Weide	Larry David	September 29, 2002	3.84
24	4	"The Nanny from Hell"	Larry Charles	Larry David	October 6, 2002	4.55
25	5	"The Terrorist Attack"	Robert B. Weide	Larry David	October 13, 2002	4.43
26	6	"The Special Section"	Bryan Gordon	Larry David	October 20, 2002	4.02
27	7	"The Corpse-Sniffing Dog"	Andy Ackerman	Larry David	October 27, 2002	3.82
28	8	"Krazee-Eyez Killa"	Robert B. Weide	Larry David	November 3, 2002	4.59
29	9	"Mary, Joseph and Larry"	David Steinberg	Larry David	November 10, 2002	4.81
30	10	"The Grand Opening"	Robert B. Weide	Larry David	November 17, 2002	4.73

=== Season 4 (2004) ===
Larry works with Mel Brooks, Ben Stiller, Cady Huffman and David Schwimmer to star on Broadway in The Producers. Larry struggles to fulfill his wife's tenth anniversary present to him—a one-time-only act of adultery.

No. overall	No. in season	Title	Directed by	Story by	Original release date
31	1	"Mel's Offer"	Larry Charles	Larry David	January 4, 2004
Mel Brooks gives Larry and Ben Stiller the lead roles as Max Bialystock and Leopold Bloom in his musical The Producers, despite being advised that Larry is not a good fit for it. Larry reminds Cheryl she promised him ten years earlier that he could have sex with another woman one time in order to encourage him to marry her. Though Larry never expected Cheryl to keep this promise, she challenges him to go ahead with it. Mel accidentally hits Larry with a door, slightly injuring his head. Larry sees a doctor about the injury, and argues with him.
32	2	"Ben's Birthday Party"	Robert B. Weide	Larry David	January 11, 2004
Larry meets the show's blind piano player Michael, who he and Richard helped move in 2000. Michael has a below-average-looking girlfriend who has tricked him into believing she is a beautiful model. Michael asks Larry if he thinks she is beautiful, to which he says she is not. Michael breaks up with her, but blames Larry for the breakup and guilts him into helping with several tasks. At Ben Stiller's birthday party, Larry angers Susie by saying "I love tits" during a game of telephone with children, though Larry insists he was accurately repeating what the previous boy in the chain said. Ben is perturbed that Larry did not bring a gift (despite him telling attendees not to bring gifts) and that he refuses to sing "Happy Birthday to You". While demonstrating a golf swing, Larry accidentally stabs Ben in the eye with a wooden skewer. Richard's friend's attractive daughter, Kim, shows Larry her new breast implants by placing his hands on them. Cheryl sees Larry and Kim through a window and angrily tells Larry that he has used up his anniversary gift. At a bar, Michael plays the piano as he sings very badly. Everyone leaves, except Larry.
33	3	"The Blind Date"	Larry Charles	Larry David	January 18, 2004
After Larry angers Ben by insisting on sitting in the back seat of Ben's car, Ben quits the musical and is replaced with David Schwimmer. Larry is annoyed that Cheryl's teenage cousin Stewart (Anton Yelchin) is staying with them for a few days. He performs a card trick but will not tell Larry how it is done, though a mentally disabled man figures it out. Larry has Cheryl's car washed by four mentally disabled men, one of whom steals his sunblock. The car runs out of gas and Larry meets a veiled Muslim woman, Haboos (Moon Zappa), whom Larry fixes up with Michael. Larry accidentally lifts off her veil when he opens his umbrella; Haboos is mortified and goes in her house, while Michael is despondent that she no longer fits his wish for a woman who no other man could see. Jeff tells Larry that Cheryl entered his sexual fantasy about Jenna Jameson, which angers Larry. After seeing Cheryl and Susie wearing sexy outfits before going to a costume party, Larry makes Cheryl wear Haboos' burqa instead. Larry is disturbed when Susie appears in his sexual fantasy about Cady Huffman, who plays Ulla in the musical.
34	4	"The Weatherman"	Robert B. Weide	Larry David	January 25, 2004
Larry and Cheryl attend a dinner party at the Greenes. Sammi is disgusted when she sees a hideous photograph of Larry's tooth. Larry falls into the toilet bowl, injuring his back. A television meteorologist's wrong forecast of rain angers Larry, who accuses the weatherman of falsely predicting rain in order to clear the golf course for himself. Larry attends a testimonial for Marty Funkhouser's father Leo, where he argues with a couple and incurs the other attendees' wrath when his injured back prevents him from participating in a standing ovation. Larry sets a golf date on the weatherman's next forecast of rain in order to benefit from the absence of other golfers, but this time the prediction is accurate.
35	5	"The 5 Wood"	Bryan Gordon	Larry David	February 1, 2004
Larry faces termination from his country club because of his messy locker. He makes plans for an encounter with his dentist's assistant. Larry complains to David that there are too few cashews in his father's raisin and cashew snack. At Leo's funeral, Larry recognizes his 5-wood golf club in the dead man's hand and secretly swaps it for Jeff's club. At the service, Marty notices the different club and knows who is responsible, because Larry accidentally dropped a cashew in the casket and Jeff's club bears his name. The memberships of both men and their wives are canceled, which Cheryl and Susie berate their husbands about. Jeff and Susie's dog, Oscar, bites Larry's penis, causing Larry to cancel his date with the assistant. Larry and Cheryl interview at a country club, pretending to be conservatives to gain favor.
36	6	"The Car Pool Lane"	Robert B. Weide	Larry David	February 8, 2004
Larry and Jeff want to go to a Dodgers game but cannot get tickets. Marty Funkhouser refuses to give Larry his recently deceased father's ticket. Cheryl surprises Larry with two tickets. To avoid jury duty, during voir dire Larry claims he cannot be impartial due to the defendant being black. Larry buys marijuana from a street dealer for his father, who has glaucoma. Larry calls Jeff to invite him to the game but Jeff decides not to go. Larry is approached by a street prostitute, Monena (Kym Whitley), and hires her to be a passenger in his car so that he can legally use the car pool lane in order to get to Dodger Stadium on time. At the stadium, Larry sees Marty in a field-level seat and asks to sit in the empty seat next to him, but Marty refuses, saying the seat is meant for his father in observance of their tradition. Two men from the country club that the Davids want to join see him sitting next to Monena. Marty's car will not start, so he asks Larry to take him to the airport. While there, Marty is holding Larry's jacket when a police sniffer dog smells the marijuana, and Marty is arrested. Monena offers Larry some potent marijuana; they visit Larry's father and smoke it with him. Larry hallucinates in the bathroom mirror that he is being berated by his body over his health and laziness. Larry tells Monena he cannot pay her the full amount. While at the courthouse for Marty's trial to speak on his behalf, Larry is confronted by Monena, who demands the money that he owes her. Cheryl is disgusted at how she believes Larry has spent his anniversary present. Larry discovers that the judge is the same one who presided over his attempt to avoid jury duty, and has Monena pose as his girlfriend in order to clear Marty's name. Unused footage of Dodger Stadium was used to exonerate Juan Catalan from a charge of murder by the district attorney by giving him an alibi during the time the murder was committed. A short Netflix documentary, Long Shot, was made about the incident.
37	7	"The Surrogate"	Larry Charles	Larry David	February 22, 2004
Larry and Cheryl are annoyed that their friend Marilyn phones after every night's syndicated episode of Seinfeld. At the doctor's office, Larry complains about the outdated magazines in the waiting room. Larry fails a medical test when his heart rate jumps after looking at an attractive nurse, so he must wear a heart monitor for the next 24 hours. Richard is dating a black woman but feels intimidated and asks Larry to find if there is any truth to the rumor that black men have very large penises. Wanda berates Larry when he mistakes a black driver for a valet and angrily refuses to answer Larry's question about Richard's concern. Larry goes to a baby shower, where he gives a mulatto doll to a couple who have hired a surrogate mother. He also gives a present to the surrogate and inadvertently convinces her to keep the baby. While leaving a voicemail for David's father, a car collides into Larry's, causing him to mistakenly leave a profane message. When the enraged driver threatens Larry with a tire iron, Larry uses his heart monitor to fake a heart attack, and an ambulance takes him to the hospital. A biracial nurse answers Larry's question about black men. While Larry and Richard are at urinals, they meet Muggsy Bogues but Larry is caught looking at Bogues' genitals. The surrogate changes her mind and gives the baby to the couple. David's father returns an angry message for Larry.
38	8	"Wandering Bear"	Robert B. Weide	Larry David	February 29, 2004
Larry and Jeff want a Girls Gone Wild video, so Larry orders it to be delivered to his office. At Larry's office, his assistant Antoinette is upset and unstable because she recently broke up with her boyfriend. She is also angry with Larry for the videotape that has arrived for him. Larry and Jeff watch the tape at Jeff's house. Larry leaves to swap his glasses for the ones in his car and accidentally lets Oscar out of the house. While searching for Oscar, Larry hits Oscar with his car. Jeff and Larry initially believe that Oscar was not hurt but he soon becomes ill, so Susie takes him to the veterinary and accuses Larry of taking revenge on the dog for biting him. Cheryl is pressuring Larry to have sex again now that his penis is healed, so Jeff gives Larry condoms which have a numbing agent lidocaine on the inside. Larry accidentally puts it on inside out, numbing Cheryl's vagina. Larry is recommended a herbal remedy for Cheryl by an American Indian gardener named Wandering Bear. The remedy proves to be effective. Antoinette forgets some of her duties, and then abruptly quits, and threatens to tell the world Larry's many secrets. To get her back, Larry meets with her boyfriend Marvin to try to reunite the couple. Marvin tells Larry that he ejaculates prematurely, so he gives Marvin an Everlast condom. Wandering Bear demands money owed to him by the Greenes, but Susie refuses to pay it and tells him to leave. Wandering Bear performs an Indian ritual on Oscar and the listless dog suddenly springs back to life and chases Larry out of the house.
39	9	"The Survivor"	Larry Charles	Larry David	March 7, 2004
Larry asks his rabbi for advice about his plan to have sex with another woman. The rabbi assures him the practice has precedent in the Torah, Sarah having allowed her husband Abraham to have sex with Hagar. Larry and Cheryl plan to celebrate their 10th anniversary with a vow renewal. Due to a misunderstanding, the same rabbi, who is conducting the ceremony, brings a "survivor" (Survivor: The Australian Outback runner-up, Colby Donaldson) to a social occasion and Larry's father brings a Holocaust survivor, Solly. This leads to an argument between Colby and Solly over who has endured the most. Larry receives an offer of sex from Hasidic dry cleaner Anna (Gina Gershon), who has also been married ten years. They meet at a hotel room, where Larry appears wrapped in a sheet with a hole in it, believing a rumor about how Hasidic people have sex, until she corrects him. Before they can have sex, an earthquake strikes and the hotel is evacuated.
40	10	"Opening Night"	Robert B. Weide	Larry David	March 14, 2004
Cheryl reminds Larry to cash in on his present while in New York, as the deadline is approaching. She suspects that he will try to have sex with Cady. The cast members of the musical fly to New York, and Larry suspects David of having snitched on him to the flight attendant. At the hotel, Larry is annoyed by having to tip several hotel staff members. David loses his watch and Larry finds it at the hotel. Larry then loses it and David demands to be reimbursed. Larry finds the watch on hotel repairman Sanjay's wrist and takes it from him, then gives it to David. Intending to help Larry hook-up with Cady, Jeff tells him she has OCD, so he claims to her that he also suffers from the condition. She invites Larry into her dressing room for sex, but he loses interest after seeing a photograph of President George W. Bush on her dressing table. In the line outside the theater, Larry argues with a man (Stephen Colbert) who asks Larry to take his picture. The man curses Larry to have a bad performance on opening night. When Larry forgets his lines during the performance, Mel Brooks and his wife Anne Bancroft walk out, delighted because they wanted the play to bomb. He chose Larry because he believed that he would cause the play to be terminated, freeing Mel from all of the travel and bother that the play has cost him. But Larry rebounds by improvising a stand-up routine, which draws laughter from the audience and gives him the chance to remember his lines. The production is a success, horrifying Mel. Jerry Seinfeld has a cameo in the audience.

=== Season 5 (2005) ===
Larry's friend Richard needs a kidney transplant operation. Under pressure from his friends and family, Larry offers to donate his own kidney to Richard. Larry then makes concerted efforts to find Richard another kidney donor. Larry thinks that he may have been adopted, because of a potentially misunderstood word his father said (and subsequently denies) while in the hospital, and hires a private investigator (Mekhi Phifer) to look into it.

No. overall	No. in season	Title	Directed by	Story by	Original release date
41	1	"The Larry David Sandwich"	Robert B. Weide	Larry David	September 25, 2005
Larry nearly drowns while swimming alone in the sea, and becomes convinced divine intervention saved him. He is initially excited when Jeff tells him that Leo's delicatessen has named a sandwich after him, but is upset after hearing the sandwich's unappetizing contents. Cheryl is annoyed with Larry for taking a phone call from Jeff during intercourse with her. Larry and his father Nat go to Leo's; Nat orders and enjoys Larry's sandwich but suffers a stroke. Larry blames the sandwich's contents for the stroke. At the hospital, Nat mumbles what sounds like "You're adopted", both shocking and elating Larry, but Nat denies having said that once he is recovered. Larry attempts to get Ted Danson, who also has a Leo's sandwich named after him, to switch sandwiches. Danson agrees until Jeff tells him what is in Larry's sandwich. Larry writes a letter to his former nanny, Johanna Seiderman, who he believes may know if he is adopted. The Deli owner (who is adopted) hears that Larry is adopted and lets him put his name on any sandwich on the menu. Larry chooses Ted Danson's. A care worker at Seiderman's nursing home phones Larry during sex with Cheryl, but this time he does not take it. Seiderman tells the worker that she had the answer to his question, then immediately dies.
42	2	"The Bowtie"	Larry Charles	Larry David	October 2, 2005
Larry hires a private investigator to find out if he is adopted. He is reluctant to take the case, but does so for a higher fee. Larry wonders whether he is a Muslim. He later finds out that he is when he walks in on him while he is praying. Larry is delighted at being popular with lesbians. However, he is pleased when Marty Funkhouser tells him that his previously lesbian daughter, Jodi, has started a relationship with a man. Larry's elation at this causes him to be shunned by lesbians. Larry tells Jodi's boyfriend lesbians are better at pleasuring women than men are because of their experience from masturbating, damaging his sexual confidence. The couple split, and she returns to a relationship with a woman. As a result, Larry's popularity with lesbians is restored. Larry adopts a dog, Sheriff, from the animal shelter. When Wanda visits, she thinks it is racist because it barks at her and a black man. However, it later barks at Rosie O'Donnell (who is white) and is stroked by the PI without barking.
43	3	"The Christ Nail"	Robert B. Weide	Larry David	October 9, 2005
Larry is pleased with his new shoe inserts, but his acquaintances are annoyed by the loud squeaking noises when he walks with them. Larry's handyman Jesús—who is Larry and Cheryl's housekeeper Maria's husband—complains of pain in the soles of his feet, so Larry gives him some of his shoe inserts. Cheryl is annoyed at Larry looking at her bra. Cheryl wants to fire Maria because she does not wear a bra. Larry tells her that she should wear a bra, and buys her a few bras of different sizes, because he does not know what size she is. Larry looks at Susie's bra for comparison. She is angry when she sees him doing so on one of their CCTV cameras, which Jeff and Susie had installed because they suspect their maid of stealing from them. Larry's father-in-law wears a nail used in The Passion of the Christ around his neck. Larry tells him that worshiping a man is gay, and that if God had a daughter, more people would be Christians. Angered by Larry's gifting Maria a bra, Jesús quits without attaching a mezuzah to the door jamb. Larry puts it up quickly to please his father, who is about to visit, using the Christ nail to hammer it in place. Larry is puzzled by 11-year-old Sammi believing in the tooth fairy. She discovers the fairy does not exist when she sees Susie trying to put money under her pillow, having been woken by squeaking from Larry's shoes. Still angry about the bra, Jesús chases Larry with a cross-shaped club, but collapses in agony when he steps on the Christ nail, which had been dropped on the floor.
44	4	"Kamikaze Bingo"	Robert B. Weide	Larry David	October 16, 2005
Larry meets Yoshi, an art dealer, at a Japanese restaurant. His father is in the same nursing home as Larry's father Nat. Larry is puzzled when Yoshi says that his father was a kamikaze pilot in World War II, to which the dealer says that he grazed the target ship. Yoshi feels dishonored by Larry implying that his father is a coward, and attempts suicide. Larry is confused when Nat's doctor and pharmacist disagree as to which medication is best suited to Nat. Larry accuses one of the home's residents, Ruth, of fixing bingo so that she wins.
45	5	"Lewis Needs a Kidney"	Robert B. Weide	Larry David	October 30, 2005
Larry locks himself out of his car. He calls Jeff to collect him. While waiting for him, a drive-through restaurant refuses to serve Larry due to him not being in a car. A motorist, Peter Hagen, who is waiting in line, invites Larry into his car so that he can buy food. Jeff arrives and joins them in the car. The next day, Larry and Jeff are called to the police station to provide Peter an alibi. Richard needs a kidney transplant; Larry and Jeff debate whether or not to offer him a kidney of theirs. They take a test which shows they are compatible to donate to Richard. Susie forbids Jeff to donate his, so Larry is set to. Larry watches a TV news report in which it is stated that Richard's cousin Louis has been shot during a robbery and is in a coma, not expected to survive. Larry is delighted at the prospect of Louis becoming the kidney donor. Peter is arrested for the crime.
46	6	"The Smoking Jacket"	David Steinberg	Larry David	November 6, 2005
Larry frequently visits Louis at the hospital, hoping he will die soon and donate his kidney to Richard. Nat sends Larry's cousin Andy his smoking jacket. Thinking his increasingly senile father meant to give the jacket to him, Larry negotiates for the jacket in exchange for bringing Andy on his visit to Hugh Hefner's Playboy Mansion. He also brings along a terminally ill young boy who caught him fiddling with the wires to Louis's life support and blackmailed him. However, he fails to fulfill the boy's wish to see a naked woman because the girls at the Playboy Mansion are more prudish than Larry thought, covering up their private parts and running away screaming the instant they spot a male in the pool area. While there, Larry lets Hugh Hefner try on his smoking jacket. Hefner wears it during a long bathroom trip, so Larry swaps it with Hefner's own smoking jacket when no one is looking. While looking for another way to fulfill the terminal boy's wish, Larry accidentally walks in on Andy having sex with a Playboy model, to the boy's delight. Nat complains that his smoking jacket has been stolen, having forgotten that he mailed it to Andy. Larry gives him Hefner's, but he recognizes it is different, and demands his real jacket back. Larry calls in his favor for showing the boy a naked woman, and the boy asks the Make-A-Wish Foundation for Hefner's smoking jacket.
47	7	"The Seder"	Robert B. Weide	Larry David	November 13, 2005
Larry is annoyed at his newspaper having been stolen from his front yard every day for a week. He and Cheryl hold a Passover Seder for friends and family. Larry is approached in the street by a man, whom he is initially cold towards because he recognizes him as Rick Leftowitz (Rob Corddry), the convicted sex offender who has recently moved into the neighborhood. When Rick tells him that he loves Seinfeld and golf and is Jewish, he warms to Rick. Following the Biblical law concerning Passover for small families, he invites Rick to the Seder, which infuriates Cheryl and Susie. Larry accuses another guest, a cosmetic surgeon named Mark, of stealing his paper. Mark leaves early due to being paged by his hospital to attend an emergency.
48	8	"The Ski Lift"	Larry Charles	Larry David	November 20, 2005
Richard's nurse Lisa tells Larry that she dated Jeff and that he has a small penis. Jeff tells Larry she is lying and that the truth is her vagina is massive. Larry finds out that the head of the kidney transplant consortium is Ben Heineman, an Orthodox Jew. He deliberately crashes into Ben's parked car in order to have a reason to approach him. In an attempt to get Richard Lewis to the top of the hospital waiting list, Jeff and Susie invite Larry, Cheryl, Ben, and Ben's daughter Rachel to spend the weekend at their ski lodge. Larry suggests he give Richard's baseball to Ben to accelerate the friendship, but the baseball is missing. Since Richard has only had close friends visit and Lisa's nurse outfit has no place where she could conceal such a large object, Larry suspects Lisa stole it by hiding it in her unusually large vagina. During the weekend, Ben offers to put Richard's name at the top of the kidney transplant list, and encourages Rachel to go back down the mountain with Larry while he returns to the lodge. The ski lift that Larry and Rachel are on becomes stuck. Her religion forbids a single woman from being alone with a man after sunset, so she jumps off. Larry uses Rachel's phone to call Richard to let him know the scheme has failed and ask if he has seen his phone. He tells Richard he will call his phone. A moment later, Richard hears Larry's ringtone coming from Lisa and suspects she put it inside her vagina.
49	9	"The Korean Bookie"	Bryan Gordon	Larry David	November 27, 2005
Having paid Ben $1,500 for the car he damaged, Larry is angry when he discovers that Ben gave the money to Rachel, who used it to pay for breast augmentation. Larry is also angry with a woman for borrowing his jacket without asking him and accidentally staining it. She gives him $150 to replace it. Oscar goes missing and he suspects his Korean bookmaker of killing him and serving him to attendees of the wedding of a couple who are Cheryl's friends. Larry tells them all that they are eating a dog, but later that day he sees Oscar.
50	10	"The End"	Larry Charles	Larry David	December 4, 2005
Larry has a change of attitude as a result of being told by the PI that he is adopted. He travels to Bisbee, Arizona, to meet his birth parents, who are a patient and loving Christian couple. He becomes a Christian and tells Cheryl that he wants to have children with her. He donates his kidney to Richard. Despite this, Richard refuses to lend Larry his new golf club. On the way to the operating room, the PI tells Larry that he was mistaken in his belief that he is adopted. This makes Larry change his mind about the kidney, but the surgeons refuse to abort the procedure. Larry dies and goes to Heaven, where he meets his mother (Bea Arthur), recovers a full head of hair, argues with two attendants (Dustin Hoffman and Sacha Baron Cohen), and is sent back into his body, waking up in his hospital bed.

=== Season 6 (2007) ===
Cheryl and Larry shelter a New Orleans family named the Blacks (Vivica A. Fox, J. B. Smoove and Ellia English), who move into their house after a hurricane destroyed the Blacks' home. A distracted phone call between Larry and Cheryl causes her to re-evaluate their marriage dynamic and leave him; Larry thus returns to the dating scene.

Guest stars include: Steve Coogan, Michael McKean, Lucy Lawless, Tim Meadows, Mayim Bialik, Gina Gershon, John McEnroe, Barbara Boxer, John Legend, Diedrich Bader, and Ken Jeong.

No. overall	No. in season	Title	Directed by	Story by	Original release date
51	1	"Meet the Blacks"	Larry Charles	Larry David	September 9, 2007
Larry excuses himself for missing Marty's party by showing up the day after, pretending he got the date wrong. Jeff copies the idea, leading Marty to rope them both into an impromptu house party. Larry, Jeff, Marty and their wives play The Newlywed Game, during which Cheryl is angry with Larry for saying that he wants to have sex with Richard's girlfriend Cha Cha (Tia Carrere). Cheryl uses this anger as leverage to pressure Larry into taking in the Blacks, a black New Orleans family displaced by a hurricane. Larry is angry with Marty for serving cake from an erotic bakery that is shaped like male genitals at the house party. He neglects to tell this to Jeff, who ignorantly orders the same cake and opens it up in front of the horrified Black children. Larry discards one of Loretta Black's cigarettes in the trash, which ultimately burns the Davids' house down.
52	2	"The Anonymous Donor"	Robert B. Weide	Larry David	September 16, 2007
The Davids and Blacks move into a new house. Larry has a wing of a museum named after him but is upstaged by an anonymous donor, whom he discovers is Ted Danson. Larry is annoyed by Loretta Black inviting her brother Leon – who already lives in LA – to live with them. Cheryl tells Larry that she found a semen stain on a bedsheet, blaming Leon, but later finds out it was actually Jeff. As a result, Cheryl bans Jeff from their house. In retaliation, Susie imposes a similar ban on Larry. Larry takes the bedsheet to dry cleaner Anna but complains to her as his Joe Pepitone Yankees jersey was inadvertently collected by another one of her customers, from whom Leon later retrieves it. Susie accuses Larry of masturbating on Sammi's stuffed animal. Thinking they are talking about who donated the museum wing, Cheryl tells Susie that Ted Danson did it.
53	3	"The Ida Funkhouser Roadside Memorial"	David Mandel	Larry David	September 23, 2007
Marty gives Larry a $50 bill that he was carrying around in his shoe to repay a debt, which Larry is then unable to unload as no business is willing to accept it. The Davids try to get Loretta's kids into an exclusive school with Sammi. Larry offends the headmistress of the school when he stands behind her in an ice cream line and criticizes her for sampling every single flavor. To smooth things over and not scuttle the admission chances for Loretta's kids, Larry gives flowers to the headmistress, which were taken from a roadside memorial for Marty's mother Ida, who was recently killed in a road accident.
54	4	"The Lefty Call"	Alec Berg	Larry David	September 30, 2007
Larry regrets giving Richard Lewis' girlfriend Cha Cha a job near the office bathroom because she talks to him too much and tells people how often he uses the bathroom. A waiter refuses to let Susie take a doggy bag if she is going to give the leftover food to her dog, so Larry says that he will eat the doggy bag's contents. Not believing him, the waiter spikes the food with laxatives which makes the dog ill. Larry proves inept at using his left hand to hold his phone, causing a misunderstanding with Cha Cha.
55	5	"The Freak Book"	Bryan Gordon	Larry David	October 7, 2007
Cheryl arranges for her, Larry, Jeff, Susie, Ted Danson and Mary Steenburgen to have burial plots next to each other. Larry attends Ted's birthday party but is bothered by Ted requiring the waiters wear bow ties and by his chauffeur, Charlie, having to wait outside. Larry gives Ted a coffee table book about freaks. Charlie is drunk and gropes Mary, so Ted throws him and Larry out and rejects the book. Larry pretends to be Charlie and covers his limo driving shift, driving John McEnroe - who quickly becomes annoyed by Larry asking him many personal questions. Things go from bad to worse when Larry stops by the cemetery asking that his burial plot be moved far away from Ted Danson.
56	6	"The Rat Dog"	David Steinberg	Larry David	October 14, 2007
Larry offends a deaf woman by telling her that her dog looks similar to a rat. Two other men mistakenly assume it to be a rat, one of whom stamps on it several times. Larry accidentally insults her husband, Hal, while drying his hands with a hand dryer, by unwittingly signing the insult cocksucker. Larry ruins Leon and Loretta's respective job chances via accidentally swapping cellphones with Leon and a slow toaster. A 'massage-with-happy-ending' gift to Nat causes Nat to think that she was giving him special treatment when she actually does that as standard.
57	7	"The TiVo Guy"	Jeff Schaffer	Larry David	October 21, 2007
While on a flight that encounters a storm, Cheryl calls Larry, who has the TiVo guy (Kevin Heffernan) over, to make some last requests in case of a fatal crash. Unable to hear her due to the storm interference, Larry asks her to call him back. Considering this insensitive, Cheryl leaves Larry. Their mutual friends must choose sides—nearly all of Larry's friends choose Cheryl. Larry is angry with a man whom he lent $10,000 to when he discovers that he is having a lavish party. Larry is pleasantly surprised when Lucy Lawless accepts his offer of a dinner date, but the restaurateur tells him that he will not be giving them a table because his restaurant is siding with Cheryl. Lucy suggests that they instead go to her place, but angrily walks off when Larry misinterprets this as an offer of sex.
58	8	"The N Word"	Tom Kramer	Larry David	October 28, 2007
Larry offends the Blacks' Auntie Rae when he gets an erection during a hug; he tells the Blacks that a five-second hug with a woman typically causes such a response in him. Larry tells Jeff that he is discriminated against for being bald. Larry starts dating a doctor at the hospital named Sheila Flomm. At lunch with her, he overhears a man say "nigger" in the hospital bathroom. When Larry relays the story to Sheila, he is accused of racism by an African-American doctor, who is on his way to operate on Jeff to stop his snoring. Offended and distracted, the doctor shaves Jeff bald by mistake and does not perform the operation. When Susie gets angry at Larry for saying "nigger" in front of the doctor, Larry tells the story, which is overheard by the Blacks, who shout at him and move out of Larry's house to stay with the Greenes. The Blacks move back in because of Jeff's snoring. Jeff believes he is being discriminated against for being bald, so he takes the doctor to court for medical malpractice, where Larry refuses to recount the events in front of African Americans present in the room. Brenda Strong, Ben Stiller, and Phil LaMarr guest-star.
59	9	"The Therapists"	David Mandel	Larry David	November 4, 2007
Larry tries to win Cheryl back by reinventing himself as a person. However, he alienates her by following his therapist Dr. Bright's (Steve Coogan) advice to give her an ultimatum to move back in with him. Larry gets Bright to admit to advising the ultimatum, but a continuing problem is that Cheryl will not take any forward steps in her relationship with Larry without her therapist Dr. Slavin's approval. He curries favor with Slavin by saving her from a staged mugging by Bright. Bright is arrested, and Slavin, having fallen in love with Larry, advises Cheryl not to see him any more. Larry claims to have early stage Alzheimer's, which persuades Slavin to give up her crush on Larry and tell Cheryl to date him again, and allows him to claim he cannot remember what the mugger looked like, killing the case against Bright. After being released, Bright becomes a patient of Slavin and talks to her about the staged mugging. Slavin passes his story on to Cheryl.
60	10	"The Bat Mitzvah"	Larry Charles	Larry David	November 11, 2007
Larry "recommends" a former but much-despised Seinfeld director (Michael McKean) to helm Richard Lewis' new TV pilot. Larry meets a potential love interest while waiting to see a gastroenterologist, and then later gives a sarcastic symptom to the nurse about his ailment in the exam room. Larry chooses to imitate a man he saw at the movies cutting the line in order to keep the office across from his vacant. At Sammi's Bat Mitzvah ceremony, Larry gives a toast, which quickly turns in rumour quashing about a gerbil lodged in his rectum. Larry and Loretta become attracted to each other.

=== Season 7 (2009) ===
Larry and Loretta are in a relationship, which Larry soon realizes is not working for him. She is diagnosed with cancer and breaks up with Larry because she thinks he is cheating on her. She and the rest of the family leave Larry's home—except for Leon, who stays with him. When Larry runs into Cheryl for the first time since last season, he learns that she appreciated him more when he had a job, so he accepts NBC's offer for a Seinfeld reunion show to give her a part in it and win her back.

Guest stars include: Jason Alexander, Eric Andre, Jillian Bell, Wayne Federman, Philip Baker Hall, Richard Kind, Julia Louis-Dreyfus, Rosie O'Donnell, Catherine O'Hara, Randall Park, Michael Richards, Meg Ryan, Jerry Seinfeld, Elisabeth Shue, Christian Slater, and David Spade.

No. overall	No. in season	Title	Directed by	Story by	Original release date	U.S. viewers (millions)
61	1	"Funkhouser's Crazy Sister"	Larry Charles	Larry David	September 20, 2009	1.10
Cheryl tells Larry that she preferred life with him when he was working, because she only had him in her life part-time. With Loretta sick and awaiting the results of a biopsy, Larry is tired of looking after her and attempts to break up with her before the results arrive. Larry is horrified when her doctor tells him that she has cancer and will take two to four years to recover, during which she will need a lot of looking after. Jeff has sex with Marty Funkhouser's mentally unstable sister, Bam Bam (Catherine O'Hara).
62	2	"Vehicular Fellatio"	Alec Berg	Larry David	September 27, 2009	1.05
Larry is increasingly unhappy with Loretta's demands on him. He arranges an appointment for both of them with a doctor who is renowned for encouraging cancer patients to remove themselves from bad relationships, so that Loretta will leave Larry. To increase the chance of that, he deliberately does several annoying things during the consultation. Loretta decides not to see the doctor again because she thinks she sees her giving her husband a blowjob as he is driving. Larry refuses contact with Richard's new girlfriend because Jeff told him she recently gave Richard a blowjob in the car. Jeff crashes his car while receiving a blowjob from Susie. Leon is enjoying an affair with his friend's wife. When the friend comes to the house, Larry helps her hide from him in his car. Loretta sees this, and wrongly assumes that she is giving Larry a blowjob. Larry does not try to correct her, as she ends their relationship due to assuming he is cheating on her and the Blacks move out. However, Leon stays, which Larry is puzzled and disappointed about.
63	3	"The Reunion"	Jeff Schaffer	Larry David	October 4, 2009	1.56
After years of resistance, Larry agrees to do a Seinfeld reunion special when he realizes that giving Cheryl a major role as George Costanza's ex-wife might make her decide to return to him. As a thank you from NBC for Larry agreeing to do the reunion special, he and Jeff get tickets to a sold out Lakers game, only to find those seats nowhere near courtside. Larry identifies that Susie has Lyme disease and tells her that she is ungrateful to him for saving her life.
64	4	"The Hot Towel"	Alec Berg	Larry David	October 11, 2009	1.19
Larry suffers a burn to his hand when handed a hot towel on a plane, leading to a visit to Dr. Morrison (Philip Baker Hall). Larry learns Dr. Morrison lives near him and manages to get his phone number, but tells Larry to use his notification service phone number in case of any issues. At Ted Danson and Mary Steenburgen's anniversary party, Larry finds Christian Slater eating up large quantities of caviar and relays the information to Mary, angering Slater. Jeff and Susie's daughter Sammi performs "Can't Take My Eyes Off You" as an anniversary gift for Ted and Mary, but Larry stops the performance after becoming irritated with Sammi's singing. Larry gives Ted and Mary a $300 gift card to a high-end Italian restaurant as his anniversary gift to them, but gets offended when they use the gift card to take out Jeff and Susie. Larry becomes reacquainted with an old girlfriend, Mary Jane Porter (Sherry Stringfield), but later learns that she is in a relationship with another man and Mary Jane had revealed his name and address. To avoid Mary Jane's boyfriend, Larry flees to Dr. Morrison's and Ted's house, but is rejected by both before being accepted by Jeff and Susie. The next morning, Larry overhears Sammi singing again and yells "Shut the fuck up" at her, leading him to be kicked out by Susie. Later, while fleeing again from Mary Jane's boyfriend, Larry is spotted by Christian Slater, who eagerly points out his whereabouts to Mary Jane's boyfriend.
65	5	"Denise Handicap"	David Mandel	Larry David	October 18, 2009	1.08
Larry begins dating a disabled woman, Denise, who uses a wheelchair. He is pleased at the advantages of having a wheelchair-using significant other, including being given priority in restaurants. They plan to attend a Kim Chee Yun recital being held by Larry's friends. However, Larry cannot contact his new date after Susie throws his BlackBerry into the ocean. Trying to find Denise, Larry meets another wheelchair-using woman, Wendy, whom he takes instead. After arriving with her, Jeff shows him that Denise is also present, which leads to both women confronting Larry.
66	6	"The Bare Midriff"	Larry Charles	Larry David	October 25, 2009	1.05
Larry and Jerry have problems with their assistant (Jillian Bell), who always wears clothes that expose her large abdomen. Larry offends Richard. Larry accidentally splashes his urine onto the assistant's mother's painting of Jesus, which is misinterpreted by her as a miracle of making tears flow from Jesus' eyes. When Richard confronts Larry, it reminds the mother of her husband's murder, so she deliberately drives at Richard, wrongly assuming he is about to beat Larry up.
67	7	"The Black Swan"	Bryan Gordon	Larry David	November 1, 2009	0.98
Larry criticizes the social convention of introducing people. At his golf club, Larry berates Norm for playing slowly; Norm dies of a heart attack shortly after, which Larry is blamed for. Larry kills Matsue Takahashi's black swan named Kyoko with his golf club when it flies close to him, which his friends find out about. He breaks the club's rule that mobile phones must be switched off when he forgets to turn off his BlackBerry. He seeks to correct a spelling mistake on his mother's gravestone. He offers to pay for his cousin Andy's daughter Skylar's college tuition fees. Larry accidentally offends the gravestone stonemason. The stonemason calls Larry a "Swan killer" on his mother's gravestone which Takahashi sees.
68	8	"Officer Krupke"	David Steinberg	Larry David	November 8, 2009	0.98
When Susie discovers the panties of a woman whom Jeff is cheating on her with in his car, he falsely claims they are Larry's in order to cover up the cheating, which Larry goes along with. Larry is trying on pants in Banana Republic when the fire alarm goes off, and has to leave wearing them, security tag attached. When he returns to the store to exchange them for his own pants, he finds that they have been lost, so he refuses to give back those he is wearing. Larry meets a police officer with the surname Krupke and is surprised with him being unaware that he shares his name with a West Side Story character. Cheryl competes for the Seinfeld role of George's ex-wife, but the role is instead given to Virginia (Elisabeth Shue). Virginia and her husband Dennis (John Schneider) offer Cheryl a threesome, angering Larry, who wants Cheryl to have a threesome with him instead. A bearded Ben Affleck has an uncredited cameo role exiting Banana Republic.
69	9	"The Table Read"	Larry Charles	Larry David	November 15, 2009	1.26
At the Seinfeld reunion table read, Larry befriends a nine-year-old girl (Sierra McCormick) who later annoys him by frequently text-messaging him. To calm Michael Richards' nerves, Leon poses as a man who had battled Groat's disease, which fails when the widow of the man Leon is pretending to be tells Michael that her husband died two months ago. Jerry Seinfeld and Marty bond over a joke. Larry regrets lending his pen to Jason Alexander. Many Seinfeld supporting actors are shown rehearsing their roles in the reunion special, including Steve Hytner (Kenny Bania), Estelle Harris (Estelle Costanza), and Wayne Knight (Newman).
70	10	"Seinfeld"	Jeff Schaffer; Andy Ackerman (Seinfeld segment)	Larry David	November 22, 2009	1.33
Larry is hopeful that his plan is working when Cheryl invites him over to review the Seinfeld reunion script. But when an attempt to repay a favor to Mocha Joe causes Larry to miss the date, Cheryl turns to Jason for coaching, which makes Larry jealous. Julia Louis-Dreyfus wrongly blames Larry for leaving a ring stain on her antique wooden table, so he tries to find out who did so. When he discovers it was Cheryl, he asks her to phone Julia to tell her, which she refuses to do.

=== Season 8 (2011) ===
Larry finalizes his divorce from Cheryl and enjoys life as a single man. In order to avoid a charity gig, he goes with Jeff and Susie on a three-month trip to New York City, where he soon reunites with Leon.

Guest stars include: Ricky Gervais, Rosie O'Donnell, Michael J. Fox, Gary Cole, Larry Miller, Harry Hamlin, Michael McKean, Amy Landecker, Ana Gasteyer, and Michael Bloomberg.

No. overall	No. in season	Title	Directed by	Story by	Original release date	U.S. viewers (millions)
71	1	"The Divorce"	David Steinberg	Larry David, Alec Berg, David Mandel & Jeff Schaffer	July 10, 2011	1.71
Cheryl leaves Larry after she refuses to tell Julia that she caused the ring stain on her table. A year later, the couple prepares to finalize their divorce, and Larry is happy with his apparently Jewish lawyer Andrew Berg (Paul F. Tompkins) negotiating for him to keep the large majority of his possessions, including his house. Larry's friend Joe O'Donnell (Gary Cole, a parody of Frank McCourt), owner of the Los Angeles Dodgers, is employing Berg to deal with his divorce. Larry tells O'Donnell he will buy boxes of Girl Scout Cookies from Joe's 13-year-old daughter Kiera (Kaitlyn Dever), but changes his mind when Joe reacts badly to Larry giving his daughter a tampon when she has her first period at Larry's house. Larry discovers that Berg is not Jewish and tells Joe; both men switch to being represented by Jewish lawyer Hiram Katz, whom Larry met in a restaurant. Three months later, Larry learns that Katz has given the Dodgers to O'Donnell's wife. He rushes to the office to stop the divorce paper signing, but is punched by O'Donnell en route; Cheryl receives the house as a result of the divorce settlement. Larry and Leon move to another house. Marty is going to London alone for three weeks. When Larry suggests to Marty's wife Nan that she join him for the trip, he is angry with Larry because he seeks to be away from Nan. The couple later decide to divorce, to Marty's joy.
72	2	"The Safe House"	Bryan Gordon	Larry David, Alec Berg, David Mandel & Jeff Schaffer	July 17, 2011	1.91
Richard is in a new relationship with burlesque performer Stella (Jan Anderson), but becomes irritated when Larry, Jeff, and Marty suggest he is dating Stella solely because of her large breasts. Larry and his friends go to see Stella dance, and Richard subsequently catches them in the parking lot. Richard and Larry are puzzled when Stella tells them later that she is having her breasts reduced by 50%. Larry talks to residents at a shelter for women who have recently left abusive relationships; one of them knocks him over. When he visits the hospital to have his injury treated, accompanied by Leon, the doctor treating Larry wrongly assumes that the injury was caused by Leon. In a café, a stranger asks Larry to watch his laptop while he is out of the building. Larry asks a black man to watch it. The owner attempts to hide his anger with Larry for doing that. The black man goes to Larry's house to return the laptop, where police arrest him, mistaking him for Leon. Richard Lewis gets his hands injured by a shelter woman and is unable to enjoy his girlfriend's breasts the night before her reduction.
73	3	"Palestinian Chicken"	Robert B. Weide	Larry David, Alec Berg, David Mandel & Jeff Schaffer	July 24, 2011	2.37
Marty becomes religious and starts to wear a kippah. Larry and Jeff go to a recently opened Palestinian chicken restaurant, Al-Abbas. Marty and Susie are angry with the restaurant opening a second location next door to a Jewish delicatessen. Marty was to accompany them to the restaurant, but Larry asks him to take off the kippah before entering, causing an altercation to break out between the two before Marty leaves. The incident is witnessed by people in the restaurant, who proceed to greet Larry with cheers when he enters. Larry draws the attention of an attractive Palestinian woman named Shara (Anne Bedian), and the two later have sex, which a horrified Marty walks in on. Larry's reputation as a "social assassin" is used by his friend Ron, who asks him to confront his wife Ilene's frequent usage of the word "LOL"; the confrontation causes Ilene to have an affair with their mutual friend Eddie, who asks Larry to keep it a secret. The Greenes' daughter Sammi later overhears Larry talking about the affair with Jeff, and uses her knowledge of the affair to blackmail Larry into telling Susie to stop smacking her lips after drinking. On the golf course, at which all the group of friends are present, Larry confronts Susie about her habit, which sparks an argument, leading to Sammi revealing the affair, and Ron and Ilene walking off.
74	4	"The Smiley Face"	Jeff Schaffer	Larry David, Alec Berg, David Mandel & Jeff Schaffer	July 31, 2011	2.10
Larry's assistant Antoinette is on leave to take care of her ill father, causing chaos in Larry's office. Larry also has a dispute with next-door producer Dino "Big Dog" (Harry Hamlin) over cabinet boundaries. Larry later convinces Antoinette to come back to work for one day, but her father dies on the same day. Larry has a fling with Heidi, an attractive woman who works at a restaurant which he frequents. She borrows $60 from him and he is annoyed at her not repaying it, as well as her using smiley faces in text messages to him. She responds by drawing a smiley face on his head in sunblock, causing Larry to attend Antoinette's father's funeral with a smiley-face tan; Antoinette's mother later agrees to work as Larry's assistant. Jeff invents an ill-fated excuse to get out of a dinner engagement, causing Susie to wrongly believe that Jeff is having an affair with Antoinette's mother when Susie sees Jeff hugging her.
75	5	"Vow of Silence"	Alec Berg	Larry David, Alec Berg, David Mandel & Jeff Schaffer	August 7, 2011	2.05
The Greenes are set to embark on a three-month trip to New York for Sammi to attend a Juilliard School summer program. At the "farewell party", Larry is forced to park outside the parking space boundaries because a Red Volvo had done so as well. Later, Larry runs into Matt Tessler (Michael McKean), who asks him to participate in a charity event; Larry feigns an excuse by saying he will be in New York. Tessler later tells Larry that the event has been postponed, so Larry tells him he will be in New York for three months. Tessler, in response, offers Larry his friend's apartment in Manhattan, forcing Larry to actually fly to New York. The Greenes' dog, Oscar, becomes terminally ill and is forced to be euthanized. Susie asks Larry and Jeff to pick up Pinkberry frozen yogurt for Oscar as his last meal. However, on the drive back, the two inadvertently eat the frozen yogurt, which is witnessed by their friend Vance (Michael Hitchcock) on the street. Larry and Jeff lie to Susie that the store had closed, forcing Oscar to be put down without a last meal. At Oscar's Shiva, Vance (who has taken a "vow of silence" and can only communicate through mouthing) attempts to tell Susie about Larry and Jeff eating the yogurt, but they manage to stop him. Later, while meeting with Jeff and Susie, Larry finds the Red Volvo that had parked out of boundaries and leaves an angry note on the car. Vance, who is the car's owner, finds the note and sees Larry; Vance proceeds to break his vow of silence and yells the truth to Susie, angering her.
76	6	"The Hero"	Alec Berg	Larry David, Alec Berg, David Mandel & Jeff Schaffer	August 14, 2011	2.31
Larry accidentally becomes a hero on a flight after tripping over his shoelaces and taking down a disruptive passenger, impressing Donna, who starts dating him. Susie later reveals the truth, and Donna loses interest. Meanwhile, Larry clashes with Ricky Gervais over an expensive bottle of wine, paid Broadway tickets, and insults Ricky's play, costing Jeff a potential client. In the end, Larry genuinely saves Ricky and Donna from a subway mugger, only to have his shoelace caught in the train doors as he leaves.
77	7	"The Bi-Sexual"	David Mandel	Larry David, Alec Berg, David Mandel & Jeff Schaffer	August 21, 2011	2.08
Larry competes with Rosie O'Donnell for the same bisexual woman, explores the nuances of Japanese bows, and refuses lunch with an LA acquaintance.
78	8	"Car Periscope"	David Mandel	Larry David, Alec Berg, David Mandel & Jeff Schaffer	August 28, 2011	1.87
Larry and Jeff weigh an investment opportunity; Wanda Sykes preempts Larry's training schedule; Cheyenne Jackson guest-stars as Larry's personal trainer.
79	9	"Mister Softee"	Larry Charles	Larry David, Alec Berg, David Mandel & Jeff Schaffer	September 4, 2011	1.43
A jingle from Mister Softee trucks triggers traumatic memories for Larry. He reveals to his therapist Dr. Thurgood (Fred Melamed) the traumatic experience: when Larry was a boy, he was playing strip poker with a girl in her father's Mister Softee truck; when the father finds them, he ejects a naked Larry from the truck, causing people on the street to laugh at him. Later, during a softball championship game, the jingle causes Larry to make a costly error (similar to that of Bill Buckner's error in Game 6 of the 1986 World Series, where the ball rolls between his legs with the winning run coming to the plate that loses his team the game). He also loses his libido, affecting his relationship with his girlfriend Jennifer (Ana Gasteyer). As a result of his error, Larry's softball team captain and mechanic Yari (Robert Smigel) refuses to fix his car, causing the passenger seat to become unstable. For Jeff's birthday, Susie asks Larry to get a Mookie Wilson-autographed baseball at a card signing show. At the show, Larry runs into Dr. Thurgood and Bill Buckner, the latter of whom Larry asks for advice and befriends. However, Buckner loses the Wilson-autographed baseball after missing a throw from Larry. The unstable seat in Larry's car causes Jennifer (Ana Gasteyer) to have an orgasm. Larry later discovers that Dr. Thurgood billed him for their conversation at the signing event, and confronts him at his office to no avail. Leon, wearing glasses, manages to convince Dr. Thurgood to drop the bill and steals his Mookie Wilson-autographed ball and gives it to Larry. Susie asks Larry to give her a ride to her cousin's burning building, causing her to have an orgasm in front of a disgusted Larry before the car crashes into a Mister Softee truck. At the burning building, a trapped woman is forced to throw her baby out of the window, and a passerby Bill Buckner makes a diving catch to save the baby and is hailed as a hero.
80	10	"Larry vs. Michael J. Fox"	Alec Berg	Larry David, Alec Berg, David Mandel & Jeff Schaffer	September 11, 2011	2.04
Larry meets Jennifer's son Greg, a flamboyant child with an interest in fashion. Upon learning of Greg's interest, Larry buys him a sewing machine for his birthday to Greg's excitement and Jennifer's chagrin; she later asks Larry to buy him another gift. Larry suspects Michael J. Fox, his upstairs neighbor, of scolding him at a bar. When he asks Michael whether he was scolding him or not, Fox claims it was a Parkinson's twitch. Larry later receives a shaken Coke from Michael that explodes, and he begins to hear loud noises at night. He suspects harassment from Michael, but Fox once again claims it was side effects of his condition. Larry complains to the building's board about Michael, but they all side with Fox and ask for him to make amends by attending Michael's charity event. Larry meets Jennifer and Susie at the park to give Greg his other gift, a violin, but Greg shows up with a gift to Susie – a pillow sham with a swastika on it (which Larry had earlier shown to Greg when he met him). Susie angrily charges Larry, but is in the path of an oncoming bike; Jeff pushes her out the way and takes the hit. Later, at Michael's charity event, Larry signals to Jeff what he bought for Greg – a sign mistaken as a mockery of Parkinson's; Larry is jeered by the crowd and ejected from the event by Mayor Bloomberg. Afterwards, Larry once again attempts to reconcile with Michael, who asks him to do a charity gig. To get out of the obligation, Larry and Leon head to Paris.

=== Season 9 (2017) ===
Larry incurs a fatwa from the Supreme Leader of Iran, Ayatollah Abdullah Kazemeyni, after lampooning the Ayatollahs while appearing on Jimmy Kimmel Live! to promote his latest, long-awaited project, a comedy musical called Fatwa!, centered on The Satanic Verses controversy, in which Ayatollah Khomeini ordered a fatwa against Salman Rushdie in 1989.

No. overall	No. in season	Title	Directed by	Story by	Original release date	U.S. viewers (millions)
81	1	"Foisted!"	Jeff Schaffer	Larry David & Jeff Schaffer	October 1, 2017	1.54
Larry shows Jeff his finished script for a musical comedy he has been writing, Fatwa!, based on Salman Rushdie's life. Larry rids himself of an inept assistant (Carrie Brownstein) by suggesting her to Susie. Leon takes it upon himself to become Larry's new assistant. Larry gives his unwanted opinions about a lesbian wedding, causing disastrous results for the couple; and offends Richard by not being empathetic that his parakeet has died. When Larry goes on Jimmy Kimmel Live! to promote Fatwa!, Larry does an impression of the Ayatollah. The next day, news breaks that the actual Ayatollah, angered by the impression, has issued a fatwa against Larry.
82	2	"The Pickle Gambit"	David Steinberg	Larry David & Jeff Schaffer & Justin Hurwitz	October 8, 2017	1.13
Larry, having assumed the alias "Buck Dancer" and wearing a disguise (a wig and a mustache) in public, returns home after living in a hotel due to the fear of the fatwa. Larry argues with the hotel concierge about their policy regarding using tongs to pick up the free cookies in the lobby. Marty brings his nephew Kenny, an All-American pitcher, to Larry's house and Kenny ends up breaking his elbow when trying to open a pickle jar. This prevents him from masturbating, which causes him to behave badly from the sexual frustration. Larry suggests they a hire a prostitute (Bianca Kajlich) for Kenny, whom Larry recently met at the hotel, and to whom he gave unexpectedly helpful advice about toning down her attire to attract a better class of client. Ted Danson, who has recently divorced his wife Mary Steenburgen, asks for Larry's permission to date Cheryl. Leon hires a security guard for Larry, who is scared for his life. Larry gets help from one of his old lovers, Shara, who puts him in touch with the Consul of Iran, but things go awry when Leon and his guard interrupt Larry's meeting.
83	3	"A Disturbance in the Kitchen"	Jeff Schaffer	Larry David & Jeff Schaffer	October 15, 2017	1.12
Larry is annoyed at a restaurant manager (Rich Fulcher) who refuses to tell him the specifics of the "disturbance" in the kitchen, which is causing his and Jeff's food to be delayed. Susie is worried about her "little sister" who has gone missing and not returned home. Larry is given a ticket after he honks at the police car stopped in front of him at a green light. Larry contests the ticket in court, but loses, at least partly because of his behavior. Larry seeks advice from Salman Rushdie (played by himself) about his fatwa situation. Larry takes his advice to live normally, and removes his disguise. As Rushdie predicts, he becomes very attractive to women because he is "dangerous," and catches the attention of actress Elizabeth Banks.
84	4	"Running with the Bulls"	Bryan Gordon	Larry David & Jeff Schaffer	October 22, 2017	1.11
In therapy, Larry sees Dr. Templeton (Bryan Cranston) about his fatwa, but finds himself more occupied with how comfortable Dr. Templeton's chair is versus his own. Larry and Jeff go to Richard's art opening, where they learn from Marty that Kenny was killed by being trampled by bulls after following the prostitute to Spain. Larry remains mum about his involvement with introducing Kenny to the prostitute. Jeff begins an affair with a real estate agent. When Susie confronts him after being told by someone that he was seen with a woman in a car, Jeff claims he is house shopping. Later, Susie becomes suspicious of Jeff and makes him buy the new home the agent shows them. At Kenny's memorial service, Larry mistakenly believes he sees a fatwa assassin, which causes everyone to panic and run out of the building in the middle of the service.
85	5	"Thank You for Your Service"	Larry Charles	Larry David & Jeff Schaffer	October 29, 2017	0.80
Larry is tired of having to listen to Sal, the golf club's gate attendant, every time he drives to the security gate. In the golf club restaurant, Larry offends a fellow member, Ken, when he remarks that Ken's new baby looks a little Asian, despite both parents being white. Larry goes on a date with his mail carrier (Katie Aselton), but after things go wrong, he wants to "reset" their relationship back to homeowner and mailwoman. At the golf club, Larry also offends Sal by trying to "reset" their relationship. The club's owner, Mr. Takahashi, learns of Larry's remarks about Ken's child. He summons Larry to his office and tells him to expect a letter "soon" from the club about consequences, which leads to an argument about the meaning of "soon." However, Larry's mail carrier, offended by his attempted "reset," has stopped delivering his mail. At a dinner party at Jeff and Susie's, Larry offends Sammi's Afghanistan War veteran fiancé Victor when he does not join all the others in saying in turn as they meet him, "Thank you for your service." To make amends, Larry invites him to a Revolutionary War reenactment at the golf club. However, at the reenactment, Sal starts firing live cannonballs at Larry, triggering Victor's war memories. Larry later discovers Mr. Takahashi kissing Ken's wife, ending any possible ban from the club.
86	6	"The Accidental Text on Purpose"	Larry Charles	Larry David & Jeff Schaffer & Jon Hayman	November 5, 2017	0.83
Larry gives relationship advice to both Richard and Marty when they get in trouble with their new girlfriends, Rhonda (Andrea Savage) and Marilyn (Elizabeth Perkins). Larry also helps Jeff mend a problem, with the idea of sending an "accidental text on purpose." Larry ends up offending both Rhonda and Marilyn, who give them an ultimatum–Larry or them. Richard and Marty both choose their girlfriends, but Rhonda and Marilyn become wise to Larry's plan (including the "accidental text on purpose") and end their relationships.
87	7	"Namaste"	Jessie Nelson	Larry David & Jeff Schaffer	November 12, 2017	0.88
Larry and Leon go to a hot yoga class, where Larry is kicked out for not saying "namaste." Leon gets the phone number of the instructor (Alison Becker). In the parking lot, Larry hits a car and leaves a note. Susie informs Larry that one of her friends, Bridget (Lauren Graham), is interested in dating him. Larry offends Jeff's mechanic, remarking that he did not expect him to be black after talking on the phone with him. Larry has a harsh exchange over the phone with the man (Marc Evan Jackson) whose car he hit. When the man comes to Larry's house, Leon answers the door, and the man quickly apologizes and says he will pay for the damages. Larry goes on a date with Bridget, and they have a great time. At her home, the date is interrupted by her son Eddie, who is immediately hostile to Larry and whom Bridget says has undiagnosed Asperger's. To fix the problem with the mechanic, Larry claims to be on the "spectrum" to explain his previous rude behavior, resulting in the mechanic changing attitude completely, offering to fix his car immediately, free of charge. Larry gets a text from Bridget to come over because they will be home alone, but Larry is without a car and cannot take an Uber because he recently offended a Romanian Uber driver by saying that Romanian women are ugly and as a result has a low Uber rating. Larry boards a bus, but soon argues with the driver, who kicks him off.
88	8	"Never Wait for Seconds!"	Robert B. Weide	Larry David & Jeff Schaffer	November 19, 2017	0.91
Cesar, a handyman, fixes a humming in Larry's office. In return, Larry offers a tip, but Cesar refuses. However, Cesar continually asks Larry for favors. Bridget tells Larry she is considering sending Eddie to a boarding school, Larry happily tells her he will put in a good word. Larry and Bridget meet Marty and Marilyn (now back together) for lunch, and Larry apologizes to Marilyn for his previous behavior. However, he ends up commenting on Marilyn's excessive use of ketchup. At the buffet line, Larry defends a man who cuts in line, because he is going for seconds, and believes he should not have to wait. The man is a devout Muslim and offers his help to Larry regarding his fatwa. Larry meets with admissions representatives at Pemberton Academy to talk about Eddie, and if his relationship with Bridget will be long-term. Larry asks them a favor: if Cesar and his family could use their pool. Bridget later learns that Eddie was not accepted, due to the condition in which Cesar and his family left the Pemberton Academy pool. The Muslim man, Morsi, interviews people from Larry's past, and later puts him in front of a panel of muftis, who agree to recommend the Ayatollah rescind the fatwa.
89	9	"The Shucker"	Jeff Schaffer	Larry David & Jeff Schaffer & Justin Hurwitz	November 26, 2017	0.97
Larry's fatwa is revoked and his musical is back on, but only if Lin-Manuel Miranda is involved. At a dinner party at Larry's house, the oyster shucker (Steven Weber) overhears Larry say he fell asleep during Hamilton. In his exchange for his silence, the shucker demands tickets to Hamilton. Larry and Jeff meet with Lin to discuss the musical, and Larry ends up giving in to all of Lin's creative demands. Lin gets tickets for Larry, but only after Larry says they're for him, after originally requesting tickets for his shucker. Lin tells Larry he will be sitting next to his wife, so he will know if Larry's there or not. Jeff begins wearing the cowboy hat that the shucker left at Larry's house, which turns Susie on. After Larry gives back the hat to the shucker, Susie spots him with the hat on, and they later have a short affair. The previous owner of Larry's house, Mrs. Shapiro, begins reappearing at the house, much to Larry's annoyance, and ends up stealing a dying plant. Larry and Mrs. Shapiro go on Judge Judy, but Larry loses the case because now the plant is in much better condition. After Larry learns that Bridget has been telling intimate details about her previous relationships, he tries to make her sign a non-disclosure agreement while in bed. This does not go well, and Bridget breaks up with him. At the Hamilton performance, Larry ends up falling asleep next to Lin's wife.
90	10	"Fatwa!"	Jeff Schaffer	Larry David & Jeff Schaffer & Justin Hurwitz & Jon Hayman	December 3, 2017	0.88
Larry and Jeff watch the rehearsals for Fatwa!, which are going great. Larry plans a paintball game for the cast and crew, which gets him many thank-you's. Larry has dinner reservations with Jeff, Susie and Marty, but the hostess refuses to seat them because Marty is not there yet. In response, Larry asks a random woman to join them as a stand-in. Lin and Larry get into a creative argument over a scene that Lin doesn't think is working, but Larry believes it's because the attractive sign language interpreter with large breasts is causing a distraction. Larry clashes with F. Murray Abraham, who plays the Ayatollah, when he thinks Murray is "outfit-tracking" him because he wore the same pants two days in a row. Larry agrees to let Lin's cousin Valentina (Tipper Newton) and her husband stay at his house, and Larry is dissatisfied with Lin's "thank you". Unbeknownst to Larry, the couple are swingers and end up trashing Larry's house. The day of the paintball game is the same day as Sammi's wedding, but Larry promises to be there because he is delivering a speech. At the paintball game, Larry expresses his frustration over Lin's family, saying that they abused his hospitality. Lin challenges him to a paintball duel, where Larry accidentally shoots him in the mouth. Larry accompanies him to the hospital and misses Sammi's wedding. Larry calls the stand-in actress and has her make his speech at the wedding. Due to Lin's injury, he cannot perform for six months, which puts an end to the musical. The next day, Larry is spotted by an Iranian man on the street, who doesn't know the fatwa has been revoked and begins chasing him.

=== Season 10 (2020) ===
Larry is accused of sexual harassment by his assistant Alice and his attempts to control the situation only serve to make things worse. At the same time, Larry intends to open his own coffee shop, which he calls a spite store, right next to Mocha Joe's out of spite, regarding petty grievances.

No. overall	No. in season	Title	Directed by	Story by	Original release date	U.S. viewers (millions)
91	1	"Happy New Year"	Jeff Schaffer	Larry David & Jeff Schaffer & Steve Leff	January 19, 2020	0.708
Larry cleans his glasses with his assistant's shirt while she is wearing it causing her to become uncomfortable and accuse him of sexual harassment. Larry and Leon go to Mocha Joe's and Larry complains about a wobbly table, cold coffee, and the softness of the scones. Larry is then banned from the coffee shop. At a dinner party at Jeff and Susie's, Jeff is commonly mistaken for Harvey Weinstein by various women and receives dirty looks. Larry accidentally touches a server's breast when trying to grab food from the tray. With Ted Danson out of town, Larry offers to drive Cheryl home, and they kiss in the car and end up having sex together in bed. After getting the idea from Jeff, Larry wears a Make America Great Again hat to get out of having lunch with Philip Rosenthal, believing that if he is seen as a Trump supporter, good people will want nothing to do with him. The server from the dinner party calls Larry's office and talks with his assistant Alice about the incident. In an act of spite, Larry leases the location next to Mocha Joe's, and tells Joe that he will be opening a coffee shop as well. It will be called Latte Larry's and everything will be cheaper. Cheryl has an allergic reaction to Larry's talcum powder while having sex and winds up in the hospital. Susie figures out their secret and Larry bolts from the hospital when he learns Ted has returned.
92	2	"Side Sitting"	Jeff Schaffer	Larry David & Jeff Schaffer	January 26, 2020	0.683
Larry meets with his lawyer Roger to discuss the sexual harassment complaint from his assistant Alice. Larry asks to use his private bathroom, but is denied access. Larry has a cancer scare and is angry when his friends do not inquire about how his tests went. At lunch with Cheryl, Larry hopes to get back together, but she does not want to. For Susie's birthday, Larry gives her a painted portrait of herself that he had commissioned, which Susie adores and absolves Larry of the horrible things he has done to her. Larry goes on a date with Rita (Teri Polo), the lawyer's assistant, and video records their date as proof of no wrongdoings due to his current legal situation. At a dinner party at Susie's, the portrait gets accidentally tarnished which angers Susie, but Larry promises to fix it. At another meeting with his lawyer, Larry uses his private bathroom while his office is empty. When Roger arrives, he senses Larry used his bathroom and questions him. Larry meets with Alice at a restaurant and calms her concerns, but Alice becomes offended and leaves when he sits too close to her, to prove to Ted Danson that he "side sits with everyone," after Ted was previously made aware that Larry was "side sitting" with Cheryl. At a deposition and under oath, Roger uses the opportunity to question Larry about whether he used his bathroom or not.
93	3	"Artificial Fruit"	Cheryl Hines	Larry David & Jeff Schaffer & Carol Leifer	January 31, 2020 (online); February 2, 2020 (HBO)	0.577
Larry hires a former New York pastry chef for his coffee shop and has him make scones that Larry gives to his friends to taste. At a meeting with his lawyer, Larry is told he needs to donate, as well as make a speech for Survivors United, a charity for survivors of sexual assault, in order to make amends with Alice and to make the sexual harassment suit go away. Larry and Richard Lewis argue over who will pay the bill for lunch, each of them wanting to pay themselves. Larry and Leon both have incidents involving artificial fruit where they chip a tooth. At the charity event hosted by Laverne Cox, Larry rejects a hug from her on stage because he was previously made aware from her that she has a cold. The audience, including Alice, assume it is because she is transgender and boos him. Alice now wants a personal monetary settlement as well. Before the meeting, Larry and Alice wait for the elevator and Larry offers Alice a scone, but it is too dry and Alice starts to choke. Larry begins to perform the Heimlich maneuver but hesitates because he does not know if it is appropriate to touch her, and she falls to the ground.
94	4	"You're Not Going to Get Me to Say Anything Bad About Mickey"	Jeff Schaffer	Larry David & Jeff Schaffer	February 9, 2020	0.441
After Alice collapsed in the elevator in the previous episode, she loses her memory, thus forgetting her sexual harassment claim. Larry, Leon, Jeff, Susie, and Cheryl all head over to Cabo San Lucas for a friend's wedding on a private jet. Larry gets frustrated when no one will tell him their weight, despite it being a request of the pilot. Larry begins dating a new woman, Donna (Megyn Price), and invites her along, but is concerned when he sees an older photo and determines that she is a yo-yo dieter. Once at the resort Larry runs into numerous issues. His room is much smaller than the others, the groom Mickey (Timothy Olyphant) will not let him borrow a toothbrush, despite having one extra, and he is charged an exorbitant amount for reporting a stain on a chair in his room. After borrowing a toothbrush off of Cheryl, Ted Danson arrives unexpectedly, and causes a scene when he sees Larry brushing his teeth in their bathroom. Leon discovers the hotel's coffee is incredible, and after failing to buy some beans, he and Larry steal some to take back for use in Larry's coffee shop. At the wedding, Ted reveals that he knows that Larry slept with Cheryl. Ted starts a fight, causing the groom to loudly berate Larry, and Jeff when he supports Larry. On the plane ride home, Larry gives the pilot everyone's weight which he garnered from a carnival barker who guesses peoples weights and correctly guessed Larry's weight earlier in the night, but because of the beans, Larry cannot fly home himself, and is forced to watch everyone else leave on the plane.
95	5	"Insufficient Praise"	Jeff Schaffer	Larry David & Jeff Schaffer	February 16, 2020	0.663
While overseeing preparations for the coffee shop, specifically the urinals, Ted Danson visits Larry to tell him he is now a financial backer for Mocha Joe's. Elsewhere, Freddy Funkhouser (Vince Vaughn) gifts Larry a sex doll which he does not intend to use. Larry also gets Freddy's uncle Moke addicted to internet porn. At lunch with Richard and his new girlfriend Carol (Isla Fisher), Larry gifts her a stole that belonged to his mother, after hearing a tragic story of how she lost her mother. However, he immediately learns that she is a 'professional crier' and believes he has been swindled. Larry also gets a new housekeeper from Susie, on condition that she visit two set days a week. However, the housekeeper asks Larry to come when she would work for Susie, as she intends to quit working for her, due to her foul mouth, leaving Susie furious. Jeff has a new client, Clive Owen, whom Larry deeply offends when he gives 'insufficient praise' to his one-man show that he performed. Ted learns of the sex doll from Larry's mailman, and immediately goes to tell Cheryl. Larry attempts to retrieve his stole from Carol, believing her story to be fake, and she angrily slaps him in the face. At Clive's show, Larry has Jeff hire Carol to cry during the performance, thus encouraging others to cry, and restoring Clive's confidence. After the show, however, Larry attempts to get the stole back, and is led away by a police officer. Clive and Carol meet, and begin a relationship, which is short-lived when Clive discovers her profession, and they get into a fight in the street, which leads to her presumed death after being hit by a van. Larry attempts to deflate the doll after discovering Leon has been using it, but is caught in a compromising position with it by his housekeeper, and Cheryl. Larry gives it to Freddy's uncle, thus solving his internet porn problem.
96	6	"The Surprise Party"	Erin O'Malley	Larry David & Jeff Schaffer	February 23, 2020	0.635
Larry meets Mocha Joe's mother, Mocha Jane, who vows to take him down. Larry also shows off special squatting toilets for women to Freddy, when he comes to visit Latte Larry's. Funkhouser, after hearing Larry's idea for a cup that stays hot, introduces him to an inventor (Alan Tudyk), who invents a cup with a heater attached. Susie requests Larry's help with throwing a surprise party for Jeff, despite Larry's objections relating to Jeff's heart condition. Susie refuses to budge, and Larry believes she is trying to kill him. While at the doctor's, Larry is caught behind Wally (Fred Armisen) who uses a walker and befriends him, using him to spy on Susie at a travel agency. Larry believes the inventor, Boris, is a white supremacist when he learns his dog is named Adolf, and responds to a Nazi salute. Larry manufactures a plan to have Jeff's cardiologist Andrew "Rusty" Holtzer (Greg Germann) at the party, despite not being invited, while his receptionist (Rebecca Romijn) is feeling uncomfortable with all his unannounced visits. Wally lends Larry his handicapped sign, which he and Leon immediately abuse, and Boris' dog eats. Without his handicapped sign, Wally struggles to find a parking space at Jeff's surprise party, where Chris Martin of Coldplay is performing. Since he cannot find a space, he cannot warn Jeff of the surprise party in time, as Larry had asked him to do. Although Jeff is fine, his cardiologist is loudly berated by Susie when she sees him, and he suffers a heart attack.
97	7	"The Ugly Section"	Jeff Schaffer	Larry David & Jeff Schaffer	March 1, 2020	0.645
Larry is disappointed at being repeatedly seated in the rear section of a restaurant among people he perceives to be ugly, until he can blackmail the maître d' (Nick Kroll) into letting him sit near the windows with the good-looking people. Larry seeks to court a woman (Jane Krakowski) with an apparently magical vagina. She is the widow of his old golf buddy who killed himself days earlier due to disappointment from the many years of lackluster skills of the New York Jets.
98	8	"Elizabeth, Margaret and Larry"	Jeff Schaffer	Larry David & Jeff Schaffer	March 8, 2020	0.747
Jeff tells Larry that actor Jon Hamm is playing a Larry-type character in a movie. Hamm wants to learn the role, so he shadows Larry for a day. Susie and Jeff are fighting and she throws Jeff out of the house. Jeff goes to live with Larry. Leon and Larry go into business providing short term relief for workers who need to use the bathroom during their shifts. Cheryl tells Larry that her estranged sister Becky (Kaitlin Olson) is selling the house that Larry gave her as a gift. Angry that Becky will turn a profit, Larry confronts her, asking for the money back. The two end up having sex and begin a relationship, much to Cheryl's chagrin. After breaking her leg in a skiing accident, Becky is disappointed by Larry's failure to hurry to Denver to see her and she breaks up with him. Larry and Hamm get thrown out of a dinner party hosted by Richard, his girlfriend (Sasha Alexander), and Larry's cousin Andy (Richard Kind). Hamm becomes too similar to Larry, and Cheryl storms out on him during a coffee date.
99	9	"Beep Panic"	Jeff Schaffer	Larry David & Jeff Schaffer	March 15, 2020	0.691
Latte Larry's is a big success and even Mocha Joe is impressed. He gets into a price war with Larry but finds it hard to match his low prices, and stresses out. Ted Danson, who is friends with Mocha Joe, suggests he borrow some of his confidential screener DVD's to destress. Larry repeatedly takes his BMW dealership under false pretenses just to eat their German licorice candy. Susie plans to go out of town and Larry, Jeff, Richard and Freddy plan use that time to go to Pebble Beach. But Jeff expresses his joy a little too much while dropping Susie at the airport, that she suspects something is afoot and cancels her trip - thereby canceling the men's Pebble Beach trip. A waitress contaminates the food served at the Golf club restaurant and Mr. Takashi fires her. Larry sympathizes with her and gives her a job at Latte Larry's. He stops at the BMW dealership on the way, and gets into an argument with the salesperson. He ends up buying a new car (with a box of licorice candy) and gifts his current car to the waitress. But the waitress T-Bones his new car. She also quits her job, sells Larry's old car and uses the money to travel around. While watching the screen DVD loaned by Ted, Mocha Joe hatches up a plan and requests to meet with Larry to arrive at a compromise. Larry and Lean eat a lot of licorice from the dealership and that upsets their stomach. While both are in the bathroom, Mocha Joe steals some of Larry's screener material and distributes across town . Larry ends paying a hefty fine for copyright violation. Larry gives the remaining licorice to Susie, who in turns gifts it to Richard. Richard eats too much of that and experiences diarrhea during his stage play.
100	10	"The Spite Store"	Jeff Schaffer	Larry David & Jeff Schaffer & Justin Hurwitz	March 22, 2020	0.843
Latte Larry's is featured in a Today Show segment documenting the spite store trend that it has spawned. Also featured are Jonah's Deli (Jonah Hill) and Sean's Exotic Birds (Sean Penn). Larry's doctor informs him that his knee requires arthroscopic surgery, then becomes irritated when Larry seeks a second opinion. Larry sees recently transitioned Joey Funkhouser nude in his country club's locker room and questions whether he will be able to manage his large penis. Leon invites Joey to join the Big Johnson community. Larry confronts a group of firefighters in his store who admit to using their sirens to expedite coffee runs. Alice visits Latte Larry's, but her memory loss prevents her from remembering their history and her planned lawsuit. Larry spreads discord between Susie's expectant friends Tara and Will when he inquires about their preference for the child's skin color. Larry offers to have Will's watch repaired at his jeweler, only to find it has been driven out of business by a spite store run by Mila Kunis. Larry confronts an ambulance driver who also admits to using sirens to expedite coffee runs. Larry forgets the watch on the counter in the club locker room, where it is accidentally knocked on the floor by Joey's penis. Upon tasting a scone, Alice regains her memory of the incident with Larry, flees the store and falls into Mocha Joe's arms. At the hospital for Tara's delivery, Larry runs into both of his knee doctors, who lock horns. Changing out of his uniform at the coffee shop, Joey inadvertently knocks over a self-heating mug with his penis, sparking a fire that engulfs both Latte Larry's and Mocha Joe's. The dispatched fire truck is delayed by Larry who, assuming the truck is engaging in siren abuse, does not allow it to pass. At the scene, a fireman confides to Larry that several of the café's design features hindered their efforts and may lead to the fire being considered arson. Mocha Joe and Alice, now a couple, purchase the house adjacent to Larry's out of spite and throw a raucous party.

=== Season 11 (2021) ===
After a burglar drowns in Larry's pool, the police inform Larry he must have a five-foot (1.5 m) fence around his pool. The burglar's brother, Marcos, extorts Larry by threatening to sue him, unless Larry casts Marcos' daughter, Maria Sofia, in his new Netflix show about himself in his 20s. Maria Sofia lacks acting skills, so Larry seeks to have the fence law changed. He does so by beginning a relationship with an unattractive, unpleasant councilwoman, so he can eject Maria Sofia from his show. Leon breaks up with his girlfriend Mary Ferguson after purchasing non-refundable plane tickets to Asia for the pair. Leon tries to find another woman with the same name to replace his ex on the trip.

No. overall	No. in season	Title	Directed by	Story by	Original release date	U.S. viewers (millions)
101	1	"The Five-Foot Fence"	Jeff Schaffer	Larry David & Jeff Schaffer	October 24, 2021	0.486
Larry is awakened in the middle of the night by a loud crashing noise and discovers a dead body in his pool. It was a burglar fleeing his house who tripped and drowned in his pool. Larry is told by police (Merrick McCartha) that he needs to have a fence around his pool. Larry successfully pitches a new show to Netflix about himself when he was in his 20s, called Young Larry. Larry tries to get back the $6000 he is owed by his friend Dennis, but due to Dennis's early-onset dementia, he believes he has already paid him. Larry is dating Lucy Liu and they attend a dinner party where Larry spills red wine on the couch due to Susie plopping down on the couch, but only Larry is blamed. Leon mentions he and his girlfriend Mary Ferguson are going on a trip to Asia. Larry also walks into a screen glass door. This causes Lucy to view Larry in a different way and she breaks up with him. Larry is extorted by Marcos, the brother of the man who died in his pool and forces Larry to cast his daughter Maria Sofia in Larry's Netflix show. Larry and his friends attend a living funeral for Albert Brooks, but the attendees discover that Albert is a COVID hoarder and has closets full of hand sanitizer and toilet paper, causing everyone to leave in disgust. While leaving, Leon's girlfriend walks into a screen glass door and he later breaks up with her. Because the tickets to Asia are non-refundable, he begins searching for another woman named Mary Ferguson to go with him.
102	2	"Angel Muffin"	Jeff Schaffer	Larry David & Jeff Schaffer	October 31, 2021	0.409
Larry is frustrated with a toilet seat that will not stay up. Leon's date is offended when Larry thinks she should give him her leftover steak at a lunch he is paying for, when she wants to take it home for her dog, Angel Muffin. The dog later visits Larry's home and vomits the leftover steak on Larry's carpet. Susie insults Larry's well-worn towels, calling them ratty. She is angry that Jeff prefers Larry's type of towels to her new soft fluffy ones. Jeff and Larry go to a rock concert to meet Dylan O'Brien, the proposed lead in Young Larry. Larry offends Dylan by stuffing tissue paper in his ears because he dislikes the music. Larry is suspicious that the Netflix boss is not telling the truth about asking the maintenance worker to fix the faulty toilet seat. Larry goes to a dentist who Jeff recommends. Jeff tells Larry that he had an affair with the hygienist there and she told him that he impregnated her. Jeff paid for an abortion but doubts whether it was real, and asks Larry to scope it out while he is there. Larry witnesses the hygienist showing off new diamond earrings and talking about her plan to take a long overseas holiday. Larry offends the dentist by asking for the traditional Greek music that is played at the surgery to be turned off, and is told to leave before the procedure is complete. Larry uses Angel Muffin to try to apologize to Dylan, but the dog is accidentally hit by a car and the apology fails. Larry pays for the vet's bills, but doubts whether they are all genuine. Larry is fired from Netflix after accusing the boss of not telling the maintenance man to fix the toilet. Larry goes back to the dentist with tissue paper in his ears to block the Greek music, and therefore fails to hear the dentist telling him that the hygienist had had an abortion the previous week, and also that the maintenance worker is very lazy and never does what he is asked to.
103	3	"The Mini Bar"	Jeff Schaffer	Larry David & Jeff Schaffer	November 7, 2021	0.370
Larry and Jeff have a meeting at Hulu regarding Young Larry. Talking about casting, the Hulu executive recommends Ted Danson for the role of Uncle Mo. They also ask Larry for an audition tape for Maria Sofia. Larry asks Cheryl to give Maria Sofia acting lessons and to record an audition tape. At a dinner party at Jeff and Susie's, Larry talks with Freddy Funkhouser, who has bought a hotel and Larry tells him he wants to curate the minibar. At dinner, Larry's cousin Andy and his wife Cassie sit at the middle of table, which causes problems because they are at the center of attention, boring everyone with their conversation. Eventually, Larry and Freddy take over the middle seats and the rest of the dinner party goes smoothly. They talk about taking the advice from someone who has stage 4 cancer and the wisdom they would have. Cheryl tries to film an audition tape for Maria Sofia, but it goes terribly due to Maria Sofia having no acting skills. Larry goes shopping for the minibar and presents it to Freddy and his associates, but they do not like it. Larry and Jeff go to see Marcos at his restaurant, where Jeff pretends to have stage 4 cancer and offers advice to Marcos to not let her daughter become an actor, which he takes. Maria Sofia sees Cheryl again and Maria thinks Cheryl has stolen her jacket after giving her a compliment on it prior. Maria uses this rage while doing a scene and gets into an altercation with her and Ted, all while the camera is still filming. The Hulu executives see the tape and think it is hilarious and cast her in the show.
104	4	"The Watermelon"	Jeff Schaffer	Larry David & Jeff Schaffer	November 14, 2021	0.527
Larry and Jeff consider Woody Harrelson for the Uncle Mo role in Young Larry. Susie asks Larry and Jeff to take their rabbi golfing as a favor. While golfing, Larry loses a bet to the rabbi and is forced to go to temple. Larry discovers that Leon is embarrassed to eat watermelon in front of him, due to the stereotype. Woody, who is an animal rights activist, has a meeting at Larry's house and questions him about his coffee cream. Larry tells him he owns a farm and gets it directly from his cow and Woody requests to visit his farm. Larry has an appointment with Freddy's optometrist girlfriend Heidi, during which he is surprised and disappointed when he sees her drop a piece of Pirate's Booty snack on the ground and intentionally not pick it up. Larry leaves the appointment with blurry eyes after having them dilated and bumps into a Klansman, Joe, spilling coffee on his robe. Larry takes the robe to a Jewish dry cleaner, which he originally refuses to clean but accepts it due to Larry saying they should not discriminate. At temple, Larry tells Freddy about what happened with Heidi. After the service, the rabbi gives Larry the shofar as a gift. Larry returns to the dry cleaners and discovers they have lost the robe (presumably on purpose). Larry visits Joe at his home and tells him he will replace the robe. Larry sees Joe lives on farmland with cows and asks him for a favor. Since Larry did Susie a favor, he asks her to sew a new robe, to which she eventually begrudgingly agrees. Larry takes Woody to Joe's farm pretending it to be his own. Upon leaving, Woody drops a grape on Joe's front porch and does not pick it up which causes an argument and Woody quits Larry's show. At lunch, Freddy questions Heidi about the incident and she storms off. At the optometrist, Heidi angrily confronts Larry and slams the phoropter against his eyes. Larry, with blurry vision again, rear-ends a woman with his car and learns her name is Mary Ferguson. Larry takes Mary to his house and they walk in on Leon and his friend eating watermelon, which she reacts to by leaving. At a rally, Joe puts on his new robe, sewn by Susie, but is attacked by other members when they see it has the Star of David sewn on the back. Joe angrily goes to Larry's at night to confront him, but Larry scares Joe away by blowing the shofar, causing the entire neighborhood to wake up.
105	5	"IRASSHAIMASE!"	Robert B. Weide	Larry David & Jeff Schaffer & Carol Leifer	November 21, 2021	0.405
Larry has lunch with Jeff and Freddy at the country club and Jeff sets up Larry with a date with a producer named Gabby McAfee (Julie Bowen). Larry's friend Hal's (Rob Morrow) father Saul has a heart attack at the country club and Larry offends him after he eventually sits back down to eat while everyone else remains standing. Larry later further offends Hal by refusing to pray for his father, who eventually dies. On the way to the date, Larry discovers one of the buttons on his shirt is missing and Freddy agrees to lend him a shirt. At a Japanese restaurant, Larry offends the sushi chefs when he also uses the greeting "irasshaimase" to greet Gabby, not knowing that the greeting means "welcome to my restaurant." During the date, he and Gabby exchange secrets: Gabby had sex with one of her students when she was a high school teacher and Larry knows a shortcut to the San Fernando Valley. As payback for Larry's use of their greeting, the chefs intentionally yell "irasshaimase" loudly, causing Larry to spill soy sauce on Freddy's shirt and leading to a shouting match between Larry and the chefs. Larry reveals to Freddy the ruined shirt and he is devastated as it had been his favorite shirt; he asks Larry to give him his favorite shirt as compensation but Larry refuses. At the country club, Larry, now obsessed with the "irasshaimase" greeting but still not knowing what it means, continues to use it to greet people until he is reprimanded by Mr. Takahashi for using it. Later, Larry realizes he left his umbrella at the restaurant, but in another effort to spite Larry for saying "irasshaimase," the manager refuses to give it back to him, as it has a hotel's name on it. On the way to Hal's father's funeral, Larry's shortcut through the Valley is now filled with traffic and he tells Jeff he does not want to sit through the traffic and he goes back home. Freddy learns of this and uses his eulogy to reveal Larry's actions. On a second date, Larry learns Gabby told his secret about the shortcut. When the two arrive at the restaurant, the chefs yell "irasshaimase" and yell out Gabby's secret as well, causing her to storm off; it was revealed that Hal, who once dated Gabby, was the one who told the chefs the secret. When Larry leaves, he sees that Mr. Takahashi, who is a regular at the restaurant, has stolen his umbrella.
106	6	"Man Fights Tiny Woman"	Jeff Schaffer	Larry David & Jeff Schaffer	November 28, 2021	0.541
Larry and Jeff return to Los Angeles from New York and Larry is uncomfortable when his chauffeuse is a petite woman and does not want her carrying his heavy luggage. Larry is nervous when the roofer that shows up to fix the leak in his roof is obese and is scared about him going up on the roof. After hurting his back carrying the luggage, Larry sees a chiropractor and notices the waiting room is empty. During his session, he notices his tattered underwear when he bends over and wonders if this is the reason he has very few patients. Larry later tells him this and Larry drafts an email for him to send to his patients. Larry learns that Jason, the actor playing "Cliff" on Young Larry is a member of Jews for Jesus and has been trying to convert other people on set; Larry tells him to stop doing so. Jason's sciatica is acting up and Larry recommends his chiropractor. After an incident involving Leon and a phone charger at the house, the roofer trips and falls through the roof, landing on Larry's bed. Larry speaks with Seth Rogen about a possible guest role on Young Larry, but Seth decides not to work with him when he sees a video of Larry fighting with the chauffeur over him not wanting her to carry his luggage again. Back at the chiropractor's office, Larry discovers that Jason has converted him.
107	7	"Irma Kostroski"	Jeff Schaffer	Larry David & Jeff Schaffer & Nathaniel Stein	December 5, 2021	0.423
Larry attends a rally for mayoral candidate Jimmy Mayhew, which Susie is involved in. During a table read for Young Larry, Maria Sofia gives a terrible performance and Larry realizes he has to replace her. Asa, the actor playing young Larry, is very picky about the props being used on set and causes grief for Stan, the prop master. Larry tells Stan to take it easy on Asa because he was sexually abused when he was a younger actor. Stan reveals that Asa's "trauma" was that an older, very attractive actress had sex with him when he was 17 and that he received a $400,000 payout. Larry befriends unpleasant, unattractive city councilwoman Irma Kostroski (Tracey Ullman) after he learns the city council can repeal ordinances; to hopefully change the bylaw for having a fence around your pool, which in turn means he could finally fire Maria Sofia. Larry later goes canvassing with Irma for Mayhew. While waiting in a long line to vote, Larry speaks with a man who is voting for the other candidate and suggests that they just leave because their votes cancel each other. Larry, Susie, Irma and various others attend a gathering at the Mayhew home and the results are announced in which he loses by one vote. Asa reveals to everybody that he saw Larry leave the voting line and everybody begins to angrily approach Larry.
108	8	"What Have I Done?"	Jeff Schaffer	Larry David & Jeff Schaffer	December 12, 2021	0.424
Larry has to recast the role of young Larry for his show. He apologizes to Irma about the election and attempts to make amends with her. Jeff reveals to Larry that he is having an affair with Carly, the assistant for the head of Hulu and is buying body wash that has the same scent as her perfume because Susie would become suspicious if he smelt like her, if not for the body wash. Larry goes on a dinner date with Irma and meets her daughter Deidre where he offends her by criticizing Little Women, which she is a fan of. Larry and Irma have sex, which he does not enjoy. He tells Susie he is only in a relationship with Irma because she could help repeal the ordinance about the five-foot (1.5 m) fence law, so he could finally fire Maria Sofia because her father could no longer extort him. Leon starts a service he calls house husband, in which women hire him to greatly reduce the amount workmen charge them by having them do much less work for them, with the assumption that tradesmen routinely do more work than necessary in order to inflate the cost of their work. Larry buys Irma a gift which includes the same body wash Jeff bought. Larry is invited to Deidre and her husband's 10th anniversary party and during the ceremony, the cameraman (whom Larry previously offended) films the vows and catches Larry acting extremely bored. After discovering the cameraman is also Jewish, the two reconcile and he refilms footage of Larry becoming emotional over the ceremony, which impresses Deidre. Susie sees Jeff acting friendly around Irma, then Susie accuses her of having sex with Jeff because they smell the same, due to the body wash. Leon's clients all soon suffer failures related to the work they had done, because they also needed done the rest of the work that the workmen said they needed to do, but did not do because Leon said it was unnecessary. These failures include a leak at the Greenes. When Susie notices it, she also discovers a second cellphone Jeff has nearby and learns it is Carly, with whom he is having an affair.
109	9	"Igor, Gregor, & Timor"	Jeff Schaffer	Larry David & Jeff Schaffer	December 19, 2021	0.371
Larry keeps mentioning the five-foot fence law to Irma and she tells him she will help to repeal it. In exchange for the favor, Irma wants vaginal rejuvenation surgery. Larry helps an injured bicyclist on the street, putting his sweater on him to keep him warm. When an ambulance takes the injured man with Larry's sweater on, he goes to the hospital to try to retrieve it, annoying one of the receptionists in the process. While at the hospital, Larry speaks with a plastic surgeon about Irma's possible operation and learns if she gets it done, she will not be able to have sex for six to eight weeks, which delights Larry. Jeff attempts to reconcile with Susie over his affair by buying an expensive vase for her. While shopping for it, Jeff and Larry deal with Igor, Gregor, and Timor (all played by Bill Hader) – an owner of antique shop, a concierge, and a restaurant manager, respectively – who all look alike and drive traffic to each other's businesses, but deny they know each other. Irma is undecided about the surgery because of the amount of time afterwards during which she will be unable to have intercourse. Larry has Susie pretend that she has gotten the same surgery and recommends it. After buying the vase, Larry, while driving, sees the cyclist wearing his sweater and stops suddenly, causing the vase to shatter. After seeing Susie's vulva, Irma decides not to have the surgery. Susie lets Jeff off the hook regarding the vase and tells him that she instead wants vaginal rejuvenation surgery.
110	10	"The Mormon Advantage"	Jeff Schaffer	Larry David & Jeff Schaffer	December 26, 2021	0.450
Irma, who is living with Larry, is continually arguing with Leon. Irma tells Larry it is either her or Leon who stays in the house. Leon ends up staying with Jeff and Susie until he leaves for his trip, while Larry still needs Irma to repeal the fence law. In exchange, Susie wants to use Larry's house for a party honoring Alexander Vindman. At a council meeting, Larry speaks with a Mormon named Micah Johnson, the husband of one of the councilwomen, Melinda. Larry questions whether Micah would be interested in multiple wives. At an event held at the Holocaust Museum LA featuring Vindman, Larry ends up ruining his shoes after stepping in dog feces when a man hugs him too close and walks around the event in his socks. At the event, Leon introduces Larry to the Mary Ferguson he is taking on the trip. Larry also notices Micah with another woman. When the event ends, it has begun raining and Larry takes a pair of shoes from the Holocaust exhibit. At the party at Larry's, Mary shows an interest in Vindman. When Melinda discovers what Larry spoke to Micah about, she decides to vote against the repeal. Larry apologizes to Melinda over the phone and promises to make a donation to their church in exchange for a favor. Vindman overhears the conversation and believes it to be a bribe and intends on passing this information to head councilman Weinblatt. Vindman also correctly infers Larry stole the shoes from the exhibit. Irma discovers the shoes Larry stole were actually her grandfather's which causes her to start drinking again after being in recovery. Larry goes to the home of Weinblatt to steal the documents given by Vindman. After getting the documents, Larry flees the house but trips over chairs and falls into their pool. Irma misses the council meeting and causes the vote to be tied, thus the law is not repealed. Meanwhile, Mary steals Leon's passport and instead goes on the trip with Vindman.

=== Season 12 (2024) ===
No. overall	No. in season	Title	Directed by	Story by	Original release date	U.S. viewers (millions)
111	1	"Atlanta"	Jeff Schaffer	Larry David & Jeff Schaffer	February 4, 2024	0.421
Larry has been contracted to go to Atlanta to appear at the birthday party of a wealthy fan, and Maria Sofia, the breakout star of his show, Young Larry, is going as well. Leon tags along and receives a butt-dial from Larry's cell phone. Maria arrives at the airport with her dog, who Leon fat-shames. In Atlanta, the maid at the hotel is upset by the state of Larry's room but he promises to leave her a generous tip. Larry, Maria, and Leon visit Leon's aunt who wrecks Larry's glasses, but due to them having a similar prescription, she loans him a replacement pair. Larry then drops his own glasses into the toilet at the hotel and argues with the maid about who should retrieve them. Later, while cleaning his pants, Larry doesn't notice that he blows a ten-dollar bill into the toilet and the maid assumes it is her tip and grows angry and throws Larry's things out the window. At the party, Larry angers several people and the fan does not want to pay the appearance fee. Larry manages to straighten it out, but when Maria's dog accidentally dials the man's phone number, he overhears Larry talking trash about him. Larry goes to return Leon's aunt's glasses and ends up getting arrested for giving her water while she is in line to vote.
112	2	"The Lawn Jockey"	Jeff Schaffer	Larry David & Jeff Schaffer	February 11, 2024	0.257
Larry is in jail after being arrested for giving water to Auntie Rae in a voting line. He talks with another man, Emmett, who describes issues he is having and Larry suggests he may have a lactose allergy. Larry is released and greeted by a lawyer, Joe, who looks and sounds exactly like Mocha Joe (and is played by the same actor Saverio Guerra). Larry ends up firing him because of the resemblance and his hatred for Mocha Joe. On television, MSNBC is praising Larry and he is garnering praise from public figures and celebrities (Stacey Abrams and Bruce Springsteen). He plans on pleading guilty and avoiding a trial, but Auntie Rae wants him to fight the law. Meanwhile, the Airbnb where Larry, Jeff, and Susie are staying features an offensive lawn jockey. They attempt to get rid of it but break it, angering Susie who does not want to lose the security deposit so Larry, Jeff, and Leon are forced to find another one. With the replacement in the back of Larry's car, they go to visit Auntie Rae's church gathering where she praises Larry. She attempts to give Jeff leftover ribs, but when her nephew goes to put them in the back of the car, the replacement lawn jockey is found, angering everyone. To placate Auntie Rae, Larry pleads not guilty and decides to fight the law.
113	3	"Vertical Drop, Horizontal Tug"	Jeff Schaffer	Larry David & Jeff Schaffer & Justin Hurwitz	February 18, 2024	0.398
Larry, Jeff, Susie, and Leon return from Atlanta. Larry is greeted at the airport by many people who thank him for what he is doing in Atlanta, including actress Sienna Miller. Ted and Cheryl give Susie a puppy as a birthday gift which she adores. Larry goes to a neighbor's house for a memorial service and offends the neighbor by suggesting it isn't as big of a deal because it was only his father-in-law and not his father. The neighbor also wants Larry to help pay for the tree maintenance of his lemon tree which has roots that are causing problems underground. Larry thinks it is ridiculous because he has only taken lemons which have happened to fall into his yard. When the neighbor comes over to collect, the neighbor leaves agreeing to pay the whole bill when Leon's testicles are visible through the leg of his shorts. While golfing, Larry gets in trouble when he steals a tip that the club pro gives during a lesson to Troy Kotsur and then Larry hits Kotsur when using the tip. Later, when the club owner is reprimanding Larry, Larry gets out of trouble by having his testicles show through the leg of his shorts, causing the club owner to excuse Larry because he cannot bear the sight.
114	4	"Disgruntled"	Jeff Schaffer	Larry David & Jeff Schaffer	February 25, 2024	0.317
At the golf club, someone has posted an anonymous open letter with a list of complaints, signing the letter "Disgruntled". The letter angers club owner Mr. Takahashi. In the dining room, Larry dines with Irma and Jeff and Susie where they complain they cannot get breakfast since it is ten minutes past the eleven o'clock cutoff. They manage to convince the waitress to let them order breakfast anyway and Larry has also brought his own organic eggs. The entire dining room is angered when Larry's table gets their breakfast. Jeff admits to Larry that he is "Disgruntled". Larry and Irma go to couples therapy with the wife of a former Seinfeld writer and Larry worries their conversations are being discussed. Jeff worried his conversations with the therapist are being overheard in the next door office by a doctor who is friends with Mr. Takahashi and that he will be outed as "Disgruntled". On the golf course, Mr. Takahashi accuses Larry of being "Disgruntled", but Jeff says it is him and then everyone on the course yells out that they are "Disgruntled". Also, Willie Geist is doing a profile on Larry in light of his actions and trial in Atlanta.
115	5	"Fish Stuck"	Jeff Schaffer	Larry David & Jeff Schaffer & Carol Leifer	March 3, 2024	0.373
Larry meets with his lawyer, Christopher Mantle, who is confident he can get the case against Larry dismissed in Atlanta. Mantle takes a call from his surrogate as he and his husband are having a baby. Larry learns they plan to use his husband's last name, Zeckelman, instead of Mantle and is critical of this decision. Larry still wants to get out of his relationship with Irma but her sponsor is insistent on another eight weeks unless she breaks up with him instead. Larry learns from Lewis that she ended her first marriage due to having to provide long-term care to him and not wanting to go through that anymore. Freddy also wants to get out of his own relationship as his girlfriend works at the Disney Store, not as an executive at Disney as he believed. Larry and Freddy concoct a plan to pretend they have Groat's Disease in order to get the women to leave them, which works until the two women run into each other and discover the deception. Also, a brick at a temple has "Larry David is disrespectful to women" engraved on it. The problem is compounded when individuals affected by the deception contribute additional bricks about Larry's faults.
116	6	"The Gettysburg Address"	Jeff Schaffer	Larry David & Jeff Schaffer	March 10, 2024	0.257
Larry decides to use his time spent in the bathroom learning the Gettysburg Address but in the process conditions himself to have to urinate any time he hears it causing complications when he goes to see Ted Danson and Lori Loughlin in a play about Abraham Lincoln. Larry and Leon get banned from an all-you-can-eat restaurant when Leon eats too much food. Larry goes on a date with Sienna Miller. Larry sponsors Lori Loughlin for membership at the country club and also finds himself being blamed and getting arrested for defacing Susie's billboard for her kaftan business.
117	7	"The Dream Scheme"	Jeff Schaffer	Larry David & Jeff Schaffer & Nathaniel Stein	March 17, 2024	0.427
Larry is woken up at 3:00 am by a call from the wife of a club member who has had a stroke. He is irritated because he does not even know the man well and soon finds himself caught on a text chain with the man's family and also inundated with requests to keep an eye on his daughter if anything happens to him. Larry encourages Jeff to fake a nightmare to get out of going on a flight with Susie.
118	8	"The Colostomy Bag"	Robert B. Weide	Larry David & Jeff Schaffer	March 24, 2024	0.366
Larry's preparations for his upcoming trial are hindered by a valet worker who thinks Larry is a big shot because he throws his keys to the worker. Larry gets into a fight with Susie over some cheese which results in Larry again firing his attorney. Larry also helps Richard buy an old Mercedes and gets into an argument with Conan O'Brien because Richard didn't get Larry clearance to talk to him. Jeff wants to give Larry power of attorney when he has to have back surgery.
119	9	"Ken/Kendra"	Jeff Schaffer	Larry David & Jeff Schaffer	March 31, 2024	0.339
A misunderstanding with Cheryl's masseuse threatens to tarnish Larry's image before his upcoming trial. To try to dispel the negative impact, Larry offers to introduce her to Bruce Springsteen who is in town on tour and wants to meet Larry due to his actions in Atlanta. Larry ends up with COVID which he passes on to Bruce, further threatening Larry's public image.
120	10	"No Lessons Learned"	Jeff Schaffer	Larry David & Jeff Schaffer	April 7, 2024	0.530
In the series finale, Larry faces trial over his actions in Atlanta, mirroring the series finale of Seinfeld.
