= Seinfeld (Curb Your Enthusiasm) =

- Curb Your Enthusiasm episode
- Episode no.: Season 7 Episode 10
- Directed by: Jeff Schaffer (Note: Andy Ackerman directed the Seinfeld segment)
- Story by: Larry David
- Original air date: November 22, 2009
- Running time: 41 minutes

Guest appearances
- Jerry Seinfeld as himself / Jerry Seinfeld; Julia Louis-Dreyfus as herself / Elaine Benes; Michael Richards as himself / Cosmo Kramer; Jason Alexander as himself / George Costanza; Wayne Knight as Newman; Elisabeth Shue as Virginia; Saverio Guerra as Mocha Joe

Episode chronology
← Previous "The Table Read"	Next → "The Divorce"
- Curb Your Enthusiasm season 7

"Seinfeld" is the tenth and final episode of the seventh season of the American situation comedy television series Curb Your Enthusiasm. The 70th overall, the episode was written by series creator and star Larry David and directed by executive producer Jeff Schaffer (with Andy Ackerman directing the Seinfeld segment) and originally aired on HBO on November 22, 2009. The episode revolves around a fictional Seinfeld reunion show featuring the original cast.

== Plot ==
Larry David is hopeful that his plan is working to win back his ex-wife Cheryl (Cheryl Hines). He previously cast her in the Seinfeld reunion show as Amanda, ex-wife of George, played by Jason Alexander. Meanwhile, Julia Louis-Dreyfus holds a party in honor of Jason's book release, Acting Without Acting, which Larry David and Jerry Seinfeld criticize for being too short. At the party, Julia Louis-Dreyfus accuses Larry of leaving a "ring stain" on an antique table in her house. Larry claims his innocence and refuses to pay for the damages, and thus decides to find the person responsible; the person who does not "respect wood."

While on the set of the show, Cheryl invites Larry to her house to review the script. Larry misses the date when he attempts to repair his friendly relationship with Mocha Joe (the studio lot's coffee guy whom Larry failed to tip), causing Cheryl to turn to Alexander for coaching. The two begin to develop a very friendly relationship, leaving Larry jealous. In retaliation, he rewrites the ending of the show, in which George and Amanda do not end up together. This causes Jason to leave the set; when the rest of the cast wants Jason to return, Larry unsuccessfully tries to play George himself, and quits the show shortly thereafter. In the parking lot, Larry talks to Jeff on the phone and mentions that the only reason he had put the show together to begin with was to have a chance to get back together with Cheryl, which she overhears from her car.

Upon watching the show's premiere, Larry is surprised to see that Virginia is in fact playing Amanda. Cheryl then knocks on his door, stating she quit the show after arguing over the small size of Jason's book, and also because "it wasn't the same" since Larry's resignation. Larry states that he prefers the original ending to the one he had written, which causes Cheryl to say "because [George and Amanda] belong together", much like Larry and Cheryl. The two kiss until Larry notices a ring stain caused by Cheryl's drink, subsequently accusing Cheryl of causing the ring stain on the antique table.

=== Reunion show ===
The Seinfeld reunion show centered on George Costanza, who married a woman named Amanda and made a fortune by devising an iPhone application called the iToilet, which directed the user to the nearest decent public toilet anywhere in the world (in "The Busboy", an actual Seinfeld episode, George brags about being able to find "the best public toilet [...] anywhere in the city"). His wife left him before he lost his fortune in the Bernie Madoff Ponzi scheme, and George then moved in with Jerry. In the years since the original finale, Jerry donated sperm to have a daughter with Elaine; the child, unknowingly, calls him "Uncle Jerry", but learns the truth by the end of the episode and eventually calls him "daddy". Most of the reunion show revolves around George attempting to get back with Amanda, who received half of George's money and would want a prenuptial agreement to ensure he did not get together just for the money.

In the episode, Jerry says "we already screwed up one finale", a reference to the fact that "The Finale" was not well received by critics and fans.

== Production ==
David previously refused to make a Seinfeld reunion, but he thought it would be funny to do it on Curb Your Enthusiasm. He stated that it "was a perfect way to do something like that but not to do it. Under the guise of doing the Curb show, it was very relaxed and loose and easy." The original sets were used to reconstruct Jerry's apartment and Monk's Café, with Jerry's apartment updated to reflect the 11 years that had elapsed since "The Finale".

== Reception ==
Eric Goldman of IGN gave the episode a 7.4 saying that "there were quite a few funny moments and scenes" but it "lacked a certain spark and energy and felt fairly low key for a season finale in general". Amelie Gilette of The A.V. Club praised the episode, writing that David "made the Curb universe and the Seinfeld universe merge and then fold in on itself—and it was nothing short of incredible to watch". She graded the episode A+. Jonathan Toomey of TV Squad also gave "Seinfeld" a positive review, saying that "fans finally got the Seinfeld ending they've always been hoping for", though he criticized the subplot with Mocha Joe.

The episode was watched by about 2 million viewers, making it the highest-rated season finale of the show in more than five years.
