= Palestinian Chicken =

- Curb Your Enthusiasm episode
- Larry shrugs his shoulders, unable to decide whether to take the side of the Israelis or the Palestinians.
- Episode no.: Season 8 Episode 3
- Directed by: Robert B. Weide
- Story by: Larry David; Alec Berg; David Mandel; Jeff Schaffer
- Original air date: July 17, 2011
- Running time: 30 minutes

Episode chronology
← Previous "The Safe House"	Next → "The Smiley Face"
- Curb Your Enthusiasm season 8

"Palestinian Chicken" is the third episode of the eighth season of the American sitcom Curb Your Enthusiasm, and the 73rd episode overall. A story by Larry David, in collaboration with Alec Berg, David Mandel, and Jeff Schaffer, and directed by Robert B. Weide, the episode originally aired on HBO on July 17, 2011. In the episode, Larry and Jeff (Jeff Garlin) come across a popular Palestinian restaurant called Al-Abbas Original Best Chicken, whose plan to open a second location next to a Jewish deli outrages Larry's friends, as Larry begins a taboo sexual relationship with an employee of the restaurant, choosing pleasure over politics and alienating those around him.

== Analysis ==
The plot of the episode alludes to the Israeli–Palestinian conflict, and is also considered an "obvious" commentary on the building of a mosque near the New York City 9/11 memorial, as stated by John Sellers of TheWrap.

== Reception ==
"Palestinian Chicken" received critical acclaim and is considered one of the best Curb Your Enthusiasm episodes by critics and fans alike; Variety Magazine and Vulture have both ranked the episode #1 on its list of the best Curb Your Enthusiasm episodes. The A.V. Club rated the episode an "A+" and, as of 2025, holds a 9.3/10 rating on IMDb based on 3,233 reviews. Larry David himself has said that "Palestinian Chicken" is his favorite episode of the series.
