= Larry vs. Michael J. Fox =

- Curb Your Enthusiasm episode
- Michael J. Fox (left) is confronted by Larry (right) in his apartment.
- Episode no.: Season 8 Episode 10
- Directed by: Alec Berg
- Story by: Larry David; Alec Berg; Jeff Schaffer; David Mandel
- Original air date: September 11, 2011
- Running time: 30 minutes

Guest appearances
- Michael J. Fox as himself; Michael Bloomberg as himself; Ana Gasteyer as Jennifer; Eddie Schweighardt as Greg

Episode chronology
← Previous "Mister Softee"	Next → "Foisted!"

"Larry vs. Michael J. Fox" is the eighth season finale of the American television comedy series Curb Your Enthusiasm. The eightieth episode overall, its story was written by series creator Larry David, Alec Berg, Jeff Schaffer, and David Mandel, and it was directed by Berg. It originally aired on HBO in the United States on September 11, 2011, to an audience of 2.04 million viewers.

The series stars David as a fictionalized version of himself, following his life as a semiretired television writer in New York. In the episode, Larry is convinced that Michael J. Fox (himself) is purposefully using his Parkinson's diagnosis to treat him poorly. He schemes to prove this, which only makes his life continuously worse with each attempt. Concurrently, Larry dates a woman, Jennifer (Ana Gasteyer), with a flamboyant son, and she refuses to accept the fact that he might be gay. After being told he loves fashion, Larry gives him a birthday gift that is quickly deemed inappropriate.

David approached Fox with the idea of the episode in 2011, and a reluctant Fox agreed, finding the pitch to be humorous. Michael Bloomberg, former Mayor of New York City, guest starred in the episode as himself. "Larry vs. Michael J. Fox" received mixed reviews from critics, with some feeling it was not a satisfactory conclusion to the already disliked season, while others have called it one of the series' best episodes. Despite the mixed critical reception, it was deemed an instant classic by fans of Curb Your Enthusiasm, as claimed by The Hollywood Reporter. It has received analysis from critics, scholars, and experts on Parkinson's since its airing.

== Plot ==
Semiretired television writer Larry David goes to his girlfriend Jennifer's house for a date, and meets her flamboyant son Greg (Eddie Schweighardt), who sees Larry doodling Hitler onto a magazine, becoming fascinated by the swastika. At their date, Jennifer plays piano at a restaurant when Michael J. Fox greets Larry, who is upset that Fox talked over Jennifer's performance. Later, Larry asks about Greg to Jennifer, who insists that he isn't gay. Learning Greg's birthday party is in a week, Larry agrees to buy him a present. He becomes annoyed upon seeing Fox give him a seemingly disapproving head-shake, but Jennifer informs Larry that Fox has Parkinson's. Larry visits Fox's apartment upstairs to apologize, asking about the head-shake. Fox explains it was his Parkinson's, and offers a soda, which is shaken-up and sprays onto Larry.

Back home, Larry talks to his roommate Leon (J. B. Smoove) about the incident, who also believes it was Fox's Parkinson's. When they later hear loud thumping above, Larry assumes Fox is retaliating, but a visit reveals it is instead Fox's prescribed shoes. For Greg's birthday, Larry gifts a sewing machine, exciting Greg but angering Jennifer, who thinks Larry's encouraging him to be gay. Larry consults with his married friends Susie (Susie Essman) and Jeff (Jeff Garlin), who both advise him to buy another gift. During their conversation, Susie mentions that Fox would take a bullet for his wife, and Jeff insists he would do the same. Fox later pushes Larry at their hotel complex, and Larry reports the incident to the staff, but nobody shows Larry any sympathy. Outraged, he exclaims that Parkinson's should not excuse rude behavior.

At a board meeting, Larry is told that he is on probation for harassing Fox, but can clear it by donating $10,000 to Fox's upcoming fundraiser; he grudgingly accepts. Meeting Jennifer and Susie in the park, Larry unveils his replacement gift—a violin. Soon after, Greg gifts Susie a pillow sham with a swastika design. Furious, Susie yells at Larry just as a cyclist approaches; Jeff leaps in front and is hit, declaring he has taken a bullet for Susie. At the fundraiser, Larry's violin signing to Jeff is misread by Fox as mockery, turning the crowd—including mayor Michael Bloomberg—against him. Banished from New York, Larry and Leon relocate to Paris, where Larry immediately gets into an argument with a Frenchman over parking.

== Production ==
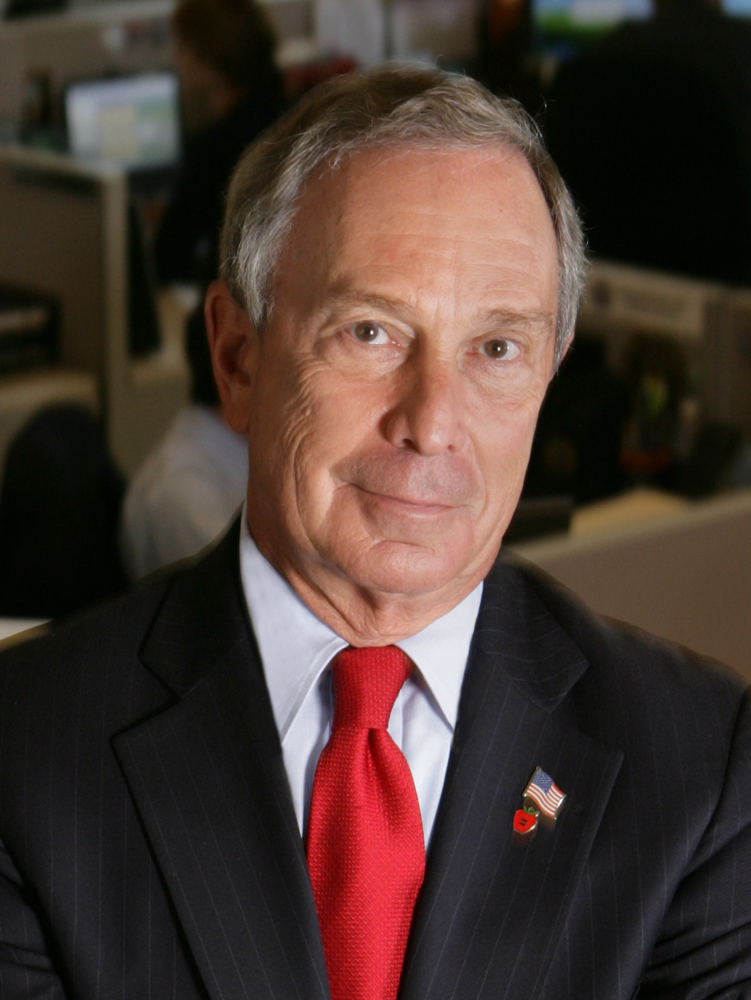
Michael Bloomberg in 2007

"Larry vs. Michael J. Fox" was written by series creator Larry David, Alec Berg, Jeff Schaffer, and David Mandel. Guest stars in the episode include Eddie Schweighardt as Greg and Ana Gasteyer as Jennifer.

In 2011, David called Michael J. Fox, pitching him an idea for an episode of the series revolving around Parkinson's, a disease that Fox himself suffered from. Fox liked the pitch, despite his concern that it could be deemed offensive, and agreed to do the episode. In May, it was officially reported that he was set to guest star on Curb Your Enthusiasm. David described working with Fox as "tremendous", commending him for being open to joke about his Parkinson's. Fox shared a similar sentiment, telling TV Guide in an interview regarding the episode that he thought it was "very funny". Much like the rest of the series, the majority of humor in the episode was improvised, according to J. B. Smoove, who portrays Leon Black on the series. He also revealed some jokes had to be cut from the final broadcast, including a more vulgar version of the joke about Larry being lucky he did not "have a dick in [his] hand" around Fox.

Former mayor of New York Michael Bloomberg guest starred in the episode as himself, aided by Jake Goldman, who works on Bloomberg's advance team, and Aaron Walker, who works for Deputy Mayor Howard Wolfson. He was asked to film the scene on August 27, 2010, the same day he was scheduled to play golf with President Barack Obama. David called Bloomberg, personally asking him to do the filming on that day. He agreed, on the condition that it would be filmed the day prior on August 26, which was also the same day that he appeared on The Daily Show; reports found that he wore the same outfit—a navy suit, a red tie, and a blue dress shirt—on both Curb Your Enthusiasm and The Daily Show. Bloomberg was happy to guest star in the series, as filming for Curb Your Enthusiasm relocated from Los Angeles to New York during the season. He followed a script for the scene, which took five takes to complete, but improvised his line about putting Parkinson's "out of business". Bloomberg was told not to tell anyone of his guest appearance in the episode, and wasn't made aware of its overall narrative to secure the secrecy of his role.

== Themes ==
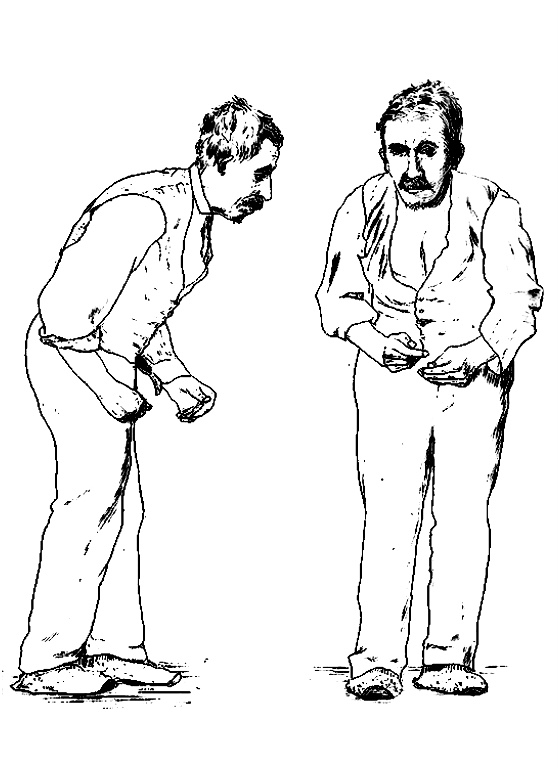
The episode's focus on Parkinson's (illustration pictured) has been called a subversion of comedic expectations.

Analyzing the episode prior to its release, Dr. Cheryl Waters, an expert on Parkinson's, felt the episode was likely going to increase awareness of the disorder, as humor can often help those suffering from illnesses cope. Journalist Sharon Kha, who has Parkinson's herself, felt the episode would be helpful in making Parkinson's patients feel more included, and can "whittle down" any stigma around the disease. Critic Shawn Van Horn of Collider found the episode to be subversive of expectations, not taking the "cruel" approach of using physical comedy to get jokes out of Parkinson's, with Larry treating Fox how he treats any other person. He is treated as a regular human being, one who makes mistakes, and is not given extra sympathy for his disorder. David Slucki, writing for the book Laughter After: Humor and the Holocaust, called Larry giving Greg ideas about Hitler and swastikas an example of how Americans and non-Jewish people deal with topics like the Holocaust, a theme that can even be seen from the first episode of the series, "The Pants Tent", with "Larry vs. Michael J. Fox" giving this theme a natural conclusion.

Commenting on the portrayal of his Parkinson's in the episode, Fox asserted that, when someone has a disability, they have to focus on "your own experience, and everyone else's attitude toward your experience". He felt that "Larry vs. Michael J. Fox" was a way for people with Parkinson's to say that they are comfortable with their disease, and that they are able to deal with it and even acknowledge any humor that comes with it. Jeremy Kinser of The Advocate found Greg's character to be emblematic of the season as a whole, as it was more open to LGBTQ storylines than most. Kinser notes that the episode touches on the taboo topic of homosexuality in children. Author Mark Ralkowski describes the episode as an example of Curb Your Enthusiasm using Larry to make others—both the characters around him and the viewer—feel morally superior; it seems as if the universe is against him and everyone is constantly trying to put him down, and Larry's mistreatment of Fox shows the audience that he oftentimes deserves this.

== Release ==
"Larry vs. Michael J. Fox" first aired on HBO on September 11, 2011. In the United States, the episode was watched by 2.04 million viewers during its original broadcast. It received a 1.0% share among adults between the ages of 18 and 49, meaning that it was seen by 1.0% of all households in that demographic. According to TV by the Numbers, "Larry vs. Michael J. Fox" was one of the highest rated Curb Your Enthusiasm broadcasts in seven years. A teaser for the eighth season released in April, 2011, contained a scene from the episode, with Larry bumping into Fox, onto which a joke about Parkinson's ensues. Another teaser released the following month also showcased Fox's role in the episode. The episode was first released on home video in the United States on June 5, 2012, in the Complete Eighth Season DVD box set.

== Reception ==
The Hollywood Reporter detailed that fans of Curb Your Enthusiasm immediately deemed "Larry vs. Michael J. Fox" to be an instant classic following its airing, with many praising its humor and use of Greg's character. Actress Alison Sweeney called the episode "hilarious" for Fox's role. Bradford Evans of Vulture gave the episode a mixed review, feeling it was missing the aspect of connecting the whole season's arc together, something other Curb Your Enthusiasm season finales often did. Despite feeling it lacked coherence in its narrative, Evans felt the episode's ending gag was a strong way to finish off an otherwise disappointing season. Reacting much more positively to the episode, Meredith Blake, writing for The A.V. Club, found Fox's "self-deprecating" cameo and the humorous scenes with Greg to be among its best aspects. However, he also critiqued the season as a whole for being uneven in quality, feeling the ending could be interpreted as the series "jumping the shark". The Guardian's Paul Owen was equally mixed on the episode, finding the plot around Greg to be humorously over-the-top and describing Fox's storyline to not "always hit the right note" comedically. Owen gave praise towards Leon's line about Larry and Fox being a fair fight as the best moment of the episode.

Dave Nemetz of TVLine listed Larry's feud against Fox as the seventh worst thing he's done on the series, highlighting Larry's accusing of Fox intentionally shaking up a soda can given to him as particularly deplorable. Discussing the nature of the episode, Decider's Kayla Cobb felt it would be potentially controversial if aired later in the series, as, despite the fact that Fox's Parkinson's isn't used as the punchline, it is still mocked, and is the subject of several jokes about shaking throughout the episode. David Canfield of Entertainment Weekly ranked Fox as the best celebrity guest star to cameo in Curb Your Enthusiasm for the episode's humorous handling of a topic like Parkinson's, and for the scenes of Larry's insisting that Fox was deliberately using Parkinson's as an excuse to annoy him.

Devon James of Collider slated "Larry vs. Michael J. Fox" as the ninth best episode of Curb Your Enthusiasm, praising its use of misunderstandings, a common motif of the series, and playing on the contrast between Larry and Fox's personalities. Another Collider writer, Shawn Van Horn, also found the episode to be "brilliant", calling it one of the series' best. Similarly, critic Martin Samuel listed the episode as the ninth best episode of the series, noting that the series has never been kind to its guest stars, and Fox's humor regarding his Parkinson's is called a highlight, along with the Nazi-centered humor in Greg's plot. Another critic, Luc Haasbroek, found the cameo from Fox to be the best guest appearance in all of Curb Your Enthusiasm, mainly for the comedic timing and humor derived from Fox's acting, claiming he put a lot of heart into his performance. At the 64th Primetime Emmy Awards, Fox received a nomination for Outstanding Guest Actor in a Comedy Series; he ultimately lost to Jimmy Fallon for his guest appearance on Saturday Night Live.
