= Theatre shadowing =

Stage acting technique for deaf viewers' understanding

Theater shadowing is a technique used in stage acting in order to allow deaf viewers to understand. A sign language interpreter stands near the actor they are interpreting as their "shadow". Often it only takes two interpreters to shadow an entire performance by switching back and forth between different actors and groups of actors. They are also sometimes required to dance, dress in costume to blend in with the actors, and interact with the actors.

Theater productions at the National Technical Institute for the Deaf often reverse this by having hearing actors shadow deaf actors and voice the signed parts.
