= Jon Glaser Loves Gear =

- Created by: Jon Glaser
- Starring: Jon Glaser; John Hodgman
- Country of origin: United States
- No. of seasons: 2
- No. of episodes: 20

Production
- Executive producers: Jon Glaser; Vernon Chatman; John Lee; Alyson Levy; Dave Becky; David Miner; Richard Korson
- Producer: Daria Scoccimarro
- Running time: 22 minutes
- Production companies: PFFR; Unintelligible Grunt

Original release
- Network: truTV
- Release: October 25, 2016 – March 11, 2019

Jon Glaser Loves Gear is an American mockumentary television series with reality segments that premiered October 25, 2016 on truTV. Hosted by Jon Glaser playing a fictionalized version of himself, the show focuses on the comedian's love of gear and gadgets. It's also the third series created by Glaser that he co-produced with production company PFFR, following Delocated and Neon Joe, Werewolf Hunter.

On May 12, 2017, it was announced that Jon Glaser Loves Gear had been renewed for a second season, which was originally expected to premiere in 2018. The second season aired between January 9 and March 11, 2019.

The series was not picked up for a third season.

== Cast and characters ==
- Jon Glaser as himself
- John Hodgman as the voice of Gear-i
- Steve Cirbus as himself, Jon's 'Spurt (short for gear expert)
- Eva Solveig as herself, also plays Jon's Fake Wife
- Miriam Tolan as Leslie, Jon's Real Wife
- Nadia Dajani as Dr. Ellen Trammell, Jon's therapist
- Eli Tokash as Jon's Son
- Charlie Jones as Jon's Fake Son
- Hope Lauren Richardson as Jon's Fake Daughter
- Wyatt Cirbus as himself, Steve's Son
- Bhavesh Patel as Daniel, a TruTV executive who is in charge of the show
- Greta Lee as the voice of Drone-i Malonie, Steve's drone and Gear-i's love interest (season 2)
- Bowen Yang as Bowen, Jon's son's psychologist and, briefly, Steve's replacement as a 'Spurt (season 2)

== Episodes ==
=== Series overview ===
Season	Episodes	Originally released	
Season	Episodes	First released	Last released
1	10	October 25, 2016	December 21, 2016
2	10	January 9, 2019	March 11, 2019

=== Season 1 (2016) ===
No. overall	No. in season	Title	Directed by	Written by	Original release date	US viewers (millions)
1	1	"Camping"	Andrew DeYoung	Jon Glaser	October 25, 2016	0.167
2	2	"Cycling"	Andrew DeYoung	Jon Glaser	October 26, 2016	0.184
3	3	"Hockey"	Andrew DeYoung	Jon Glaser	November 2, 2016	0.197
4	4	"Dogs"	Andrew DeYoung	Jon Glaser	November 9, 2016	0.183
5	5	"Fishing"	Andrew DeYoung	Jon Glaser	November 16, 2016	0.129
6	6	"Baseball"	Andrew DeYoung	Jon Glaser	November 23, 2016	0.194
7	7	"Surfing"	Andrew DeYoung	Jon Glaser	November 30, 2016	0.185
8	8	"Space"	Andrew DeYoung	Jon Glaser	December 7, 2016	0.103
9	9	"Leisure"	Andrew DeYoung	Jon Glaser	December 14, 2016	0.195
10	10	"Sailing"	Andrew DeYoung	Jon Glaser	December 21, 2016	0.205

=== Season 2 (2019) ===
No. overall	No. in season	Title	Directed by	Written by	Original release date	US viewers (millions)
11	1	"Survival"	Andre Hyland	Jon Glaser	January 9, 2019	0.116
12	2	"Tennis"	Andre Hyland	Seth Sanders & Jon Glaser	January 16, 2019	0.108
13	3	"Football"	Andre Hyland	Kevin Dorff & Jon Glaser	January 23, 2019	N/A
14	4	"Golf"	Andre Hyland	Jon Glaser	January 30, 2019	0.102
15	5	"Basketball"	Andre Hyland	Kevin Dorff & Jon Glaser	February 4, 2019	0.114
16	6	"Road Trip"	Andre Hyland	Seth Sanders & Jon Glaser	February 11, 2019	0.102
17	7	"Photography"	Andre Hyland	Seth Sanders & Jon Glaser	February 18, 2019	0.091
18	8	"Swing Dancing"	Andre Hyland	Kevin Dorff & Jon Glaser	February 25, 2019	0.086
19	9	"Gearing"	Andre Hyland	Jon Glaser	March 4, 2019	0.110
20	10	"Skydiving"	Andre Hyland	Jon Glaser	March 11, 2019	0.080
