= Final Flesh =

2009 American comedy horror film

- Directed by: Ike Sanders
- Written by: Vernon Chatman
- Produced by: Vernon Chatman
- Starring: Melvin; Yvonne; Kesha; Matt; Guy Perry; Tyler
- Production companies: PFFR; Playa's Entertainment; PornForThePeople.com
- Distributed by: Drag City
- Release date: 2009
- Running time: 71 minutes
- Country: United States
- Language: English

Final Flesh is a 2009 American independent post-apocalyptic surreal comedy horror film directed by Ike Sanders, written by Vernon Chatman, and produced by PFFR. The film was made by sending the most deliberately absurd and ridiculous scripts to four different companies that specialize in making custom fetish pornography and having the porn actors act out the scripts, which include plenty of nudity, with short scenes of masturbation being the closest they ever get to pornography. Final Flesh tells a very loose story involving a family who live near ground zero, where a nuclear bomb is scheduled to hit. The film is composed almost entirely of non sequiturs, intentionally designed to be as random and nonsensical as possible.

== Cast ==
- Melvin as Mr. Pollard
- Yvonne as Mrs. Pollard
- Kesha as Pam Pollard

== Reception ==
Response to Final Flesh mostly focused on its one-of-a-kind method of production and its extremely surreal nature. AllMovie describes the production of the film as such: "What's most significant about Final Flesh is not the narrative but how it was produced. Vernon Chatman, co-creator of the TV series Wonder Showzen and Xavier: Renegade Angel, wrote a purposefully absurd and pretentious screenplay about thermo-nuclear doomsday, and then divided it into four acts. Each act was sent to a different independent adult video company, each of which specializes in enacting fetish scenarios submitted by amateurs for a price. Chatman then assembled the four completed segments into Final Flesh, with none of the actors, technicians or directors supposedly the wiser about the satiric nature of the project." Vice stated that Final Flesh "could be Chatman's masterpiece." The A.V. Club asserted that "If it didn’t have a sense of humor, Final Flesh would wind up in an art museum." Tiny Mix Tapes gave Final Flesh 3½ out of 5 stars and stated that the film "does achieve its goal of showing how one man’s fetish—no matter how goofy or scripted—may be another man’s smut."
