= Neon Joe, Werewolf Hunter =

- Created by: Jon Glaser
- Starring: Jon Glaser; Steve Little
- Country of origin: United States
- No. of seasons: 2
- No. of episodes: 10 (list of episodes)

Production
- Executive producers: Jon Glaser; Vernon Chatman; John Lee; Alyson Levy; Steven Ast
- Production location: Palisades, New York
- Running time: 22 minutes
- Production companies: PFFR; Unintelligible Grunt; Williams Street

Original release
- Network: Adult Swim
- Release: December 7, 2015 – May 26, 2017

Neon Joe, Werewolf Hunter is an American television series that originally ran as a five episode mini-series on Adult Swim, created by and starring Jon Glaser. The series originally aired consecutively each night between December 7, 2015 and December 11, 2015. Produced by PFFR, the same production company used for Glaser's other projects Delocated and Jon Glaser Loves Gear. The first season was filmed in and around Palisades, New York.

Glaser stated in a November 2015 interview that the series could go beyond just a mini-series if enough interest is generated. Turner issued a press release on May 12, 2016 confirming that Neon Joe, Werewolf Hunter would be returning for another season.

Season 2 premiered on May 22, 2017, running a new episode each night until its conclusion on May 26, 2017.

== Main cast ==
- Jon Glaser as Neon Joe
- Steve Little as Cleve Menu
- Scott Adsit as Sonny Cocoa (Season 1)
- Steve Cirbus as Sheriff Dalton (Season 1)
- Stephanie March as Mayor Carol Blanton (Season 1)
- Edoardo Ballerini as Vance Dontay (Season 2)
- Godfrey as Plaid Jeff (Season 2)
- Shannon O'Neill as Ashley (Season 2)
- Aleks Shaklin as Yuri (Season 2)
- Dolly Wells as Archibald Scoop (Season 2)

== Series overview ==
Season	Episodes	Originally released	
Season	Episodes	First released	Last released
1	5	December 7, 2015	December 11, 2015
2	5	May 22, 2017	May 26, 2017

=== Season 1 (2015) ===
No. overall	No. in season	Title	Directed by	Written by	Original release date	US viewers (millions)
1	1	"Made Ya Look"	Ryan McFaul & John Lee	Jon Glaser	December 7, 2015	1.13
After a rash of werewolf killings, Neon Joe shows up to Garrity, Vermont, aka "B&B Town USA!" Guest star: Paul Rudd as himself.
2	2	"Neon Nights"	Ryan McFaul	Jon Glaser	December 8, 2015	1.20
Following a suicide attempt, Joe aims to help Cleve overcome his depression by staging a werewolf hunt. Meanwhile, Jane kidnaps Joe in her attempt to resurrect her literary love, Tip Shades.
3	3	"Bark, Bark, Yum, Yum"	Ryan McFaul	Jon Glaser	December 9, 2015	1.18
Neon Joe goes to extreme measures to help Sheriff Dalton forget his past. Sonny is tasked to find out how much Neon Joe knows about Garrity's secret.
4	4	"Dignity Cap"	Ryan McFaul	Jon Glaser	December 10, 2015	1.10
Neon Joe gets an unexpected visitor from his past. Sheriff Dalton helps uncover the truth of Garrity.
5	5	"Not Earth China"	Ryan McFaul	Jon Glaser	December 11, 2015	0.74
After reading the Cybot Book of Knowledge, Neon Joe finally knows the truth and is ready for the big showdown against the Cybots. Guest star: Jim Conroy as announcer.

=== Season 2 (2017) ===
No. overall	No. in season	Title	Directed by	Written by	Original release date	US viewers (millions)
6	1	"Loose Lips, Drink Sips"	John Lee	Albertina Rizzo & Jon Glaser	May 22, 2017	0.85
After retiring from Werewolf hunting, Neon Joe manages Oahu Joe's, a tropical-themed bar. When Neon Joe gets an unexpected visitor from his past, he must resist the temptation to give into his anger. Guest star: Jason Sudeikis as himself.
7	2	"Parenthetical Head Nod"	John Lee	Seth Sanders & Jon Glaser	May 23, 2017	0.91
Neon Joe is sentenced to prison for a crime he didn't commit, the murder of Plaid Jeff.
8	3	"Rules of the Road"	John Lee	Seth Sanders & Jon Glaser	May 24, 2017	0.81
After escaping from prison, Neon Joe finds his way to Vance Dontay while being pursued by Jewish skinheads and the FBI.
9	4	"Walk Away, Friend, Walk Away"	John Lee	Seth Sanders & Jon Glaser	May 25, 2017	0.74
Neon Joe and Vance Dontay make a determined effort to set aside their differences for the greater good, saving the planet Earth.
10	5	"Goodbye, French Fry"	John Lee	Albertina Rizzo & Jon Glaser	May 26, 2017	0.97
After reconciling, Neon Joe and Vance Dontay must team up with Plaid Jeff to save the world from The Cube.

== Ratings ==
Neon Joe, Werewolf Hunter : U.S. viewers per episode (thousands)

Season	Episode number				
Season	1	2	3	4	5
1	1130	1200	1180	1100	740
2	850	910	810	740	970

Audience measurement performed by Nielsen Media Research
