= I Love You, Daddy =

2017 comedy-drama film directed by Louis C.K.

- Theatrical release poster
- Directed by: Louis C.K.
- Screenplay by: Louis C.K.
- Story by: Louis C.K.; Vernon Chatman
- Produced by: Dave Becky; Louis C.K.; Vernon Chatman; Ryan Cunningham; John Skidmore
- Starring: Louis C.K.; Chloë Grace Moretz; Rose Byrne; Charlie Day; Edie Falco; Pamela Adlon; Ebonee Noel; Helen Hunt; John Malkovich
- Cinematography: Paul Koestner
- Edited by: Louis C.K.
- Music by: Robert Miller; Zachary Seman
- Production companies: Circus King Films; Jax Media; PFFR
- Release date: September 9, 2017 (TIFF)
- Running time: 114 minutes
- Country: United States
- Language: English

I Love You, Daddy is a 2017 American comedy-drama film written and directed by Louis C.K. and starring C.K., Chloë Grace Moretz, Rose Byrne, Charlie Day, Edie Falco, Pamela Adlon, Ebonee Noel, Helen Hunt, and John Malkovich. Co-producer Vernon Chatman co-wrote the story with C.K. It is C.K.'s third feature film as a director. He plays television writer and producer Glen Topher, who becomes disconcerted after his teenage daughter (Moretz) takes interest in a much older film director (Malkovich).

The film premiered at the 2017 Toronto International Film Festival on September 9, 2017. Initially scheduled to be released in the United States on November 17, 2017, by The Orchard, the film was dropped following sexual misconduct allegations made against C.K. a week prior to the intended debut. On December 8, 2017, it was reported that C.K. was purchasing the film's global distribution rights back from The Orchard.

== Plot ==
Glen Topher, a successful writer and producer of television dramas based in New York City, informs his ex-wife Aura that their aimless 17-year-old daughter, China, wants to move in with him, presumably because of his wealthy lifestyle. Ralph, Glen's closest friend, insinuates that China spent her spring break in Florida playing sexual games with her classmates. China asks to go back to Florida to meet with the new friends she made there, and while Glen is worried, he agrees. Maggie, Glen's outspoken ex-girlfriend, accuses him of being a bad father for always giving his daughter whatever she wants.

Glen's new television series about nurses is set to air in the fall, but there is no script and no cast yet, much to the chagrin of Glen's nervous production partner Paula. Through the machinations of an agent, famous actress Grace Cullen shows up unannounced at Glen and Paula's production office, seeking the lead role in the show. Grace claims she has always wanted to work with Glen, who is charmed by her. A few days later, Grace invites Glen and China to a party where veteran film director Leslie Goodwin, whom Glen idolizes, is also in attendance. China is initially wary of Leslie due to media reports accusing him of being a pedophile but grows interested in him after they converse.

Glen soon enters into a romantic relationship with Grace, who informs him that Leslie has invited China on a trip to Paris with him and some friends. Glen is appalled, but when he confronts China about it, she is resolute about going. The situation leads Glen to a fight with Grace, and they break up. When China arrives home from Paris, Glen throws her a fancy celebration for her 18th birthday. Haunted by the notion that China may have had sex with the much older Leslie, Glen confronts them with his concerns, resulting in China getting upset with him and moving out of his house.

Months later, Glen is attending the Emmy Awards where Leslie has just received the Best Director award for a show featuring Ralph as its star. Leslie tells Glen that he felt inspired by him to accept doing television work and reveals that China rejected his sexual advances while in Paris. With Maggie acting as an intermediary, Glen meets China at her new job at a department store, where they begin reconciling.

== Cast ==
- Louis C.K. as Glen Topher, a respected television writer and producer
- Chloë Grace Moretz as China Topher, Glen's daughter
- John Malkovich as Leslie Goodwin, a world-renowned film director known for pursuing the company of young girls
- Rose Byrne as Grace Cullen, a popular actress who's Glen's love interest
- Charlie Day as Ralph, Glen's actor friend
- Edie Falco as Paula, Glen's business partner
- Pamela Adlon as Maggie, Glen's ex-girlfriend
- Helen Hunt as Aura, Glen's ex-wife and China's mother
- Ebonee Noel as Zasha, China's best friend
- Albert Brooks as the voice of Dick Welker, Glen and Grace's agent
- Dan Puck as Ramen Ross

== Production ==
Production for the film was fully secret, with C.K. shooting entirely on black and white 35 mm film in June 2017. C.K.'s long-time collaborator Paul Koestner served as the film's cinematographer. The film's score by Zachary Seman and Robert Miller was recorded at Abbey Road Studios in London.

Woody Allen stated in his 2020 autobiography Apropos of Nothing that he and C.K., whom Allen directed in Blue Jasmine (2013), attempted to write and act together in a comedy film. Their attempts to collaborate on a script failed, but C.K. contacted Allen years later offering Allen a role in a film he had written and planned to direct. After reading the script, Allen was shocked that the character he would be playing was a famed film director who was once accused of molesting a child, and is in a romantic relationship with a much younger woman. Allen declined the role, thinking the similarities to the allegations made against him would only play "right into the hands of the yahoos." He states that C.K.'s planned film later became I Love You, Daddy.

== Release ==
The film premiered at the Toronto International Film Festival on September 9, 2017, where distribution rights were bought by company The Orchard for $5 million. It was scheduled to be released on November 17, 2017, in a limited release before opening wide on December 1.

On November 9, The Orchard canceled the New York premiere of the film due to "unexpected circumstances". The Hollywood Reporter reported that a possibly damaging upcoming New York Times story on C.K. was the reason for the cancellation. The Times published the story later in the day, accusing C.K. of sexual misconduct against five women. On November 10, 2017, a week before it was set to be theatrically released, it was pulled from the schedule. Shortly after, international distributors dropped the film and scrapped all release plans.

In December 2017, C.K. was reported to have purchased the film's global distribution rights back from The Orchard. Later that month, piracy group CM8 acquired one of 12,000 screener DVDs of the film and posted it to several torrent file hosting websites. Asked about C.K.'s move to purchase the rights, lead actress Chloë Grace Moretz said in an August 2018 interview with The New York Times that she would prefer the movie "just kind of go away, honestly", adding that "it's devastating to put time into a project and have it disappear". She elaborated the following month that she does not "think that it's a perspective or a story that needs to be told in this day and age, especially in the wake of everything that's come to light". Rose Byrne in an interview stated: "I stand with the women who came forward, I think it will be a while before that film can be seen, and I think that's right."

== Critical reception ==
On review aggregator Rotten Tomatoes, the film has an approval rating of 37% based on 46 reviews, with an average rating of 5.30/10. On Metacritic, the film has a weighted average score of 56 out of 100, based on reviews from 18 critics, indicating "mixed or average" reviews.

The Guardian film critic Peter Bradshaw gave the film a four-star review, calling it a "very funny and recklessly provocative homage to Woody Allen, channelling his masterpiece Manhattan." Variety critic Owen Gleiberman was less positive, writing that "the film meanders, and its second half is shapeless", although he praised the dialogue and cast.
