= At Home with Amy Sedaris =

American television series

- Genre: Surreal comedy
- Created by: Amy Sedaris; Paul Dinello
- Starring: Amy Sedaris
- Composer: Jon Spurney
- Country of origin: United States
- Original language: English
- No. of seasons: 3
- No. of episodes: 30

Production
- Executive producers: Amy Sedaris; Paul Dinello; Cindy Caponera; Alyson Levy; John Lee; Vernon Chatman
- Producers: Jodi Lennon; Ryan Cunningham; Daria Scoccimarro
- Cinematography: Smokey Nelson (S1), Robert Barocci (S2)
- Editor: Christein Aromando
- Camera setup: Single-camera
- Running time: 22 minutes
- Production companies: PFFR (season 1); A24 (season 2–3); Buck Tooth Productions

Original release
- Network: truTV
- Release: October 24, 2017 – July 29, 2020

At Home with Amy Sedaris is an American surreal comedy television series that premiered on October 24, 2017, on truTV. Hosted by Amy Sedaris playing various characters, the show focuses on the comedian's love of entertaining, crafts, and cooking. The series was met with critical acclaim upon its premiere, garnering a nomination for Outstanding Variety Sketch Program at the 70th Primetime Emmy Awards. The series ran for three seasons before its cancellation in 2021.

== Premise ==
At Home with Amy Sedaris follows Sedaris as she demonstrates "her diverse but necessary homemaking skills."

== Cast and characters ==
=== Main ===
- Amy Sedaris as herself, Patty Hogg, Ronnie Vino, Hobo, and Nutmeg

=== Recurring ===
- Heather Lawless as Ruth, the Lady Who Lives in the Woods
- Ana Fabrega as Esther
- Cole Escola as Chassie Tucker
- David Pasquesi as Tony Pugnalata
- Matt Malloy as Leslie Hogg (seasons 2–3)
- Moujan Zolfaghari as Puja
- John Early as Russell Schnabble
- Darrell Hammond as Jacob, Chad Chutney, Colonel Hogg and Radio Voice
- Adam Selman as Hickory, Snake Bite Victim and Choking Man
- Justin Theroux as Colonel Cary Commander, Sea Captain and Hip Guy
- Jackie Hoffman as Murder She Cooked Narrator, Winifred Snood and Peg D'Peeves
- Michael Shannon as Julien Pendrel, Johnny Shannon and Tom Jefferson
- Michael Stipe as himself
- Paul Dinello as Hercules, Barry Teaberry and Jesus (seasons 1–2)
- Callie Thorne as Dr. Claire Shanks and Madge (seasons 1–2)
- Jane Krakowski as herself and Beverly (seasons 1, 3)
- Peter Serafinowicz as Captain Benton Cize and Turtleneck Man (seasons 1, 3)
- Josh Hamilton as Stieger and Dan (seasons 1, 3)
- Talya Mar as Ariel and Loretta Biscuit (seasons 1, 3)
- Rachel Dratch as Florence Chervil and Miss Elva DeFossil (seasons 1, 3)
- Brian Stack as Narrator (season 1)
- Cindy Caponera as Linda Mungus and Cop (season 1)
- Vanessa Walters as Bear and Snowman (season 1)
- Bridget Everett as Teresa and Crystal Dangles (seasons 2–3)
- Paul W. Downs as Lance Henning and Chris Linnseed (seasons 2–3)
- Frederick Weller as Walter and Blaze (seasons 2–3)
- Ana Gasteyer as Darlene Cornish and Colleen (seasons 2–3)
- Richard Kind as Sugar Griz and Lenny (seasons 2–3)
- Christein Aromando as Artemis (season 2)
- Leo Fitzpatrick as Pudge (season 2)
- Jessica Walter as Alice Brittlecrunch (season 2)
- Ann Dowd as Terri Tucker and Janice Shanks (seasons 2–3)

=== Guest ===
- Paul Giamatti as Mr. Olgilvey ("TGIF")
- Todd Barry as Mr. Handley ("TGIF")
- Scott Adsit as Panos Sakos ("Cooking for One")
- Nick Kroll as Randy Fingerling ("Gift Giving")
- Callie Thorne as Dr. Claire Shanks ("Gift Giving")
- John Early as Russell ("Gift Giving")
- Stephen Colbert as himself ("Gift Giving")
- Chris Elliott as Rich Uncle ("Entertaining for Peanuts")
- Jonathan Hadary as Sully ("Nature")
- Christopher Meloni as Ranger Russell Biscuit ("Nature")
- Neil Patrick Harris as himself ("Holidays")
- David Costabile as Clarence ("Holidays")
- Aidy Bryant as Mulaak ("Out of This World")
- Dale Soules as Delta Mung ("Making Love")
- Sasheer Zamata as Ms. Stern ("Making Love")
- Matthew Broderick as Cliff Wilt ("Teenagers")
- Fred Armisen as Maximiliano ("Hospital-tality")
- Juliette Lewis as Taffney Tucker ("Hospital-tality")
- Taryn Manning as Tambi Tucker ("Hospital-tality")
- David Krumholtz as Angelo DiBeverly ("Game Night")
- Susan Sarandon as herself ("Anniversary")
- Ellie Kemper as herself ("Anniversary")
- Janeane Garofalo as herself ("Anniversary")
- Greta Lee as herself ("Anniversary")
- Wade McCollum as Skeleton ("Halloween")
- Billy Crudup as Dr. Raddish ("Halloween")
- Debra Monk as Mrs. Bjornson ("Thanksgiving")
- John Ventimiglia as Sugar Man ("Confectionaries")
- Michael Cera as Travis ("Valentine's Day")
- Jason Sudeikis as himself ("Travel")
- Peter Serafinowicz as Captain Benton Cize ("Travel")
- David Koechner as Clovis ("Outdoor Entertaining")
- Sunita Mani as Denise Hershey Musgrave ("Signature Dishes")
- David Alan Grier as Pippen ("Inspiration")
- Arturo Castro as Castrodamus ("New Year's")
- Paul Rudd as Melisso Junkins ("New Year's")
- Michael McKean as Guy Lombardi ("New Year's")
- Chris Parnell as Chug Ducey ("New Year's")

== Episodes ==
Season	Episodes	Originally released	
Season	Episodes	First released	Last released
1	10	October 24, 2017	December 19, 2017
2	10	February 19, 2019	April 30, 2019
3	10	May 20, 2020	July 29, 2020

=== Season 1 (2017) ===
No. overall	No. in season	Title	Directed by	Written by	Original release date	U.S. viewers (millions)
1	1	"TGIF"	Drake von Sedgewynn	Amy Sedaris, Drake von Sedgewynn, Cindy Caponera, Jodi Lennon, Frank Lesser, & Meredith Scardino	October 24, 2017	0.173
2	2	"Cooking for One"	Drake von Sedgewynn	Amy Sedaris, Drake von Sedgewynn, Cindy Caponera, Jodi Lennon, Frank Lesser, & Meredith Scardino	October 24, 2017	n/a
3	3	"Gift Giving"	Bill Benz	Amy Sedaris, Drake von Sedgewynn, Cindy Caponera, Jodi Lennon, Frank Lesser, & Meredith Scardino	October 31, 2017	0.193
4	4	"Entertaining for Peanuts"	Paul Briganti	Amy Sedaris, Drake von Sedgewynn, Cindy Caponera, Jodi Lennon, Frank Lesser, & Meredith Scardino	November 7, 2017	0.180
5	5	"Grieving"	Bill Benz	Amy Sedaris, Drake von Sedgewynn, Cindy Caponera, Jodi Lennon, & Meredith Scardino	November 14, 2017	0.263
6	6	"Nature"	Peter Lauer	Amy Sedaris, Drake von Sedgewynn, Cindy Caponera, Jodi Lennon, & Meredith Scardino	November 21, 2017	0.165
7	7	"Holidays"	Bill Benz	Amy Sedaris, Drake von Sedgewynn, Cindy Caponera, Jodi Lennon, Frank Lesser, & Meredith Scardino	November 28, 2017	0.177
8	8	"Out of This World"	Peter Lauer	Amy Sedaris, Drake von Sedgewynn, Cindy Caponera, Jodi Lennon, Frank Lesser, & Meredith Scardino	December 5, 2017	0.199
9	9	"Making Love"	Paul Briganti	Amy Sedaris, Drake von Sedgewynn, Cindy Caponera, Jodi Lennon, & Meredith Scardino	December 12, 2017	0.242
10	10	"Murdercide"	Drake von Sedgewynn	Amy Sedaris, Drake von Sedgewynn, Cindy Caponera, Jodi Lennon, & Meredith Scardino	December 19, 2017	0.193

=== Season 2 (2019) ===
No. overall	No. in season	Title	Directed by	Written by	Original release date	Viewers (millions)
11	1	"Teenagers"	Bill Benz	Amy Sedaris, Paul Dinello, Cole Escola, & Allison Silverman	February 19, 2019	0.157
12	2	"Creativity"	Bill Benz	Amy Sedaris, Paul Dinello, Cole Escola, & Allison Silverman	February 26, 2019	0.186
13	3	"All About Amy"	Bill Benz	Amy Sedaris, Paul Dinello, Cole Escola, & Allison Silverman	March 5, 2019	0.153
14	4	"Makeover"	Bill Benz	Amy Sedaris, Paul Dinello, Cole Escola, & Allison Silverman	March 12, 2019	0.102
15	5	"Anniversary"	Bill Benz	Amy Sedaris, Paul Dinello, Cole Escola, & Allison Silverman	March 26, 2019	0.160
16	6	"Halloween"	Paul Dinello	Amy Sedaris, Paul Dinello, Cole Escola, & Allison Silverman	April 2, 2019	0.103
17	7	"Hospital-Tality"	Bill Benz	Amy Sedaris, Paul Dinello, Cole Escola, & Allison Silverman	April 9, 2019	0.129
18	8	"Thanksgiving"	Bill Benz	Amy Sedaris, Paul Dinello, Cole Escola, & Allison Silverman	April 16, 2019	0.131
19	9	"Confectionaries"	Bill Benz	Amy Sedaris, Paul Dinello, Cole Escola, & Allison Silverman	April 23, 2019	0.142
20	10	"Game Night"	Paul Dinello	Amy Sedaris, Paul Dinello, Cole Escola, & Allison Silverman	April 30, 2019	0.128

=== Season 3 (2020) ===
No. overall	No. in season	Title	Directed by	Written by	Original release date	Viewers (millions)
21	1	"Babies"	Ryan McFaul	Amy Sedaris, Edward Keaton, Cole Escola, Jeremy Beiler, Peter Grosz	May 20, 2020	0.140
22	2	"Valentine's Day"	Ryan McFaul	Amy Sedaris, Edward Keaton, Cole Escola, Jeremy Beiler, Peter Grosz	May 27, 2020	0.158
23	3	"Outdoor Entertaining"	Ryan McFaul	Amy Sedaris, Edward Keaton, Cole Escola, Jeremy Beiler, Peter Grosz	June 3, 2020	0.148
24	4	"Easter"	Matt Sohn	Amy Sedaris, Edward Keaton, Cole Escola, Jeremy Beiler, Peter Grosz	June 10, 2020	0.155
25	5	"Travel"	Edward Keaton	Amy Sedaris, Edward Keaton, Cole Escola, Jeremy Beiler, Peter Grosz	June 17, 2020	0.133
26	6	"First Dates"	Anu Valia	Amy Sedaris, Edward Keaton, Cole Escola, Jeremy Beiler, Peter Grosz	June 24, 2020	0.111
27	7	"Dips and Dunkers"	Ryan McFaul	Amy Sedaris, Edward Keaton, Cole Escola, Jeremy Beiler, Peter Grosz	July 8, 2020	0.160
28	8	"Signature Dishes"	Matt Sohn	Amy Sedaris, Edward Keaton, Cole Escola, Jeremy Beiler, Peter Grosz	July 15, 2020	0.096
29	9	"Inspiration"	Bill Benz	Amy Sedaris, Edward Keaton, Cole Escola, Jeremy Beiler, Peter Grosz	July 22, 2020	0.106
30	10	"New Year's"	Bill Benz	Amy Sedaris, Edward Keaton, Cole Escola, Jeremy Beiler, Peter Grosz	July 29, 2020	0.136

== Production ==
=== Background ===
Sedaris grew up in the 1960s and 1970s in Raleigh, North Carolina and learned to cook at a young age. She frequently watched local hospitality shows like WTVD's At Home with Peggy Mann and WRAL's The Bette Elliott Show. These shows inspired the initial concept of the show. Describing Mann's influence, Sedaris has said, "She would do cooking and crafting, and she would have local people on to talk about their businesses. It was very boring and I was obsessed with Peggy Mann. I liked the idea of pretending you had a show happening in your home." She also researched entertainers like Lawrence Welk and Dinah Shore, as well as vintage educational programs and public access shows, which served as inspiration for the specific tone and off-kilter sensibility of the series.

Sedaris had conceived the show many years earlier and eventually developed it into a satire on various famous homemakers including Martha Stewart.

=== Development ===
On January 14, 2017, it was announced during the Television Critics Association's annual winter press tour that TruTV had given the production a series order for a first season consisting of ten episodes. Executive producers were set to include Amy Sedaris, Paul Dinello, Alyson Levy, John Lee, and Vernon Chatman. Production companies involved with the series were slated to consist of PFFR.

On April 18, 2018, it was announced that truTV had renewed the series for a second season consisting of ten episodes with A24 joining the series as an additional production company. On December 11, 2018, it was reported that the second season would premiere on February 19, 2019.

On April 23, 2020, it was announced that the third season would premiere on May 20, 2020. On January 19, 2021, TruTV canceled the series after three seasons.

=== Casting ===
Alongside the initial series order announcement, it was confirmed that the series would star Amy Sedaris. On December 11, 2018, it was announced that guest stars in the second season would include Rose Byrne, Matthew Broderick, Justin Theroux, Susan Sarandon, Ann Dowd, Gillian Jacobs, Juliette Lewis, Ellie Kemper, Fred Armisen, Michael Shannon, Martha Plimpton, Jessica Walter, Campbell Scott, Billy Crudup, Bridget Everett, Julie Klausner, Paul W. Downs, Janeane Garofalo, Richard Kind, Thomas Lennon, David Krumholtz, Ana Gasteyer, Darrell Hammond, Jackie Hoffman, John Early, James Monroe Iglehart, and Matt Malloy.

== Release ==
=== Marketing ===
On July 27, 2017, a clip from the first season was released featuring Jane Krakowski. On September 22, 2018, a trailer for the first season was released. On December 13, 2018, a series of still images from the second season were released. On January 18, 2019, a trailer for the second season was released.

=== Premiere ===
On September 22, 2017, the series held its world premiere during the 1st Annual Tribeca TV Festival in New York City. Following a screening, a discussion moderated by Andy Cohen was held with Amy Sedaris and Paul Dinello. October 23, 2017, the series held another screening during the 13th Annual New York Television Festival in New York City. Following the screening, a conversation was held with Amy Sedaris.

== Reception ==
=== Critical response ===
The series was met with a positive response from critics upon its premiere. On the review aggregation website Rotten Tomatoes, the first season holds a 100% approval rating with an average rating of 8.25 out of 10 based on 15 reviews. The second season holds a 100% approval rating based on 5 reviews. Metacritic, which uses a weighted average, assigned the series a score of 82 out of 100, based on 5 critics, indicating "universal acclaim".

In a positive review, Verne Gay of Newsweek gave the first season three and a half stars out of four and commented, "Sedaris remains, as ever, hilarious, inventive, unbalanced and deeply, joyously, shamelessly twisted. Her new show's not bad either. At Home With Amy Sedaris is each of those [The Frugal Gourmet, Barefoot Contessa, Paula's Home Cooking, and 30 Minute Meals], on acid." Danette Chavez of The A.V. Club praised the series saying, "Sedaris has an earnest desire to share her unique brand of hospitality. What she mixes up here is cozy and kooky, with a side of depravity." James Poniewozik of The New York Times said in positive review that, "each episode is a self-contained distillation of Ms. Sedaris's talents and HGTV-meets-Adult-Swim sensibility. Even in an age of oddball TV experiments, there really is no place like At Home."

=== Awards and nominations ===
Year	Award	Category	Nominee(s)	Result	Ref.
2018	Primetime Emmy Awards	Outstanding Variety Sketch Series	At Home with Amy Sedaris	Nominated	
2019	Writers Guild of America Awards	Comedy/Variety Sketch Series	Cindy Caponera, Paul Dinello, Jodi Lennon, Meredith Scardino & Amy Sedaris	Nominated	
2019	Primetime Emmy Awards	Outstanding Variety Sketch Series	At Home with Amy Sedaris	Nominated	
2019	Primetime Emmy Awards	Outstanding Production Design for a Variety, Reality or Competition Series	Jason Singleton, Naomi Munro & Kim Fischer (for "Teenagers")	Nominated	
2020	Primetime Emmy Awards	Outstanding Production Design for a Variety, Reality or Competition Series	Jason Singleton, Katy Porter & Naomi Munro (for "Outdoor Entertaining" and "Travel")	Nominated	
2021	Writers Guild of America Awards	Comedy/Variety Sketch Series	Jeremy Beiler, Cole Escola, Peter Grosz & Amy Sedaris	Won	
