= The Shivering Truth =

American adult animated series

- Genre: Adult animation; Anthology; Black comedy; Comedy horror; Dark fantasy; Surreal comedy
- Created by: Vernon Chatman
- Written by: Vernon Chatman
- Directed by: Vernon Chatman; Cat Solen
- Voices of: (Complete list)
- Narrated by: Vernon Chatman
- Ending theme: "Long Lankin" performed by various
- Composer: Heather Christian
- Country of origin: United States
- Original language: English
- No. of seasons: 2
- No. of episodes: 12 (and 1 pilot)

Production
- Executive producers: Vernon Chatman; Alyson Levy; John Lee; Cat Solen; Lourri Hammack (Note: Executive Producer for HouseSpecial, season two only); Kirk Kelley; Alvaro Cubillas; Keith Crofford (Note: Executive Producer for Williams Street); Mike Lazzo
- Producers: Alex Bulkley (Note: season one only); Corey Campodonico; Ryan Cunningham; Rebecca Bowen (Note: season two only)
- Cinematography: Mark Elfert (Pilot); Tarin Anderson and Drew Fortier (Series)
- Editors: Jon Philpot; Kira Ablak
- Running time: 11 minutes
- Production companies: ShadowMachine (season one); HouseSpecial (season two); PFFR; Williams Street

Original release
- Network: Adult Swim
- Release: May 22, 2018 – June 14, 2020

The Shivering Truth is an American adult animated comedy horror anthology television series created by Vernon Chatman for Cartoon Network's nighttime programming block Adult Swim. Each episode consists of two or three loosely connected surreal stories presented as warped parables narrated by Chatman. The show, which utilizes stop motion animation, was directed by Chatman and Cat Solen, and produced by Solen with PFFR and ShadowMachine.

The pilot episode of The Shivering Truth was released online on Adult Swim's website on May 22, 2018, ahead of the show's premiere on Adult Swim itself on December 10 of that year. In November 2019, Adult Swim renewed the series for a second season, which premiered on May 10, 2020.

== Overview ==
When announced in a press release by Adult Swim in May 2017, The Shivering Truth was described as "a delicately crafted, darkly surreal anthology comedy, a miniature propulsive omnibus cluster bomb of painfully riotous daymares all dripping with the orange goo of dream logic. A series of loosely-linked emotional parables about stories within tales that crawled out of the deepest caverns of your unconscious mind and became lovingly animated in breath-slapping stop motion – in other words, it is the TRUTH".

== Development ==
The characters in the show are 10-inch (250 mm) puppets with wire-based armatures, created with silicone, wool, polystyrene, and resin. Chatman stated that around six months of physical production, a month of recording, and 2 1/2 months of post-production were needed to complete six episodes. Chatman has noted several inspirations for his work on the show, including Terry Gilliam's work on Monty Python's Flying Circus, stating that "I saw it when I was very young, so it scared me. I didn't know when the animation was beginning or ending." He also explained that "A lot of my influences are non-animated, primarily in short films, novels, even radio shows. A recent one is David Eagleman's books on the brain. He's a neuroscientist and he gives you 40 different versions of the afterlife, and none of them can co-exist." Solen has spoken on her inspirations as well, saying that "I loved the movie The Wizard of Speed and Time, which is a cautionary tale about making movies. Another film that I loved as a kid was Nicolas Roeg's [film] adaptation of Roald Dahl's The Witches, which featured both Anjelica Huston and Jim Henson's puppets. It scared me so much!"

== Cast ==
Season 1

- Vernon Chatman as the narrator
- Janeane Garofalo as Mrs. Lawson / Iris Beekoh / 911 Operator
- Kevin Breznahan as Roommate / Mr. Glimmer / Doug Dwyer
- Trey Parker as Sgt. Pat Mounder / General / Doctor
- Miriam Tolan as Mrs. Glimmer / Insecurity System Machine
- Michael Cera as Delmer Gibbons
- Jonah Hill as Useful Suicidal Man
- Starlee Kine as Blind Girl
- Richard Steven Horvitz as Hand Salesman
- Julio Torres as Dale
- Zack Pearlman as Exploding Prisoner / Neil Lem / Mary / Benny's Wound
- Ivy Chatman as Trudy Glimmer
- Zadie Chatman as Young Dale / Benny Beekoh / Pauly Dindin
- Maria Bamford as Elderly Woman
- Conner O'Malley as Pvt. Ray Pontle
- Nicole Rodenburg as Panties Saleswoman
- John Reynolds as Mr. Lawson
- Andy Daly as Angus Dindin
- David Cross as Prisoner 72301 / Armed Rebel
- Martha Plimpton as Nurses
- Peter Serafinowicz as Lyle Darpi / Charleston
- Jordan Peele as Prison Guard

Season 2

- Vernon Chatman as the narrator / Demon / Doctor
- Kate Berlant as Lily Liblin
- Mike Birbiglia as Hank Alto / Prayer Jacker
- Wyatt Cenac as Dr. Ton Bntu
- Julia Davis as Dr. Lynnert
- Robert Kelly as Eban Dylfyl
- Josh Ruben as Mr. Lombadi / Buddhist Monk
- Dalya Knapp as Gretchen
- Kristen Dodson as Braille Ghost / Goo Narrator
- Chris Elliott as Slab
- Will Forte as Dustin Okus / Creepy Eye
- Josh Gad as Divided Guy
- Miranda July as Grace
- Cole Escola as Ike
- Zadie Chatman as Birthday Kid
- Ivy Chatman as Birthday Kid
- Rachel Butera as Friend / Mom Doll / Holly Inglet
- Dasha Nekrasova as Mrs. Minugm
- Joseph Sikora as Hunky Messiah / Dad
- Desus Nice as Electronics Store Employee
- Jason Mantzoukas as Clive
- Kyle Mooney as Gil Minugm
- Griffin Newman as Fred Lombadi
- Timothy Levitch as Dr. Bodgey
- Ego Nwodim as Rosa
- Alia Shawkat as Amy Liblin
- Tierra Whack as Bully
- Kyle Beltran as Jay Reese
- David Pasquesi as Love Doll Salesman
- Kate Micucci as Sheila Sherma

== Music ==
The song played during the closing credits is usually some version of the old English ballad Long Lankin. The music is often distorted in some way and usually begins near the end of the ballad, at the lines "There's blood in the kitchen, there's blood in the hall / There's blood in the parlour where my lady did fall." The original score is by Heather Christian.

== Episodes ==
=== Series overview ===
Season	Episodes	Originally released	
Season	Episodes	First released	Last released
Pilot		May 22, 2018	
1	6	December 9, 2018	December 23, 2018
2	6	May 10, 2020	June 14, 2020

=== Pilot (2018) ===
No. overall	No. in season	Title	Original release date	Prod. code	U.S. viewers (millions)
—	—	"Chaos Beknownst"	May 22, 2018	000	0.502
The tales of a blind girl from middle school, an unconventional suicide hotline operator and the butterfly effect taken to its logical conclusion.

=== Season 1 (2018) ===
No. overall	No. in season	Title	Original release date	Prod. code	U.S. viewers (millions)
1	1	"The Nurple Rainbow"	December 9, 2018	TST101	0.616
The tales of kinky roommates, the greatest peek-a-boo player the world has ever known, chicken blood infusions and an unproductive office worker who learns to love himself.
2	2	"The Magmafying Past"	December 9, 2018	TST102	0.536
The tales of a boy who builds a church and the intertwined lives of a private, sergeant and single woman.
3	3	"Ogled Inklings"	December 16, 2018	TST103	0.601
The tales of a prison in a desert, an amnesiac man who caused a car accident and the world's greatest poet.
4	4	"ConstaDeath"	December 16, 2018	TST104	0.546
The tales of escapism between a slave and his master, a man afflicted with perpetual death and a couple's neglected son.
5	5	"Tow and Shell"	December 23, 2018	TST105	0.717
The tales of a helpful 9-1-1 dispatcher and a boy who brought a conch shell to show-and-tell.
6	6	"Fowl Flow"	December 23, 2018	TST106	0.630
The tales of a man with a severed, human hand and a man and woman's insecurities.

=== Season 2 (2020) ===
No. overall	No. in season	Title	Original release date	Prod. code	U.S. viewers (millions)
7	1	"The Burn Earner Spits"	May 10, 2020	TST202	0.706
The tales of prayer in a new Age of Miracles, a television possessed by a dead girl and a skeptical and self-righteous cashier.
8	2	"Carrion My Son"	May 17, 2020	TST203	0.617
The tales of a new Messiah, a date for brunch and custom sex dolls.
9	3	"Nesslessness"	May 24, 2020	TST204	0.600
The tales of a shy girl, a panhandler's encounter with a woman and a neurotic firefighter.
10	4	"Beast of Both Worlds"	May 31, 2020 (Note: This episode had an advanced stealth premiere on April 1, 2020 as part of Adult Swim's annual April Fools' stunt.)	TST201	0.345
The tales of a man with terminal goofiness, God within a flower, unrequited love and crippling gloom.
11	5	"The Diff"	June 7, 2020	TST205	0.375
The tales of compatible cities, a child committed to perpetual tripping in order to save face and a man with a split personality.
12	6	"Holeways"	June 14, 2020	TST206	0.508
The tales of a trip to the dentist, a magician who discovered a new type of meat and a man's emptiness.

== Release ==
The pilot episode premiered on the Adult Swim website on May 22, 2018. Before the television premiere on December 10, 2018, Adult Swim created an "online scavenger hunt" by releasing all six episodes on multiple websites and platforms.

In June 2020, the series was uploaded to subscription video on demand streaming service HBO Max, with the exception of the episode "Ogled Inklings", which was intentionally excluded due to a scene where a woman gives birth to a child wearing a peaked policeman's cap, whom the doctor refers to as "a dirty pig". This ban took place due to the then-ongoing George Floyd protests and rising prominence of the Black Lives Matter movement, with an Adult Swim representative stating that "When Adult Swim transitions series to a new platform we determine what episodes are selected through creative and cultural filters and our standards and practices policies. Oftentimes these decisions are made in collaboration with the show's creator". Similar action was also taken against episodes of The Boondocks and an episode of Aqua Teen Hunger Force.

== Reception ==
Daniel Kurland of Den of Geek praised the pilot along with the subsequent first episodes to premiere, giving the show a score of 5/5 and calling it "straight up one of the best things that I've ever seen in my life". Jonathan Barkan of Dread Central called the show "pure nightmare fuel genius", writing that it "looks like the cast aside baby of Charlie Kaufman and Wes Anderson ... it's packed full of absurdist humor, the kind of stuff that you will watch and not be sure if you should laugh, wince, or look at your friends and ask, 'What the fuck?'" Dave Trumbore of Collider wrote that "It's not often you get to put this level of artistry and insanity on display on an international television network", and that "You'll definitely laugh while watching The Shivering Truth, but there's just as good a chance that you'll throw up a bit, too".

== See also ==
- Jam (TV series), a similar comedy-horror sketch series
- The House (2022 film)
- Anomalisa
