= John Lee (producer) =

American television producer (born 1972)

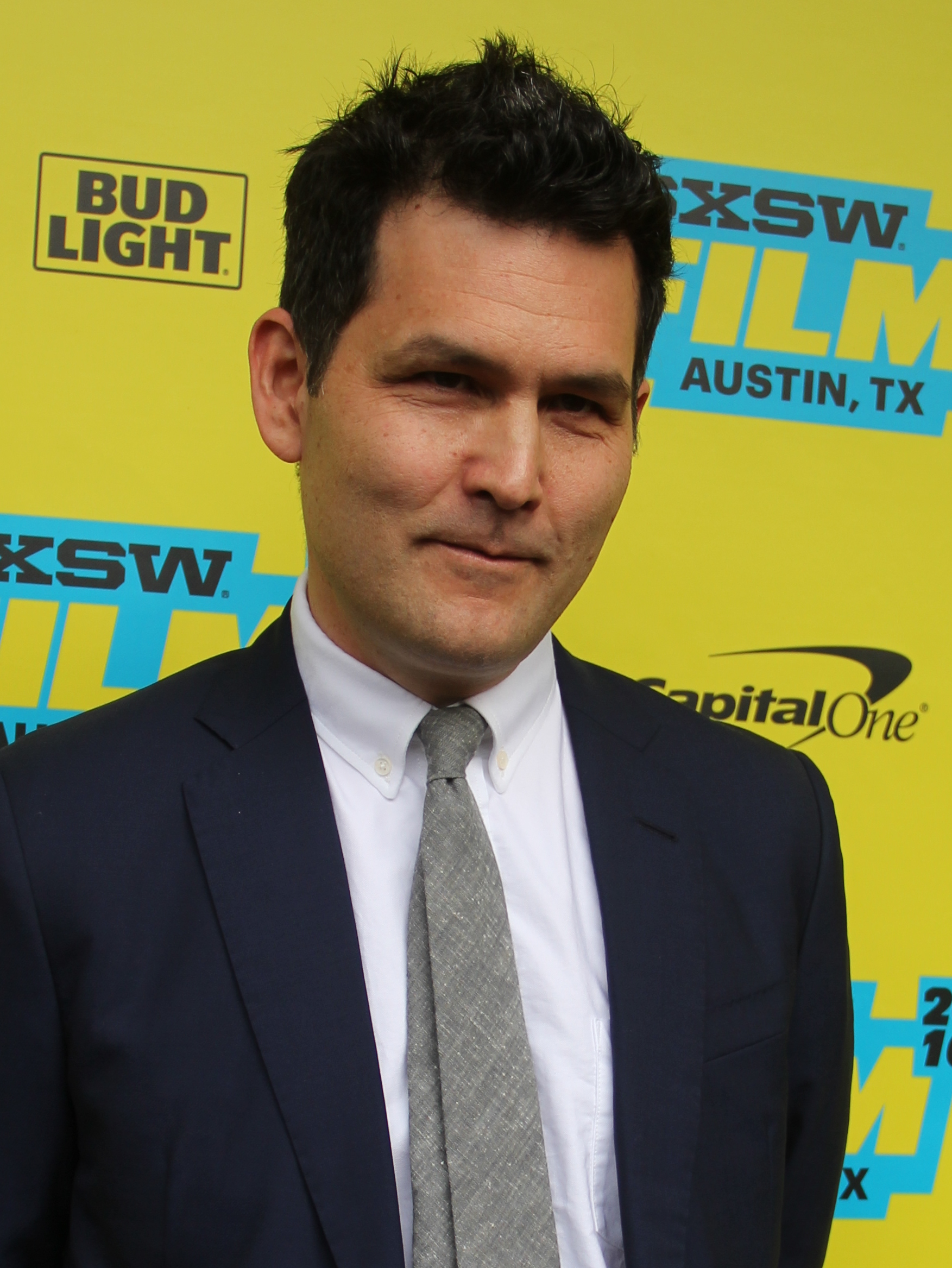
- Lee at the premiere of Pee-wee's Big Holiday at SXSW 2016
- Born: John Michael Lee; Portland, Oregon
- Occupations: Television producer, writer, director, voice actor, musician
- Spouse: Alyson Levy

John Michael Lee is an American television producer, writer, director, voice actor, and musician best known for his work on the MTV2 comedy series Wonder Showzen as a member of the rock band/art collective PFFR.

== Career ==
Lee is of Chinese ancestry and is long time friends with fellow PFFR member and television producer Vernon Chatman. They met as undergraduates at San Francisco State University. Along with Chatman, Lee is the co-creator, writer, director and star of Wonder Showzen. He voices Wordsworth, one of the main puppet characters and provides various other voices on the show. The pair also co-created Snoop Dogg's 2002 MTV sketch show Doggy Fizzle Televizzle. In addition, Lee is the co-creator of Xavier: Renegade Angel, also with Alyson Levy, Chatman and Jim Tozzi. He also worked as a creative consultant on the Adult Swim series Superjail! in 2009. In 2011, Lee, Levy and Chatman created the Adult Swim mini-series The Heart, She Holler starring Patton Oswalt and Kristen Schaal.

Lee was a member of the now defunct rock trio Muckafurgason. Although his primary role in the band was the bassist, the members of Muckafurgason were often known to "play musical chairs" with their instruments, seeing Lee occasionally turn his hand to lead vocals, guitar and even clarinet. Through Muckafurgason he became acquainted with the band They Might Be Giants, who wrote the song "John Lee Supertaster" about him.

Lee was the director and executive producer of the Adult Swim series Delocated and Neon Joe: Werewolf Hunter season 2 starring Jon Glaser. In 2011, Lee began directing segments for the Comedy Central series Jon Benjamin Has a Van. He also directed the pilot of Inside Amy Schumer and several episodes of Broad City.

Lee's directorial debut was the 2016 Pee-wee Herman comedy film Pee-wee's Big Holiday. Afterwards, in 2019, he created another CGI show with Kytten Janae in the pilot Di Bibl for Adult Swim. He later then directed the 2021 horror film False Positive.

== Filmography ==
Year	Title	Director	Writer	Producer	Executive producer	Actor	Role	Notes
1997	Life In a Blender: Chicken Dance	Yes	No	No	No	No		Music Video
2002	Late Friday	No	No	No	No	Yes	Himself	Muckafurguson (Band)
2002-2003	Doggy Fizzle Televizzle	No	Yes	No	Yes	No		Also creator
2005-2006	Wonder Showzen	Yes	Yes	Yes	Yes	Yes	Him / Wordsworth / Various characters	Also creator
2007-2009	Xavier: Renegade Angel	Yes	Yes	Yes	Yes	Yes	Various characters	Also creator
2009-2013	Delocated	Yes	No	No	Yes	No		
2010	Food Party	Yes	No	No	No	No		
2011	Neon Knome	No	No	No	Yes	No		Later reworked into The Problem Solverz which he wasn't involved in
2011	Jon Benjamin Has A Van	Yes	No	No	No	No		
2011-2014	The Heart, She Holler	Yes	Yes	Yes	Yes	Yes		Also creator
2013	Inside Amy Schumer	Yes	No	No	No	No		
2014	Broad City	Yes	No	No	No	No		
2015	Neon Joe, Werewolf Hunter	Yes	No	No	Yes	No		
2016	Pee-Wee's Big Holiday	Yes	No	No	No	No		
2016	Gigglefudge, U.S.A.	Yes	Yes	No	Yes	No		
2017	At Home with Amy Sedaris	No	No	No	Yes	No		
2018	The Last O.G.	Yes	No	No	No	No		
2018-2020	The Shivering Truth	No	No	No	Yes	No		
2018	Hunky Boys Go Ding-Dong	No	No	No	Yes	No		
2019	Di Bibl	Yes	Yes	No	Yes	No		Also creator
2020	Rate the Cookie	No	No	No	Yes	No		
2021–2022	Search Party	Yes	No	No	No	No		7 episodes
2021–2023	Teenage Euthanasia	No	No	No	Yes	Yes	Goat / Crocodile Grandfather / Various Sweet Creamers Players	10 episodes as actor; 17 episodes as executive producer
2021	False Positive	Yes	Yes	Yes	No	No		
2022	Flatbush Misdemeanors	Yes	No	No	No	No		
2023	Ballmastrz: Rubicon	No	No	No	Yes	No		
2024	Interior Chinatown	Yes	No	No	No	No		2 episodes
