= The Heart, She Holler =

American television series

- Genre: Soap opera Southern Gothic; Satire; Surreal humor Comedy horror
- Created by: Vernon Chatman; John Lee; Alyson Levy
- Starring: Patton Oswalt; Amy Sedaris
- Country of origin: United States
- No. of seasons: 3
- No. of episodes: 28

Production
- Running time: 11 minutes
- Production companies: PFFR; Williams Street

Original release
- Network: Adult Swim
- Release: November 6, 2011 – December 11, 2014

The Heart, She Holler is an American horror comedy television series created by Vernon Chatman and John Lee from PFFR for Cartoon Network's nighttime programming block Adult Swim. The series premiered on November 6, 2011 and ended on December 11, 2014, with a total of 28 episodes over the course of 3 seasons.

== Plot ==
The series, described as "Southern Gothic drama" and "an inside-out blend of soap opera and politically incorrect surrealist comedy", is about the long-hidden and isolated son of the Heartshe dynasty (Patton Oswalt) returning to run the town and being locked in conflict with sisters Hurshe (Kristen Schaal and Amy Sedaris) and Hambrosia (Heather Lawless).

== Characters ==
=== The Heartshe family ===
- Hurlan Heartshe (Patton Oswalt) – Secret son of Hoss Heartshe, hidden away "since the minute he was born" in a cave, where he lived for 40 years without any human contact, nor ever seeing the light of day, until he is brought out to run the town of Heartshe Holler. Of his character, Oswalt said "I thought of Kaspar Hauser. That was my model – lethally nonjudgmental of the world to himself, that he trusts everything's going to be awesome." In season 3, Hurlan is killed by the townspeople.
- Hurshe Heartshe (Kristen Schaal – season 1; Amy Sedaris – season 2–3) – Psychotic, vindictive, oversexed sister to Hurlan and Hambrosia. Endlessly plotting to take over the town from Hurlan. It is established in Season 2 that Hurshe was actually married, but her husband is in jail; they had a son and a daughter but she did not bother naming them and keeps them in a secret compartment under her bed, echoing the childhood of their uncle Hurlan.
- Hambrosia Heartshe (Heather Lawless) – Hurlan's other sister, who possesses telekinetic and mind-reading powers. She is also trying to take over the town and/or kill her sister. Very religious and married to the town sheriff, she was "born without lady parts", although she carries on an affair with severed ectoplasmic hands.
- Sheriff (Joseph Sikora – season 1–2; Scott Adsit – season 3) – The corrupt, generally incompetent sheriff of Heartshe Holler, he is married to Hambrosia and in love with her sister Hurshe after seeing her hang herself.
- "Boss" Hoss Heartshe (Jonathan Hadary) – The leader, founder, and owner of the Town of Heartshe Holler who died at the beginning of the series after working tirelessly on his extensive video will in which he leaves Hurlan his fortune and full control of the Holler. He appears in every episode through this video will, which he uses to teach and guide Hurlan. He is resurrected in the last episode of the first season when his corpse and living will are posthumously sentenced to "re-death" in the electric chair, but is deceased again in the following seasons which take place in an alternate reality.
- "Meemaw" Virginia Dare (Judith Anna Roberts) – The matriarch of Heartshe Holler, and the bearer of the curse of Heartshe, being unable to die – though Boss Hoss reveals at the end of Season 1 that the real secret curse is that she can die, through unspecified means, and if she does it will result in the destruction of Heartshe Holler. It is explained in Season 2 that most if not all of the bizarre incidents which occur in the Holler are due to Meemaw's psychic control, which she uses to play twisted games with the inhabitants of the town for her own amusement. For example, Hurshe's affair with her own sister's husband was largely encouraged by Meemaw's psychic influence. Hambrosia may have inherited her psychic powers from Meemaw, but it is unclear which of them is stronger. In the Season 2 finale, Meemaw's real name is first given as "Virginia Dare", and in Season 3 it is confirmed that she is the actual Virginia Dare, "the first white person born on this continent". Her birth so offended the gods of the indigenous peoples that she was cursed.

=== Townsfolk ===
- "Doc" (Kevin Breznahan) – The town's doctor, formerly an auto mechanic. He's also quite a skilled plumber.
- The Reverend (Leo Fitzpatrick) – The immoral and cowardly religious leader of the town. Formerly a criminal named "Psycho Mike"
- Cutter (Michael Laurence) – A sleazy handyman who was Boss Hoss's right-hand man and enforcer. He did the dirty work of reining in anyone who challenged Hoss's control of the town. In his video will, Hoss says that over the years he came to think of Cutter as the son he never had – only to then bluntly denounce that Cutter is not of course his son, and therefore he doesn't need to give him any inheritance, leaving Cutter emotionally devastated. Cutter also occasionally has flashbacks about all of the victims he killed.
- Jacket (David Cross) – an overweight redneck who always wears shirts bearing the Confederate flag. He runs the bar section of the town's combined bar/convenience store, along with his wife Direne. Jacket and Direne first appear in Season 2. By Season 3, he stars in his own local access TV talk show, Wake Up White People.
- Direne (Jennifer Regan) – Jacket's wife, who runs the front convenience store section of the town's combined bar/convenience store.

== Episodes ==
=== Series overview ===
Season	Episodes	Originally released	
Season	Episodes	First released	Last released
1	6	November 6, 2011	November 11, 2011
2	14	September 10, 2013	September 27, 2013
3	8	December 2, 2014	December 11, 2014

=== Season 1 (2011) ===
No. overall	No. in season	Title	Directed by	Written by	Original release date	US viewers (millions)
1	1	"And So It Begends"	Vernon Chatman & John Lee	Vernon Chatman & John Lee	November 6, 2011	1.18
2	2	"No, Jojo, No!"	Vernon Chatman & John Lee	Vernon Chatman & John Lee	November 7, 2011	1.32
3	3	"Holy Meemaw"	Vernon Chatman & John Lee	Vernon Chatman & John Lee	November 8, 2011	1.25
4	4	"Fear is Dog Spelled Bassackwards"	Vernon Chatman & John Lee	Vernon Chatman & John Lee	November 9, 2011	N/A
5	5	"Death Begins at Conception"	Vernon Chatman & John Lee	Vernon Chatman & John Lee	November 10, 2011	N/A
6	6	"Dare to Holler"	Vernon Chatman & John Lee	Vernon Chatman & John Lee	November 11, 2011	N/A

=== Season 2 (2013) ===
No. overall	No. in season	Title	Directed by	Written by	Original release date	US viewers (millions)
7	1	"Begend the Endginning"	Vernon Chatman & John Lee	Vernon Chatman & John Lee	September 10, 2013	1.04
Hurlan passes back into the cave from whence he came – only to wander into an alternate reality where the events of the Season 1 finale never occurred.
8	2	"Proper Dental Care Is Murder"	Vernon Chatman & John Lee	Vernon Chatman & John Lee	September 11, 2013	1.17
9	3	"The Blue Lonegoon"	Vernon Chatman & John Lee	Vernon Chatman & John Lee	September 12, 2013	1.13
The Preacher delivers fire and brimstone sermons that consumption of meat is evil, because it leads to homosexual behavior. The new ban is hypocritical, as the Preacher himself continues to eat meat in private. Hurlan is attracted by the smell but the Preacher deflects attention from himself by insisting that Hurlan's soul is in danger if he continues to want meat. The Preacher takes him on a weekend prayer retreat in the woods to Camp Praythegayaway, but he soon becomes lost. Awakening, Hurlan is convinced that his desire to eat meat actually did result in some sort of homosexual-orgy-apocalypse, which destroyed human civilization. Hurlan therefore settles into the camp and attempts to rebuild civilization from scratch. Meanwhile, with Hurlan missing, Boss Hoss's video will instructs that Hambrosia will lead the town in his absence. Finally in charge, she decides to "cut loose" by listening to vinyl records and taking a bite of tobacco chaw – which nearly kills her. Hambrosia subsequently bans all forms of tobacco from town, and goes door to door with a shotgun in hand to make sure the ban is in effect. However, Hurshe one-ups her sister by making her own smoke-easy in the local bar. Hurshe makes up her own phoney religion of "Chawstafarianism" and claims the legal loophole that chaw is her religion's "sacred herb" and thus cannot be regulated. The two sisters find themselves at loggerheads.
10	4	"The Telltale Butthole"	Vernon Chatman & John Lee	Vernon Chatman & John Lee	September 13, 2013	1.21
Hurshe's estranged husband, formerly one of the most feared and terrible men in the Holler, is released from prison and returns to town. This further complicates the affair between Hurshe and the Sheriff. The Preacher is upset as well, because before he joined the Church he used to be a drug mule for Hurshe's husband. Meanwhile, Hambrosia is once again upset that she was "born without lady parts", until she is told that the Doctor can surgically give her some. Hurshe's husband decides to get revenge by having sex with Hambrosia – by making the Preacher have sex with her. Note: Hurlan does not appear in this episode.
11	5	"Mu-Mu-Mu-Meat"	Vernon Chatman & John Lee	Vernon Chatman & John Lee	September 16, 2013	N/A
12	6	"Pequiem for a Recker"	Vernon Chatman & John Lee	Vernon Chatman & John Lee	September 17, 2013	1.25
13	7	"Emotional Can of Mommyworms"	Vernon Chatman & John Lee	Vernon Chatman & John Lee	September 18, 2013	1.26
14	8	"The DeArranged Marriage"	Vernon Chatman & John Lee	Vernon Chatman & John Lee	September 19, 2013	N/A
15	9	"Werelan"	Vernon Chatman & John Lee	Vernon Chatman & John Lee	September 20, 2013	1.33
16	10	"Come Unity"	Vernon Chatman & John Lee	Vernon Chatman & John Lee	September 23, 2013	1.19
A mysterious man appears in town.
17	11	"Hambrain Jan"	Vernon Chatman & John Lee	Vernon Chatman & John Lee	September 24, 2013	1.23
Hambrosia's brain escapes to find Hurlan, who mistakes it for a Mexican. The brain cleans his room but ultimately causes a wind storm with destruction to the city. Without the torment of her psychic brain, Hambrosia becomes a laid back, free-spirited hippie, constantly trying to share non-sensical poetry with everyone. He sends the brain away, who returns to Hambrosia.
18	12	"Preverse Psychologism"	Vernon Chatman & John Lee	Vernon Chatman & John Lee	September 25, 2013	1.12
19	13	"Gamebored"	Vernon Chatman & John Lee	Vernon Chatman & John Lee	September 26, 2013	1.05
Feeling lonely, Hurlan takes to using an old typewriter, and actually writes a book-length manuscript. He soon becomes a Truman Capote-esque novelist, respected by the town as their first and only literary great. Meanwhile, it is revealed that by manipulating cloth dolls of them on a chessboard, Meemaw psychically influences the townsfolk for her own twisted games. Many of the bizarre occurrences, rivalries, and love triangles in the town were really created by Meemaw for her own petty amusement, such as Hurshe having an affair with the husband of her own sister. When Hambrosia learns of this she becomes outraged that Meemaw is forcing the town's inhabitants to commit negative, sinful acts which they aren't actually responsible for. She attempts to round up everyone into the church to pray away Meemaw's influence, but to no avail, as Meemaw psychically hijacks the meeting. However, Boss Hoss' video will reveals to Hurlan that there is one cloth doll Meemaw doesn't know about, which he hid under his hat: a doll of Meemaw herself. Hurlan uses the doll to control Meemaw and force her to relinquish her gameboard to him, to set the townsfolk free.
20	14	"The Endginning"	Vernon Chatman & John Lee	Vernon Chatman & John Lee	September 27, 2013	1.18

=== Season 3 (2014) ===
No. overall	No. in season	Title	Directed by	Written by	Original release date	US viewers (millions)
21	1	"In Meatro"	Vernon Chatman & John Lee	Vernon Chatman & John Lee	December 2, 2014	1.069
Hurshe lends her womb to gestate a cocoon for Hambrosia to raise as a vessel for Meemaw to transfer into in order to prevent the apocalyptic Comening.
22	2	"WUWPs"	Vernon Chatman & John Lee	Vernon Chatman & John Lee	December 3, 2014	1.138
The townspeople chop Hurlan's head off, but he is still too dumb to die. They resort to his education to force him to capitulate.
23	3	"Klansgender Rights"	Vernon Chatman & John Lee	Vernon Chatman & John Lee	December 4, 2014	1.263
The town's children, including an age-reduced Hurshe, put on a white supremacist pageant of United States history.
24	4	"Groaning Amore"	Vernon Chatman & John Lee	Vernon Chatman & John Lee	December 5, 2014	0.961
Hambrosia is haunted by a couple of ghosts. Sheriff seeks Doc's help to improve his impaired performance in his affair with Hurshe.
25	5	"Oralboros"	Vernon Chatman & John Lee	Vernon Chatman & John Lee	December 6, 2014	1.159
While struggling to keep Meemaw alive, Doc befriends – and exploits – the Chinese worker cranking the wheel of her CPAP machine.
26	6	"Slaughter Me to Heaven"	Vernon Chatman & John Lee	Vernon Chatman & John Lee	December 9, 2014	1.035
Despondent that Sheriff prefers her sister, Hambrosia curses Hurshe with a personal hygiene issue.
27	7	"Congroined Hearts"	Vernon Chatman & John Lee	Vernon Chatman & John Lee	December 10, 2014	1.051
Sheriff despairs that Hambrosia will not let him pursue a relationship with her sister. Overhearing Sheriff say that this is "the end of the world", Cutter starts a family off the grid. Hambrosia curses Sheriff to the fate he wanted with Hurshe, before disintegrating all the main characters – except Sheriff – who manages to kill Hambrosia by a gunshot.
28	8	"The Comening"	Vernon Chatman & John Lee	Vernon Chatman & John Lee	December 11, 2014	1.258
Meemaw implodes. In a church with other townsfolk, who are all accompanied by doppelgänger versions of themselves, Sheriff watches a filmed speech of President Jimmy Carter discussing energy – also in duplicate.
