= Xavier: Renegade Angel =

American adult animated TV series

- Genre: Absurdist humor Surreal humor Black comedy Satire; Anti-humor
- Created by: Vernon Chatman; John Lee; Alyson Levy; Jim Tozzi
- Written by: Vernon Chatman; John Lee; Alyson Levy
- Directed by: Vernon Chatman; John Lee; Marco Bertoldo
- Voices of: Vernon Chatman; John Lee; Alyson Levy; Jim Tozzi; John Flansburgh
- Country of origin: United States
- Original language: English
- No. of seasons: 2
- No. of episodes: 20

Production
- Executive producers: Vernon Chatman; John Lee
- Producer: Lisa M. Thomas
- Editors: Rob Moore; Jon Philpot
- Running time: 11–12 minutes
- Production companies: PFFR Productions; Cinematico; Williams Street

Original release
- Network: Adult Swim
- Release: November 4, 2007 – April 16, 2009

Xavier: Renegade Angel is an American adult animated absurdist black comedy television series created by Vernon Chatman and John Lee for Cartoon Network's nighttime programming block Adult Swim. It was produced by PFFR Productions, producers of Wonder Showzen, with computer animation provided by Cinematico. It premiered on November 1, 2007, on the Adult Swim website and November 4, 2007, on Adult Swim.

Xavier features an elaborate and nonlinear plot following the musings of an itinerant humanoid pseudo-shaman named Xavier. The show is known for its use of ideologically critical dark comedy as well as surrealist and absurdist humor presented through a psychedelic and satirically New Age lens. The program is also normally rated TV MA for intense, graphic, often bloody violence, as well as strong sexual content, use of racially/ethnically offensive language, and grotesque depictions in a comedic manner.

== Characters ==
- Xavier (voiced by Vernon Chatman) is a well-meaning yet naïve and oblivious faun-like shaman wanderer with delusions of grandeur. Xavier often brings destruction to his environment and those around him in his attempts to right what he sees as wrong or help others with their problems. Xavier's left hand is a snake from the elbow downwards; it usually acts like an ordinary hand, but in the episodes "The 6th Teat of Good Intentions" and "El Tornadador", it appears to possess its own consciousness and speaks to Xavier directly. Xavier also has brown fur, a bird-like beak in place of a nose, backwards bending knees, and ocular heterochromia, having one brown eye and one blue. Xavier's purpose seems to change slightly with each episode, with the initial plot setting him as a wandering philosopher, aspiring "wise man" or sage of sorts whose intent on hermitism seems to give references to Native American vision quests. Of initial importance seems to be Xavier's search for an answer to the abstract question, "What doth life?". Much of the first season focuses on his search for the person who killed his father, while the second season puts focus on his search for his mother, whom he believes to be alive after digging up her grave.
- Chief Master Guru (voiced by Jim Tozzi) – This supposedly Indigenous shaman took Xavier in after he was orphaned, and taught him mystical and spiritual practices (one such teaching being the power to heal others with the use of a fictional instrument called a "shakashuri"). The Shaman features frequently in flashbacks, and—despite Xavier's adulation—is shown to be abusive, sadistic, bullying and cruel.
- Xavier's father (voiced by Jim Tozzi) – Being dead, Xavier's father only appears in flashbacks and visions. Xavier says he wants to avenge his father's death, but in one such flashback his father insists that Xavier himself killed him. In a flashback, however, (one which Xavier later denies as being true), Xavier's father takes Xavier to a remote location and abandons him as a child, only leaving him with a bicycle as a means of compensation, before crashing into a truck and exploding.
- Xavier's mother (voiced by Alyson Levy) is generally seen in flashbacks as constantly either drunk, drug-addled, or having sex with men or animals. Xavier's mother seems to have hated him for his appearances, calling him a "demon child", among other names. In "Braingeas Final Cranny", it is revealed that Xavier's mother tried to abort Xavier, though she found out that she was too far along into the pregnancy to do so. She instead allowed the doctor to torture Xavier with a cattle prod.
- Computer (portrayed by John Flansburgh) is a sentient computer used by Xavier for analysis and information. He appears as a jerkily edited live-action actor set in front of a black and white background.

== Creation and contents ==
The series features ribald wordplay, nonchalant violence and transgressive sexuality, in deeply nested, often recursive plots. These plots are often nonlinear in their chronology; however, each episode seems to contain similar themes and motifs, as well as a single opening scene that has recurred in every episode of Xavier: a depiction of the titular character wandering through a desert (likely a satirical take on the "wandering in the desert" archetype as a search for wisdom) as he narrates a semi-spontaneous, often nonsensical philosophical thought that many times connects with the episode at hand, whilst the title card of the show itself flies overhead, usually varying in action or position. An opening theme presumed to be played by Xavier on his "shakashuri" is present during these.

Co-creator Vernon Chatman humorously called the show "a warning to children and adults about the dangers of spirituality". The show has been known to show insensitivity and caricatures of Catholicism, Islam, Middle America, redneck stereotypes, and anarcho-punk subcultures.

Xavier often incorporates underlying themes and concepts based outside of, though interconnected with, the plot of each episode. Philosophical or political concepts are often juxtaposed with the surrealistic and aleatory nature of the show. Society and cultural psychology and phenomena, the meaning of life, the existence of sentience and the nature of reality have been examined in one form or another throughout the program's 2 seasons.

Jokes and humor tend to be oriented towards Xavier's own philosophical inquiry and the "deep," "zen-like" diction of wisdom quotes from various spiritual systems (particularly Native American and Hindu or Eastern spirituality) that Xavier seemingly attempts to mimic. These are many times lightly mocked with Xavier's misuse of the phrases, reflecting on contemporary humor and taking the often circular logic of such statements far out of context.

Taboo topics — such as necrophilia, bestiality, homophobia, abortion, irreligion, pedophilia, incest, self-injury, and racism — are used as sources for humor. In this respect, the program can be seen as containing a substantial amount of black comedy.

== Episodes ==
Season	Episodes	Originally released	
Season	Episodes	First released	Last released
1	10	November 4, 2007	January 13, 2008
2	10	February 12, 2009	April 16, 2009

=== Season 1 (2007–2008) ===
No. overall	No. in season	Title	Directed by	Original release date	Prod. code
1	1	"What Life D-D-Doth"	Vernon Chatman & John Lee	November 4, 2007	101
Xavier, an overconfident and freakish self-proclaimed guardian angel, wanders into a hostile town and gets his "shakashuri" instrument broken by the dim-witted locals. He asks the town's computer a philosophical question that overloads its system, and the town throws the busted computers in their lake on Xavier's advice. The computers release a virus into the water that pixelates the town and traps them in a glitch, which Xavier frees them from by cobbling together a shakashuri out of body parts and soothing the computer with a song. He tests the restored computer by giving it another question, which again overloads it and compacts the entire town into a ball of light, which Xavier then eats.
2	2	"Chief Beef Loco"	Vernon Chatman & John Lee	November 11, 2007	102
Xavier encounters a dying mosquito that lays eggs in his brain after he tries to save it. He comes across Percy, a dejected boy who had his school mascot costume stolen by a local gang, and Xavier decides to pretend he is the mascot to increase Percy's popularity, earning the gang's respect. He realizes their symbol is the same one carved on the body of his master (who actually faked his death to get away from Xavier) and decides to infiltrate them. He is selected to stand in for the gang leader for a week, during which he reforms the gang, but ends up having them flush drugs that belong to a platinum-skinned dealer named Shiny. Shiny defeats the gang and beats up Xavier, causing the eggs in his brain to hatch and form a man made of mosquitos, which kills Shiny by melting him. The mosquito-man rejects Xavier's advances and decides to date Percy, while the gang uses Shiny's remains to build a rehabilitation center, until the building comes alive and kills them.
3	3	"Weapons Grade Life"	Vernon Chatman, John Lee & Marco Bertoldo	November 18, 2007	103
Xavier meets Robbie, a paraplegic genius child that he unintentionally inspires to artificially create life. Jealous of his success, Xavier informs Robbie's Christian Scientist surgeon father that his son has been performing all his "prayer-based" operations for him using science, causing him to lose his faith in God and commit suicide by blowing up Robbie's lab while standing in his created life. The two fuse to make the explosion alive, and it goes on a rampage when people begin to mock it. Robbie calms the explosion by telling it he converted to Christianity, and stabs it to death so the army cannot get ahold of it. The explosion's soul ascends to Heaven, which it blows up.
4	4	"The 6th Teat of Good Intentions"	Vernon Chatman, John Lee & Marco Bertoldo	November 25, 2007	104
Xavier comes across a woman with eight babies and showing preference to one, and, fueled by his own neglectful childhood, takes the remaining seven, believing them to be abandoned. As he develops a one-sided attraction to the frantic mother, his left arm, which is a sentient snake past the elbow, begins to eat the babies. As the police close in on him, Xavier, not understanding that he is the one who kidnapped the babies, allows Snake Hand to eat the rest of the babies to hide the "evidence." Snake Hand consumes Xavier himself, causing him to turn into a giant telepathic fetus, which the police still execute via electric chair. The current causes it to turn into an egg that births Xavier, who promises the mother he will come back for her before leaving.
5	5	"Pet Siouxicide"	Vernon Chatman, John Lee & Marco Bertoldo	December 2, 2007	105
After causing a pet store owner to get robbed by his own imagination, Xavier allows a spoiled rich boy to buy him to pay the man back. When the boy refuses to listen to any of Xavier's life advice, he forces the boy to have a flashback while he mocks Xavier, during which Xavier's master teaches him the truth of suffering. Enlightened, the boy has Xavier help him inject his wealthy father with Native American blood in hopes of enlightening him as well, but he instead opens a casino and starts drilling for more blood. The drilled blood turn into hostile Native Americans, and the boy and Xavier drill on a cowboy burial ground to fight them, which is tainted with Middle Eastern blood. The Middle Eastern cowboys and Native Americans fight as the boy watches in horror, and Xavier abandons him.
6	6	"World of Hurt, BC"	Vernon Chatman & John Lee	December 9, 2007	106
Xavier sees a news report that the oldest cave drawing known to man resembles him. Remembering hearing that smoking cigarettes and eating bacon takes time off a person's life, he concludes that if he eats bacon and smokes fast enough, he can time travel. He uses this method to travel back to the day the painting was created, and notices a bruise that resembles himself on a cavewoman's back. He enters the bruise, where he learns that his mother had sex with multiple animals the night he was conceived. Xavier emerges from the cavewoman's back and gives her abusive husband a breakthrough, who offers to help him find the painting. Unsure of how to describe it, Xavier draws it on the wall and realizes he was the one who drew it. He returns to the present by vomiting up the bacon, although he is forced to eat some of the vomit when he goes too far forward. (Guests: Junior Brown, John Flansburgh)
7	7	"Bloodcorn"	Vernon Chatman & John Lee	December 16, 2007	107
After seeing a commercial advertising a factory that sells combinations of cookies and tampons, Xavier goes to the polluting factory and shuts it down by plugging up the exhaust pipe. One of the workers hires him to help on his farm, but becomes angry when Xavier is unable to perform a rain dance, shooting at the sky and hitting God. God's blood rains down across the Earth, mutating plant life into homicidal monsters. Xavier and the farmer stop the blood rain by plugging the exhaust pipe with cookie-tampons and shooting it into the sky, plugging up God, who is revealed to be female.
8	8	"Escape from Squatopian Freedom"	Vernon Chatman & John Lee	December 23, 2007	108
Xavier meets Puggler (Timothy Levitch), a "punk rock juggler," who shows him his home of "Squatopia", an anarchist commune. He steals a crystal given to Xavier by his father (unknowingly made from a urinal cake) and Xavier enlists 'Tude, a squatter who wants to leave the commune, to help him. 'Tude tells him Puggler will likely be at the "Burning Person" festival, so Xavier sells his semen so they can get money, having gone his entire life without masturbating. His orgasm creates a dog-like sperm creature that tunnels to Burning Person for them, where Puggler finds 'Tude and reveals that he is his father, giving him the crystal. 'Tude rejects him and throws the crystal away, but the sperm creature saves it, and Xavier accepts him as a son and gives him the crystal. The festivalgoers burn the effigy and the sperm creature impregnates it, causing it to explode and light everyone on fire. As the police try to make sense of the scene, Xavier takes the crystal from the sperm creature's corpse and leaves.
9	9	"Signs from Godrilla"	Vernon Chatman, John Lee & Marco Bertoldo	January 6, 2008	109
While walking, Xavier comes across a crossroads that split between "MIND" and "HEART". Xavier chooses the "MIND" direction, coming across a town where everyone is dead, and he finds a preacher (Will Oldham) having committed suicide next to a gorilla. He consumes the preacher's brain matter to find out what happened, learning that the gorilla is a sign language interpreter for the local church that the preacher developed an attraction to. The preacher asks his psychic for advice, who tells him that having sex with the gorilla and committing suicide will allow it to take over the church and eventually convert the entire world to Christianity. Xavier realizes that the events of the entire episode were in his head following the crossroads, and instead decides to take the "HEART" path, where he is met by people he has encountered in the previous episodes. They embrace him before eating him alive and throwing his remains in a pile of other dead Xaviers, with a narrator revealing only two Xaviers are left in the world.
10	10	"Shakashuri Blowdown"	Vernon Chatman, John Lee & Marco Bertoldo	January 13, 2008	110
While searching for his father's killer, Xavier's father appears to him in the clouds and tells him that he killed him by accidentally setting the house on fire. Overcome with remorse, Xavier prepares to commit suicide, but is attacked by a couple of rednecks and has his wrist shaved, where he discovers a phone number tattooed into his skin. He calls it and another Xavier picks up, leading the two to get into an argument and challenge each other to a "shakashuri blowdown." They play their shakashuris, creating visions that duel each other, until an announcer calls time and tells the viewer to vote for the winner, stating that the victor gets their own show.

=== Season 2 (2009) ===
No. overall	No. in season	Title	Directed by	Original release date	Prod. code
11	1	"Vibracaust"	Vernon Chatman & John Lee	February 12, 2009	201
Xavier kidnaps Seamus, a boy that he believes is being molested by a Catholic priest (Bill Hader), when the boy is in fact a sadistic rapist, and gives him to a grieving couple that recently lost their son. Unable to take his abuse, they feed him "spiritually based" pills made from the chants of Buddhist monks that calm him. Xavier investigates the pills, believing they are misappropriating spirituality, but finds that the monks make them themselves. He encourages them to relax, leading them to become hedonistic and make a machine that chants for them. He accidentally breaks the machine, which threatens to destroy the world, and feeds it a large amount of pills to stop it. This only fuses everyone near it into a large statue of flesh, which insults Xavier, and he digs up his deceased mother to tattle on it. He discovers that his mother's body is not in her coffin, and resolves to find her.
12	2	"Xavier's Maneuver"	Vernon Chatman & John Lee	February 19, 2009	202
Xavier saves Don Ho, a "Chitalianese" crime boss, from choking to death on a chicken bone by hanging upside down on his body and blowing air up his rectum. Ho's near-death experience convinces him to begin extorting Heaven, and he has Xavier save him again after he chokes himself and steals light from the afterlife. He reveals that he has raised the ultimate hitman — a mute man wearing a zentai who has only eaten regenerative animals all his life and cannot be killed. Xavier realizes Ho is a criminal and forces him to look at Heaven's light, making him have an epiphany. He leaves, and Xavier tries to convince the depressed hitman to live, but he continually tries to commit suicide and keeps splitting himself into smaller and smaller versions of himself. A "hit-sludge" of countless microscopic hitmen eventually kill Ho and everyone around him.
13	3	"El Tornadador"	Vernon Chatman & John Lee	February 26, 2009	204
Xavier meets Eric (Vincent D'Onofrio), a scientist who works with wind, proving to him that nature can be harnessed in an attempt to be his friend, but the scientist leaves to go study wind further. Xavier discovers that Snake Hand can turn him inside out when aroused, and while inside out, he meets a masochistic punk man named Dark Notion who is enraptured by his disgusting appearance. While normal, he learns that the scientist has harnessed and enslaved wind into small tornadoes that do labor for him, and schemes with Dark Notion while inside out to release them. Xavier turns back to normal as the scientist arrives with the police to arrest them for releasing the wind, taking off a small part of himself to pretend he caught both Dark Notion and his "accomplice." As the scientist promises to be his best friend, the wind forms into a massive tornado that sucks up the scientist and turns the entire world inside out.
14	4	"Haunted Tonk"	Vernon Chatman & John Lee	March 5, 2009	205
Xavier visits his childhood home, now torn down and converted into a strip club for pregnant women. He is hired by club owner Big Papa Dick (Judah Friedlander) to be the bouncer, where he learns that the strippers believe the place is haunted by the non-existent child of a stripper who had a phantom pregnancy. Xavier remembers that his mother would have nightmares (which, unbeknownst to him, were about him) and wishes he could have comforted her, but realizes if he remembers that his older self told his younger self to do so, it would happen. He remembers being trained by his older self as a child and being instructed to give his addict mother fake pills and apple juice instead of her drugs and alcohol, and when he revealed this to her as a teenager, she went insane and dissociated from reality. In the present, Xavier talking to his younger self is mistaken for him talking to the phantom baby, and he is ordered to chase it out. He makes himself look like a ghost by tearing the fabric of time and wearing it, revealing that his father died in the house fire trying to save his mother, who believed the fire was not real. Xavier's childhood drawings come through the rip in time and destroy the strip club, and the entire episode is revealed to be the recollection of an older Xavier.
15	5	"Free Range Manibalism"	Vernon Chatman & John Lee	March 12, 2009	203
Needing to use a bathroom, Xavier tries to use one in an upscale meat restaurant that pampers animals until they die, but is turned away by the hostess (Heather Lawless). He discovers two homeless men who yearn for a better life, and disguises them as pigs with the skin of several footballs, allowing him to use the bathroom when he gives them to the restaurant. One of the men dies, leaving the other one distraught, and Xavier attempts to give his life meaning by showing him his spiritual aura. His aura separates from his body because of the years of abuse he has done to it, and begins prostituting itself for a pimp named Per Se (Snoop Dogg). Xavier realizes the impure aura has given its customers a "spiritually transmitted disease," which forms into a giant membrane that begins unleashing the man's darkest memories on the city. Xavier stops it by putting the man inside the aura, revealing him to be Santa Claus, and he thanks Xavier before Xavier bursts out of his body and kills him, having a "soulgasm" and flying away.
16	6	"Damnesia Vu"	Vernon Chatman & John Lee	March 19, 2009	206
Xavier awakens in a circular room of doors with no memory of who he is. He tries to go through each of them, but every door leads to a bizarre situation that usually ends with him dead and always puts him back in the room. Xavier gets the idea to open all the doors at once, which creates a cube that displays a moment from each of the doors, which come together to say "we are all just players in the game of life." A voice tells Xavier that he can "now begin to play the game" as he bows for a cheering crowd, before falling through the floor in the same position he started the episode in.
17	7	"Going Normal"	Vernon Chatman & John Lee	March 26, 2009	207
Xavier discovers a cryogenics lab where people with incurable, terminal diseases have been frozen until a cure can be discovered. He unfreezes them, getting them killed as they call him a freak and one of them swears revenge. Deciding he wants to give up being a guardian angel and become "normal," he cuts off the face of one of the dead men and wears it, taking the name "Ryan" and getting a job. He learns that a deceased employee was also named Ryan and takes his family, and becomes a big hit at the company by suggesting that they do "normal" things. Someone fakes evidence of his infidelity and gives it to his wife (Kristen Schaal), getting him kicked out of the house, and submits an idea to Xavier's company to make him dress up in a "freak" costume that resembles himself. As children beat him up as he is dressed in the costume, Xavier discovers that the man who swore revenge on him is behind the events. One of Xavier's suggested projects, a hot dog chain to the moon, makes the moon stop rotating and causes ice to shoot down the chain, freezing the entire world. Xavier sneezes, causing the viewer's television screen to fracture.
18	8	"Kharmarabionic Lotion"	Vernon Chatman & John Lee	April 2, 2009	208
Xavier comes across a town grieving the death of one of their residents, the man who invented anti-aging lotion. He encourages them (while pretending to channel the dead man's spirit) to honor him by playing the lottery together and using their winnings to erect a statue of him. Instead, the town wins and get all their bodies plated with gold, and they learn that their houses are going to be repossessed unless they pay the bank. Xavier comes up with the idea to have them pretend to be robots and allow Muslims to visit them under the guise of going to a theme park, while at the same time, he begins to believe a town resident is his mother after she answers an ad he put out, although she denies this. When she becomes angry with him, Xavier converts the townspeople to Islam to prevent the Muslims from destroying them for speaking out of turn. The townspeople fight back, destroying the towers of anti-aging cream, which washes over the Muslims and turns them into dinosaurs. Their destroyed bodies leak oil, which the townspeople get so rich off of that they buy Adult Swim and sell it to the Muslims for profit, causing the rest of the episode to be broadcast in Arabic. The oil turns the woman into a dinosaur-gold human hybrid, who Xavier still believes to be his mother.
19	9	"Damnesia You"	Vernon Chatman & John Lee	April 9, 2009	209
The episode is made up of fan-made content that show their own concepts for original scenes from the show, although it is presented as "a tape we found in the garbage." It opens with the same opener as "Damnesia Vu", and it ends with a segment where Xavier eats himself, taking his severed head back to the hall that "Damnesia Vu" ended in as he licks up his own blood.
20	10	"Braingea's Final Cranny"	Vernon Chatman & John Lee	April 16, 2009	210
After accidentally getting a boy institutionalized, Xavier learns that a woman who "thinks she gave birth to a freak" is in the mental hospital and concludes it is his mother. He pretends to be insane and is examined by the hospital's psychiatrist (Brian Stack), spawning a sentient Rorschach blot in the process. Xavier investigates within the hospital and comes across an old woman who has been lobotomized, picking through discarded brain matter until he finds his mother's, and he puts it in the woman's head. His mother reveals that she faked her death to get away from him and commits suicide, and the head nurse of the hospital sleeps with him. The hospital's psychologist reveals that the head nurse is actually Xavier's lobotomized mother, and that he was running an experiment involving lobotomies and incest. Xavier's blot runs away with Xavier's mother after killing the psychologist, and Xavier follows it and convinces it to turn into a large ice cream cone. He eats it for nine months as his mother prepares to give birth to their child, and the baby mixes with the Rorschach blot to create a symbol, revealed to be another blot that Xavier is observing in a therapy session with the hospital's psychiatrist. The psychiatrist tells him that he is ready to see who he really is for the first time, showing him a mirror, revealing that Xavier is a normal-looking man. As Xavier proclaims himself cured, the doctor asks "cured? Who said there was anything wrong with you?" revealing himself to be a Xavier-like creature.

== International broadcast ==
In Canada, Xavier: Renegade Angel previously aired on Teletoon's Teletoon at Night block and later G4's Adult Digital Distraction block. The series currently airs in Canada on the Canadian version of Adult Swim.

== Home media ==
Adult Swim released the series on DVD in America on November 10, 2009, shortly after the series finale originally aired. Madman Entertainment released the series on DVD on Region 4 in Australia on February 10, 2010. In addition to being available on DVD, the entire series is also available on iTunes.

DVD name	Release date	Ep #	Features
Seasons 1 and 2	November 10, 2009	20	"Xaviercise!", fan commentary and contest submissions

A high-definition release of the show was available on the Max streaming service, until December 31, 2023.

== Reception ==
In 2009, DVD Talk's Casey Burchby gave the show three and half stars out of five, noting "Xavier: Renegade Angel is intelligent, entertaining, and very funny. It is also consistent to a fault. The show never develops much beyond its original concept and falls into a repetitious rut. [...] Much like Flight of the Conchords, its small triumphs are better appreciated over time; a concentrated dose of the show reveals its flaws."

Xavier: Renegade Angel was largely ignored on initial release. Nonetheless, it garnered a cult following; by 2017, it was highly regarded for its originality, absurd imagery and smart, intricate humor. In that year, Inverse.com placed Xavier 15th on a list of "The 25 Most Iconic Adult Swim Characters of All Time". Also in 2017, Max Carpenter of Vulture said that it "stands out as a puzzlement of form with its Second Life graphical environs and sphinxlike protagonist [...] Even in the context of PFFR’s twisted endeavors, the show's blend of form and content is a brilliant anomaly. [...] Xavier is on one level a comedy-by-assault, an explosion of wordplay, and a ridiculousness of images that the average viewer can only take in piecemeal." Lionel Boyce, co-creator of The Jellies!, listed it among his favorite cartoons.

== 2020 short ==
In 2020, Xavier returned to give a virtual commencement speech, as part of Adult Swim's Commencement Speaker Series 2020, a response to the cancellation of commencement ceremonies due to the COVID-19 pandemic. Vernon Chatman returned to voice Xavier as part of a six-minute video that was released on YouTube and the Adult Swim app.
