= Vernon Chatman =

American voice actor, stand-up comedian and musician (born 1972)

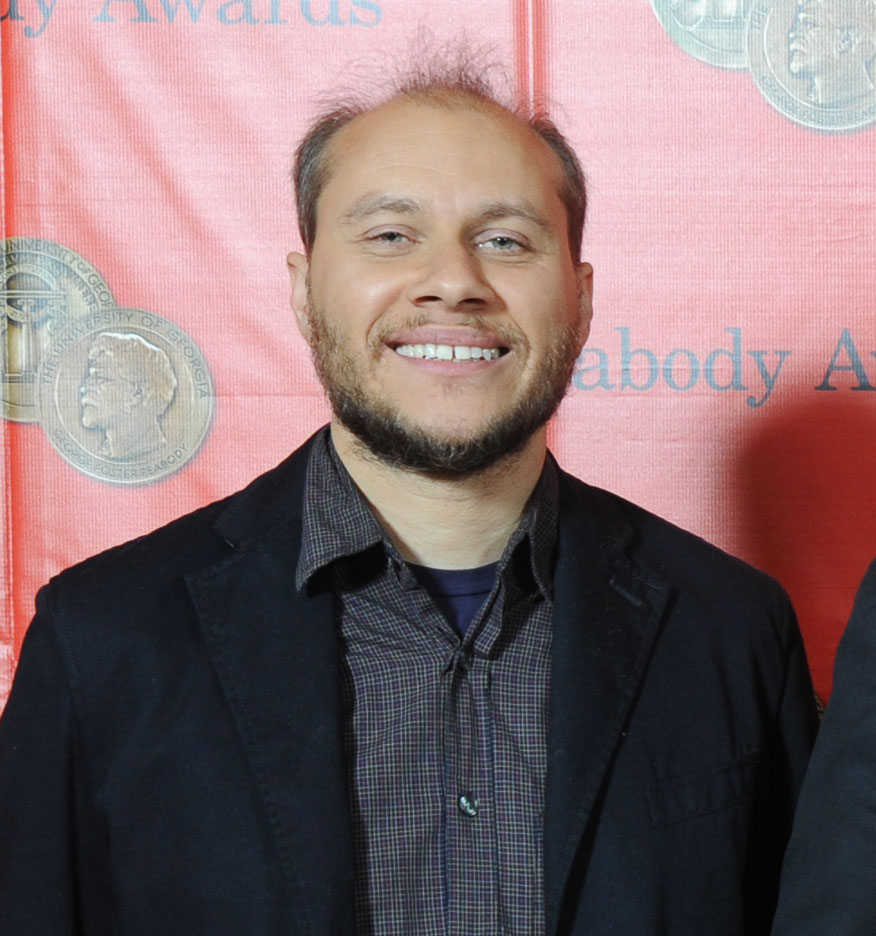
- Chatman at the Peabody Awards in May 2013
- Born: October 31, 1972 (age 54); Brooklyn, New York, U.S.
- Education: San Francisco State University

Comedy career
- Years active: 1996–present
- Medium: Stand-up; film; television; books
- Genres: Surreal humor Black comedy Horror comedy Satire

Vernon Chatman (born October 31, 1972) is an American screenwriter, producer, director, voice actor, stand-up comedian, musician, and a member of PFFR, an art collective based in Brooklyn, New York City. He created the television series Wonder Showzen, Xavier: Renegade Angel, The Heart, She Holler and The Shivering Truth. He also produces, voices characters, and writes for South Park.

== Early life ==
Chatman was born in Manhattan, New York, but grew up in San Jose, California. He was born to a European-American mother and an African-American father. Chatman attended San Francisco State University, from which he graduated in 1994.

== Career ==
In 1996, Chatman began his career as a stand-up comedian and eventually a comedy writer, producer, musician, and television creator. Chatman previously wrote for television shows such as The Chris Rock Show (for which he won an Emmy), Late Night with Conan O'Brien, That's My Bush! and The Downer Channel. Before Wonder Showzen, he and long-time friend and PFFR collaborator John Lee created the Snoop Dogg comedy series Doggy Fizzle Televizzle for MTV.

Along with Lee, he is the co-creator of the MTV2 series Wonder Showzen as well as the Adult Swim shows Xavier: Renegade Angel and The Heart, She Holler. The two met as undergraduates at San Francisco State University. One of his most high-profile voice acting roles is as Towelie, the marijuana-smoking talking towel on South Park, where he also serves as a staff writer. In 2012, he became a producer on the third season of the FX series Louie. In 2017, Adult Swim ordered The Shivering Truth, a "darkly surreal anthology comedy" from Chatman. On March 22, 2023, it was announced that he will write Whitney Springs, a musical comedy film, with involvement from Kendrick Lamar, Dave Free, Trey Parker and Matt Stone.

=== Voices on South Park ===
- Towelie (2001–2010, 2018–present)
- Tiger Woods
- C.D.C. Man #5
- Dominic Cobb
- Matt Hasselbeck

== Discography ==
- Rock Rocker Rocketh (2001, self-released)
- Injustice Center (2003, Invasion Planète Recordings)
- United We Doth (2003, Birdman)
- Chrome Ghost (2005, Birdman)
- Dark Louds Over Red Meat (2018, Housewife Records)

== Filmography ==
=== Television ===
Year	Title	Director	Writer	Producer	Executive producer	Actor	Role	Notes
1997	Comics Come Home 3						Himself	Stand-up
1997–1998	The Keenen Ivory Wayans Show		Yes					11 episodes
1998	Premium Blend						Himself	Stand-up
1998–1999	The Chris Rock Show		Yes					12 episodes
1999	Armagedd'N Sync		Yes					TV special
1999	1999 Teen Choice Awards			Yes				Segment producer
1999	1999 MTV Video Music Awards							Consultant
1999–2000	Late Night with Conan O'Brien		Yes					144 episodes
2001	Late Friday					Yes	Lars Wishner	1 episode
2001	That's My Bush!		Yes					Staff writer
2001	The Downer Channel		Yes					2 episodes
2001–present	South Park		Yes	Yes		Yes	Towelie (season 5–25) / Vernon – Butt-Out Member / Tiger Woods / C.D.C Man #5 / Dominic Cobb / Ron (voices)	Consultant writer (2001–2007), producer (2007–present)
2002–2003	Doggy Fizzle Televizzle		Yes		Yes			Also creator
2003	2003 MTV Video Music Awards							Consultant
2005–2006	Wonder Showzen	Yes	Yes		Yes	Yes	Chauncey / Clarence / Various (voices)	Also creator
2007–2009	Xavier: Renegade Angel	Yes	Yes		Yes	Yes	Xavier / Various (voices)	Also creator
2009	How's Your News?			Yes				
2009–2013	Delocated			Yes				
2011	Totally for Teens				Yes			
2011	Neon Knome				Yes			Later reworked into The Problem Solverz, which he wasn't involved in.
2011	China, IL			Yes				Consulting producer; 5 episodes
2011–2014	The Heart, She Holler	Yes	Yes		Yes			Also creator
2012–2015	Louie			Yes		Yes	Jack Dahl's Receptionist #3	Episode: "Late Show: Part 2"
2015	Neon Joe, Werewolf Hunter				Yes			
2016	Horace and Pete		Yes		Yes			Story co-writer of episode 10
2016	Gigglefudge, U.S.A.		Yes		Yes			Television special
2018–2020	The Shivering Truth	Yes	Yes		Yes	Yes	Narrator	Also creator
2018	Trigger Warning with Killer Mike		Yes					
2019	Di Bibl				Yes			
2021–2023	Teenage Euthanasia				Yes	Yes	Succatash / Charlie Pants (voices)	
2022	Dogvvalker	Yes	Yes		Yes	Yes	Various (voices)	Also creator
2025	Off the Air	Yes						Guest curator

=== Film ===
Year	Title	Director	Writer	Producer	Executive producer	Actor	Role	Notes
2002	Jackass: The Movie		Yes					Concepts
2009	Final Flesh		Yes					
2010	The External World		Yes					Short film
2011	The Original Black Swan		Yes					Short film
2017	I Love You, Daddy		Yes	Yes				
2021	South Park: Post Covid			Yes				
2021	South Park: Post Covid: The Return of Covid			Yes				
2022	South Park: The Streaming Wars			Yes		Yes	Towelie	
2022	South Park: The Streaming Wars Part 2			Yes				
2023	South Park: Joining the Panderverse			Yes				
2023	South Park (Not Suitable for Children)			Yes				
2024	South Park: The End of Obesity			Yes		Yes	Towelie	
2026	Ali G: Who Iz I?		Yes					Story co-writer
TBA	Whitney Springs		Yes	Yes				

=== Video games ===
Year	Title	Director	Writer	Producer	Executive producer	Actor	Role	Notes
2012	South Park: Tenorman's Revenge					Yes	Towelie	
2017	South Park: Phone Destroyer					Yes	Towelie	Archival Recording
2017	South Park: The Fractured but Whole					Yes	Towelie	
2026	Fortnite Battle Royale					Yes	Towelie	

== Books ==
- The External World, co-written with David O'Reilly (2010)
- The Original Black Swan, collaboration with Todd Barry (2011)
- Mindsploitation: Asinine Assignments for the Online Homework Cheating Industry (April 23, 2013, ISBN 978-1934734919)

== Awards and nominations ==
=== Emmy Awards ===
Chatman has been nominated for seven Emmy Awards, winning four.

- 2013 – Primetime Emmy Award for Outstanding Animated Program (for Programming Less Than One Hour) for "Raising the Bar"
- 2009 – Primetime Emmy Award for Outstanding Animated Program (for Programming Less Than One Hour) for "Margaritaville"
- 2008 – Primetime Emmy Award for Outstanding Animated Program (for Programming One Hour or More) for "Imaginationland"
- 1999 – Outstanding Writing for a Variety or Music Program for "The Chris Rock Show"

==== Nominations ====
- 2011 – Outstanding Animated Program for "Crack Baby Athletic Association
- 2010 – Outstanding Animated Program for "200/201"
- 2000 – Outstanding Writing for a Variety, Music or Comedy Program for "The Chris Rock Show"

=== Writers Guild of America Awards ===
Chatman has won two WGA Awards.

- 2013 – Comedy Series – Series for "Louie"
- 2000 – Comedy/Variety (Including Talk) – Series for "Late Night with Conan O'Brien"
