= PFFR =

Art and music collective

- Origin: Brooklyn, New York City
- Genres: Electronic rock, experimental rock, neo-psychedelia
- Years active: 1998–present
- Labels: Birdman, Birdman-A-Phone, Housewife Records
- Members: Vernon Chatman; John Lee; Alyson Levy
- Past members: Jim Tozzi

PFFR (one F silent) is an American production company and art collective based in Brooklyn, New York City and consisting of Vernon Chatman, John Lee, Alyson Levy and formerly Jim Tozzi until 2009. The group has been active since 1998.

== Work ==
The group's portfolio of work includes two albums, one 7-inch EP and one download-only EP (plus a string of live performances as a band), various art exhibits such as An Attack On All Americans or the Tyranny Of Weed shown at the LFL Gallery in New York and the script for the film Final Flesh. In 2010, they held an exhibition/video screening of a selection of their work entitled PFFR Presents Legacy IIX which took place at the Synchronicity Space in Los Angeles, CA between April 3 and May 1.

PFFR are also active in television comedy. They wrote, directed, produced and starred in the MTV2 variety show Wonder Showzen (2005–2006) and the Adult Swim CGI series Xavier: Renegade Angel. For both these shows, Chatman and Lee are the directors and main voice talent, whilst Tozzi and Levy are the animation/character designer and art director, respectively. Levy provides additional voices for both shows whilst Tozzi does only for 'Xavier'. PFFR are also responsible for producing, directing and co-writing Jon Glaser's Adult Swim show Delocated.

In 2015, PFFR produced and directed the music video for Animal Collective's song FloriDada, the first single from their album Painting With.

== PFFR Productions ==
PFFR Productions
- Founded: 2002
- Founder: Vernon Chatman; John Lee; Alyson Levy; Jim Tozzi
- Headquarters: Brooklyn, New York, U.S.
- Products: Wonder Showzen; Xavier: Renegade Angel; The Heart, She Holler; The Shivering Truth

PFFR Productions (otherwise known as PFFFR in the closing logo) is an American film and television arm of PFFR. The company is best known for television and film productions aimed at a mature audience and their work for Cartoon Network's Adult Swim programming block, with such shows like MTV's Wonder Showzen, as well as Xavier: Renegade Angel. They also produced the 2008 Adult Swim pilot Neon Knome, which would later be worked as The Problem Solverz on Cartoon Network in 2011. Other shows include Delocated, The Heart She Holler and The Shivering Truth (all for Adult Swim), as well as the first season of At Home with Amy Sedaris (for truTV).

The on-screen logo features a creature, who is the "mascot" for PFFR's 2005 EP Chrome Ghost.

== Releases ==
=== Studio albums ===
- Rock Rocker Rocketh (CD) (2001, self-released)
- Injustice Center (12-inch) (2002, Invasion Planète Recordings)
- United We Doth (CD) (2003, Birdman)

=== Extended plays ===
- Chrome Ghost (download) (2005, Birdman-A-Phone)
- Dark Louds Over Red Meat (7-inch) (2018, Housewife Records)
- PFFR Legacy XXX: Soundtrack to the Book (2022, Drag City's Soccer Club)

=== Music videos ===
- "Japoney Appoe" (from Rock Rocker Rocketh, Chrome Ghost, and United We Doth)
- "Superfine" (from Rock Rocker Rocketh and United We Doth)
- "Let's Make It Tonite" (from Rock Rocker Rocketh, Chrome Ghost, and PFFR Legacy XXX: Soundtrack to the Book)
- "PFR Booms" (from Rock Rocker Rocketh, and United We Doth)
- "Party Ice" (from Rock Rocker Rocketh, and United We Doth)
- "Sparse Party (from Injustice Center, and United We Doth)
- "Total Dicks (from Injustice Center, and United We Doth)
- "Phit Psonique (from Injustice Center, and United We Doth)
- "Feels Like $" (from Injustice Center and United We Doth)
- "Our Concern" (from Injustice Center and United We Doth)
- "Dark Louds" (from Dark Loud Over Red Meat, and PFFR Legacy XXX: Soundtrack to the Book)
- "Stroytzeker" (from Dark Loud Over Red Meat, and PFFR Legacy XXX: Soundtrack to the Book)
- "PFFIGHHT" (from Dark Loud Over Red Meat, and PFFR Legacy XXX: Soundtrack to the Book)
- Big Black Lips" (from Dark Loud Over Red Meat, and PFFR Legacy XXX: Soundtrack to the Book)

=== Television shows ===
- Wonder Showzen (2005–2006)
- Xavier: Renegade Angel (2007–2009)
- Delocated (2008–2013)
- The Heart, She Holler (2011–2014)
- Neon Joe, Werewolf Hunter (2015–2017)
- Jon Glaser Loves Gear (2016–2019)
- At Home with Amy Sedaris (2017)
- The Shivering Truth (2018–2020)
- Teenage Euthanasia (2021–2023)

=== TV specials ===
- Neon Knome (2008; Remade into a kids show)
- Gigglefudge U.S.A. (2016; in co-production with Everything Is Terrible! and FishBowl Worldwide Media, originally part of Infomercials)
- Hunky Boys Go Ding-Dong (2018; two episodes were produced "Don't Die Alone" and "Terrific Journey")
- Di Bibl (2019; in co-production with Daisy Studio)
- Bad Manners (2020; in co-production with TUbb)
- Rate The Cookie (2020)
- Ballmastrz: Rubicon (2023; in co-production with Studio 4°C)

=== Films ===
- Final Flesh (2009)
- The Hands of God (2012)
