= United We Doth =

Studio album / compilation by PFFR
- Released: July 29, 2003
- Recorded: 2003
- Genre: Electronic rock; neo-psychedelia; experimental rock
- Length: 35:00
- Label: Birdman
- Producer: PFFR

PFFR chronology
Injustice Center (2002)	United We Doth (2003)	Chrome Ghost (2005)

Professional ratings
Review scores
Source	Rating
AllMusic	2.5/5 stars

United We Doth is the third studio album by American art collective PFFR, released on July 29, 2003, by Birdman Records. The album cover art was designed by Scott Hug. The last track is unlisted, the tracks "Japoney Appoe" "Superfine" "P.F.R. Booms" and "Party Ice" originally came from the group's first album "rock rocker rocketh" while "Sparse Party" "Total Dicks" "Feels Like $" "Un Phit Psonique" and "Our Concern" came from their second album "injustice center" released back in 2002.

== Track listing ==
#	Title	Featured guest(s)	Time
1	"Unjackable"	Snoop Dogg	1:20
2	"Superfine"		2:15
3	"Total Dicks"		3:02
4	"Japoney Appoe"		2:06
5	"Un Phit Psonique"		2:05
6	"I Like It Hard"		2:51
7	"Fanfanfantatatasysysy"		2:30
8	"3 Murdered 5 Dead"	Phiiliip	2:38
9	"Hurricane"		4:54
10	"P.F.R. Booms"		2:26
11	"Our Concern"		1:00
12	"Feels Like $"		2:29
13	"Buffalo Bill"		1:21
14	"Party Ice"		2:17
15	"Sparse Party"		1:27
16	(untitled)	Snoop Dogg	0:19
