= Jim Tozzi (PFFR) =

American actor & musician (born 1967)

- Tozzi in NYC 2011
- Born: James Michael Tozzi; October 19, 1967 (age 59); Everett, Massachusetts, U.S.
- Education: Rhode Island School of Design
- Occupations: Artist; director; producer
- Years active: 1991–present
- Spouse: Vezna Gottwald (m. 1994) sep.

James Michael Tozzi (born October 19, 1967) is an American artist, commercial director, producer, voice actor and musician best known for his work on the MTV2 comedy series Wonder Showzen and the Adult Swim show Xavier: Renegade Angel and as a member of the rock band/art collective PFFR.

== Bio ==
Jim Tozzi grew up in Everett, a city to the north of Boston. The most distinctive thing about this town was the smell of freshly roasted peanuts due to the Teddie Peanut Butter factory. The factory's emblem, a grinning cartoon bear with a bucket, would be one of the first influences of advertising on Jim. He went to Everett public school: always an outsider, he preferred drawing weird cartoons and watching monster movies to playing sports.

In his early teens, Jim borrowed a super 8 camera from his Aunt and began experimenting. Lacking a tripod, he would tape the camera down onto the kitchen table and animate various toys, Star Wars figures and clay monsters. He also created a live action series starring his little sister as "Chico" the heavily mustachioed drug dealer who would meet an unlikely demise in every episode. Jim went on to study film and illustration at the Rhode Island School of Design. He continued doing both animated and live action films creating a short film parody of an afterschool special called "Sunday School Girls" which tackled the subject of what Jesus really looked like.

== Career ==
Tozzi moved to New York City and started working at Broadcast Arts inking and painting animation cels. He also started directing music videos for obscure alternative bands. One of the first was for Mercury Rev and featured Ron Jeremy as a floating space traveler. Jim approached Nick at Nite with his reel and some promo ideas; he was brought on to TV Land to come up with a new promo campaign. This campaign conceived, written, and directed with his wife Vezna Gottwald, developed into the award-winning "Twip" series . "Twip" was an imaginary product in which its evolution was traced in commercial parodies from the early 1950s through the 1990s. He served as an animator for the 1992 direct-to-video claymation musical Halloween special Follow That Goblin!. Now as a directing team, the "Tozzi's" signed on to Bob Giraldi's company and began directing spots for Miller Lite, Sprite and Florida's anti-tobacco campaign. The "Tozzi's" split up and Jim went solo; joining M-80 he directed an award-winning campaign for Kellogg's Rice Krispie Treats for Leo Burnett. He went on to direct comedy spots for PlayStation, Nick at Nite and Miller.

== Personal life ==
Tozzi married Vezna Gottwald in 1994, after the two met while studying at Rhode Island School of Design. The couple is now separated.

In his free time Tozzi likes to draw, paint, and take long quiet walks. One of Tozzi's paintings was the basis for the character and show Xavier: Renegade Angel. Tozzi is now signed with them.tv and living in New York.
