= Delocated =

- Genre: Mockumentary; Black comedy Sitcom; Cringe comedy
- Created by: Jon Glaser
- Starring: Jon Glaser; Jacob Kogan; Nadia Dajani; Eugene Mirman; Kevin Dorff; Zoe Lister-Jones; Jerry Minor; Steve Cirbus; Mather Zickel; Yung-I Chang; Ali Farahnakian; Marc Wootton; Janeane Garofalo
- Country of origin: United States
- No. of seasons: 4
- No. of episodes: 29 (and 1 pilot)

Production
- Running time: 11 minutes (2008–09); 22 minutes (2010–13)
- Production companies: PFFR; Williams Street; Unintelligible Grunt (2010–13)

Original release
- Network: Adult Swim
- Release: April 1, 2008 – March 7, 2013

Delocated (or known in the title card as Delocated New York) is an American sitcom that premiered on February 12, 2009, on Adult Swim. The original pilot for the show was aired on April 1, 2008. Jon Glaser plays a man in the Witness Protection Program who moves his family to New York City. The family exploits the situation by starring in a reality TV show about being in the Witness Protection Program (in which, initially, they all wear disguises for their faces and voices; later, only "Jon" does). Eugene Mirman co-stars in all seasons as Yvgeny, a Russian mafia associate and aspiring stand-up comic hired to kill "Jon."

This series is produced by Wonder Showzen and Xavier: Renegade Angel creators and rock band PFFR. It leans decidedly towards deadpan humor while still reflecting the black humor typical of their other shows. It is presented as if it were the fictional reality show which it portrays.

In the first seven episodes, Delocated had an eleven-minute runtime; as of season two, each episode had a twenty-two-minute runtime. The series finale aired as a special, Delocated: The Frrt Identity, on March 7, 2013.

== Plot ==
After testifying as a witness against a Russian mob family, "Jon" and his family are uprooted and start living undercover through the witness protection program. After existing quietly in an anonymous suburb, "Jon" accepts an offer for the family to participate in a reality show based on their current lives. In order to protect their identities from viewers—which could include the Russian gangsters who want him killed for testifying against them—they wear ski masks and have their voices digitally disguised. As part of the deal, the family is relocated to an upscale loft in New York City, where the series will be filmed. Not only does "Jon" find out that the "sweet" loft was not as advertised, his wife "Susan" promptly concludes that the life of a ski-masked, voice-disguised reality TV star is the wrong environment for her and their teenage son "David." Picked up for a second season by the network, "Jon" has little time to celebrate as the vicious Mirminsky family renews its efforts to destroy him and everything he holds dear.

== Cast and characters ==
- "Jon" (Jon Glaser) – The star of the documentary-within-a-reality-show, and a former architect. To prevent the Mirminskis from identifying him from by watching his reality show, he always wears a ski mask to disguise his face, and uses a vocal pitch shifter to disguise his voice. "Jon" is arrogant, delusional, ignorant, inconsiderate of all others, and engages in erratic behavior and schemes that frequently put himself and his family's witness protection status at risk. However, he also occasionally displays acts of incredible kindness and decency, albeit usually in vain. He is an ardent fan of submarine sandwiches.
- "Susan" (Nadia Dajani) – "Jon's" ex-wife, and mother of "Jon's" son, "David." Starved for attention after years of having her needs neglected in her former marriage, she habitually starts romantic/sexual relationships with each subsequent federal agent assigned to protect her and "David."
- "David" (Jacob Kogan) – "Jon" and "Susan's" first and only son. He is usually aggravated by his father's stupidity and lack of parenting skills. After he and "Susan" remove their Witness Protection disguises, he occasionally struggles to adopt a life he can identify with.
- Yvgeny Mirminsky (Eugene Mirman) – An incompetent Russian hit man and stand-up comedian who has been ordered to kill "Jon." His stand-up comedy act consists only of jokes about vodka. Despite this, he actually enjoys a fair amount of recognition from his fan base.
- Sergei Mirminsky (Steve Cirbus) – The ill-tempered and menacing older brother of Yvgeny. After tiring of Yvgeny's repeated failures, the Mirminsky family brings in Sergei to murder "Jon." Unlike the overweight and incompetent Yvgeny, the muscle-bound Sergei is an efficient, sadistic, and ruthless assassin. He spends his time trying to slowly kill "Jon's" "soul" first before literally killing him.
- Mike the Federal Agent (Kevin Dorff) – "Jon's" original bodyguard and best friend.
- Rob the New Federal Agent (Mather Zickel) – "Jon's" second FBI bodyguard and "Susan's" ex-boyfriend.
- TB the Newest Federal Agent (Ali Farahnakian) – "Jon's" third bodyguard. He is a war veteran and some sort of unspecified ex-military mercenary. He is always seen wearing hunting glasses and a Kevlar bulletproof vest. Unlike "Jon's" previous bodyguards, TB shows little emotion and is very serious about his job, generally affirming "Jon's" statements and ideas.
- Qi-qang (Yung-I Chang) – The head of the Wang Cho Chinese mob that "Jon" eventually hires for protection. He is "Jon's" main contact with the group, and is clearly scamming "Jon" out of millions of dollars. The Wang Chos all find "Jon" very annoying, but continue to put up with him because of all the money he blindly gives them.
- The Glaze (Marc Wootton) – "Jon's" personal guru/therapist, brought in season 3 to help "Jon" deal with the death of his ex-wife. He often attempts to advertise himself to the network.
- Kim (Zoe Lister-Jones) – An aspiring artist who became "Jon's" girlfriend after his divorce.
- Susan Shapiro (Janeane Garofalo) – The president of the network who takes over the production duties of the show. "Jon" constantly hits on her in hopes she will date him.
- Mighty Joe Jon: The Black Blond (Jerry Minor) – The executive producer of Delocated during the second season. He also executive produces Yvgeny Mirminsky's reality show. A running joke is that he is repeatedly referred to by his full nickname, even by the FBI and Russian mafia.
- Seth Goldstein (David Beach) – The executive producer of Delocated during the first season. In an attempt to get more hype for the show, he also films Yvgeny's side of the story and eventually gives him a spin-off, even as he clearly tries to kill "Jon."
- Jay (Larry Murphy) – The doorman to "Jon's" building who always wears a fake mustache. "Jon" is impulsively annoyed by him and constantly tells him to shut up and leave, despite how repeatedly kind and supportive Jay is to "Jon's" efforts.
- Ryan (Eli Newell) – Kim's brother who hates "Jon."
- Rick (Brian Kiley) – "Jon's" boss at the copy shop during the first season.
- Todd Barry (Todd Barry) – Playing a fictionalized version of himself, he is a stand-up comedian who is often seen casually playing poker with the Mirminsky crime family at the Russian Social Club, despite the fact that Sergei can't stand him.
- Gregor Mirminsky (Vladimir Bibic) – The imprisoned head of the Mirminsky family, as well as Yvgeny's biological father and Sergei's adoptive father. He is constantly disappointed by Yvgeny's failings and decisions, which is the only thing motivating Yvgeny to try and kill "Jon."
- Pavel (Glenn Fleshler) – Member of the Mirminsky family and the cousin of Sergei and Yvgeny.
- Greg DiPietro (Julian Gamble) – FBI agent assigned to investigating the Mirminsky's threats to "Jon," who is a very realistic and serious man frustrated by "Jon's" antics and influence.
- Bryce Grieke (Andrew Daly) – "Jon's" lawyer. He reluctantly puts up with "Jon," despite the idiotic nature of many of the legal assignments "Jon" has him working on.
- Pete Fontaine (Kurt Braunohler) – The warm-up comedian for many of the network's shows, including their hit sitcom Attitude Stool. "Jon" hires him to "warm-up" his life, in hopes to get Susan Shapiro in a better mood whenever he visits her.
- Trish (Amy Schumer) – Yvgeny's girlfriend in season 3, who lives for drama.
- Mishka (also played by Jon Glaser) – A member of the Mirminsky mob, hired by Yvgeny to pose as "Jon."
- Eun Mi (Sue Jean Kim) – "Jon's" girlfriend during the third season. She constantly points out "Jon's" faults while challenging him to be "exciting."

== Episodes ==
Season	Episodes	Originally released	
Season	Episodes	First released	Last released
1	7	April 1, 2008	March 29, 2009
2	12	August 22, 2010	November 4, 2010
3	10	February 2, 2012	April 5, 2012
Series finale		March 7, 2013	

=== Season 1 (2008–09) ===
No. overall	No. in season	Title	Original release date	Prod. code
1	1	"Pilot"	April 1, 2008	000
“Jon” and his family move to New York City in hopes of finding a new life in the witness relocation program. The family adjusts to new life and changes. Paul Rudd guest stars.
2	2	"Bar Mitzvah"	February 19, 2009	101
“Jon” does not like the theme that “David” has chosen for his Bar Mitzvah.
3	3	"Good Buds"	February 26, 2009	102
“Jon” fires Mike so they can officially be friends, and "Susan" divorces him.
4	4	"Rage Cage"	March 8, 2009	103
“Jon” opens his own business. He also meets a woman who ends up becoming his new girlfriend, Kim.
5	5	"The Soother"	March 15, 2009	104
“Jon” becomes a successful children's lullaby personality while his girlfriend Kim is out of town on a yoga retreat.
6	6	"Member's Only"	March 22, 2009	105
“Jon” joins a country club. A TV movie is made about “Susan's” life.
7	7	"Sick of It!"	March 29, 2009	106
“Jon” gets tired of having cameras following his every move. Michael Shannon guest stars.

=== Season 2 (2010) ===
This season, the runtime of each episode was expanded to 22 minutes (to fit a half-hour TV timeslot) -- twice the length of season one's episodes. The second season began airing August 22, 2010.

No. overall	No. in season	Title	Original release date	Prod. code
8	1	"Decoys"	August 22, 2010	201
The Mirminsky clan steps up its game with a new assassin: Yvgeny's aggressive older brother, Sergei. To ensure "Jon's" safety, the government enacts "Operation: Many 'Jons.'"
9	2	"Conversions"	August 29, 2010	202
"Jon's" life gets even more complicated when his ex-wife converts from Judaism to Catholicism and his son "David" expresses his desire to become a woman.
10	3	"Dog Mayor"	September 5, 2010	203
"Jon" puts himself out there and runs for NYC Dog Mayor even though he's in the witness protection program. One of "Jon's" lies results in the Mirminsky's kidnapping the owner of his favorite sub shop.
11	4	"Mixer"	September 9, 2010	204
"Jon" is invited to a "Witness Protection Convention," while Kim goes undercover to spy on "Jon." Yvgeny and Sergei go on a weekend trip to Idaho.
12	5	"Jon He Does It"	September 16, 2010	205
"Jon" gets his own hidden camera prank show. The show itself ends up being an elaborate prank by Mighty Joe Jon.
13	6	"Mole"	September 23, 2010	206
"Jon" goes undercover to infiltrate the Mirminsky hideaway after a surgery (from the film Face/Off) transforms his appearance to match that of Sergei's.
14	7	"Kim's Krafts"	September 30, 2010	207
Kim opens her own craft store, and her tortilla hats become a surprise hit in the fashion world. "Jon" competes with Yvgeny in a stand-up comedy contest.
15	8	"'Fidence"	October 7, 2010	208
"Jon" helps Jay the doorman recover after he takes a bullet for him. Todd Barry pays off his poker debts to the Mirminsky family.
16	9	"Tap"	October 14, 2010	209
"Jon" meets his long-lost twin brother. Sergei discovers that he was adopted.
17	10	"RV B&B"	October 21, 2010	210
Because of budget cuts, the network will no longer pay for "Jon's" rent. "Jon" opens a Bed & Breakfast inside his RV to make money.
18	11	"David's Girlfriend"	October 28, 2010	211
"David" manages to find himself a brand new girlfriend and "Jon" is incredibly surprised once learns she is a Mirminsky. Meanwhile "Jon," Rob and "Susan's" other FBI ex-boyfriends form the "Good Guys" doo-wop club.
19	12	"Coma"	November 4, 2010	212
"Jon" goes into a coma, and Mighty Joe Jon pulls a ratings stunt by having people try to wake him up.

=== Season 3 (2012) ===
No. overall	No. in season	Title	Original release date	Prod. code
20	1	"Lipples"	February 2, 2012	301
"Jon" has to deal with several major life-changes. Yvgeny falls in love, but the Mirminskys get bad news.
21	2	"Skins"	February 9, 2012	302
"Jon" becomes so obsessed with a potato skins bar that he could lose custody of "David." Appointed the new family boss, Yvgeny has to assert his authority over his men.
22	3	"Midnight Munchingtons"	February 16, 2012	303
"Jon" develops a condition in which he not only sleepwalks, but also cooks fine meals when doing so. This situation is turned into an additional TV show that attracts a groupie (who can't stand "Jon" when he's awake).
23	4	"Camping"	February 23, 2012	304
"Jon" goes camping with his son, sending him off into the wilderness alone as a survival-challenge family tradition. "Jon" is then kidnapped by an elderly couple claiming to belong to a 'militia', who want to use "Jon's" fame to promote their cause. Comedian Todd Barry reprises the role of Todd Barry, getting engaged to his favorite Russian prostitute -- much to Sergei's continued aggravation.
24	5	"Warm-Up"	March 1, 2012	305
"Jon's" obsession with network head Susan Shapiro reaches a new level, and Yvgeny befriends a potato.
25	6	"Sample"	March 8, 2012	306
"Jon" goes on a silent strike upon learning that his catch-phrases are being sampled for dance music songs, without the network paying him for it. Yvgeny spirals out of control after learning his girlfriend, Trish, has been "visiting the Bone Zone" with another man... "Jon."
26	7	"Friend"	March 15, 2012	307
After realizing he has no friends, "Jon" befriends Charlie, who helps him feel better about himself. The Mirminskys frame "Jon" using a fake "Jon," Mishka (also played by Jon Glaser), to flood the internet with sandwich-based porn.
27	8	"TB's Mom"	March 22, 2012	308
TB learns his mom is getting a divorce. Afterwards, to his disgust, The Glaze begins dating his mom. Meanwhile, "Jon" dates a Chinese woman who later turns out to be Korean.
28	9	"Jon Done Gone Nuts"	March 29, 2012	309
"Jon" buys his freedom by living in a human-sized hamster ball. What starts as a truce between the Mirminsky and Wang-Cho families soon ends in misery for everyone.
29	10	"Reunion Show"	April 5, 2012	310
In the epic Season 3 finale, the network allows a reunion special to occur, involving the entire cast of Delocated. Sergei escapes the reunion with "Jon," intending to finally complete the assassination contract once and for all.

=== Series finale (2013) ===
No. overall	Title	Original release date
30	"The Frrt Identity"	March 7, 2013
After being kidnapped by Sergei during the Reunion Show, "Jon" awakes an amnesiac on the New York coast.

== International broadcast ==
In Canada, Delocated previously aired on G4's Adult Digital Distraction block, and currently airs on the Canadian version of Adult Swim.

== Home media ==
The first two seasons were released on DVD in the United States on January 17, 2012. In Australia Madman Entertainment has plans to release the DVD as well according to a DVD sampler.

DVD name	Release date	Ep #	Features
Delocated: The Complete Seasons One & Two	January 17, 2012	19	Commentary, deleted scenes, outtakes and the original demo Jon Glaser made to pitch the series to the network.

The series was also available to stream on Max until December 2023.
