= Jon Philpot =

American film editor

- Occupation: Film editor
- Years active: 2005–present

Jon Philpot is an American film editor. He won a Primetime Emmy Award in the category Outstanding Picture Editing for his work on the television program Hacks.
