= Wonder Showzen =

American adult puppet television series

- Also known as: Kids Show
- Genre: Adult puppeteering; Adult animation; Sketch comedy; Black comedy; Comedy horror; Surreal humour; Parody; Political satire
- Created by: Vernon Chatman; John Lee
- Starring: Vernon Chatman; John Lee; Alyson Levy; Jim Tozzi
- Opening theme: "Kids Show" by PFFR
- Ending theme: "Goodbye Song" by PFFR
- Composer: Chris Anderson
- Country of origin: United States
- Original language: English
- No. of seasons: 2
- No. of episodes: 16 (+ pilot)

Production
- Executive producers: Vernon Chatman; John Lee; Michele Megan Dix; Jesse Ignjatovic; Tom Calderone
- Producers: Ria Finazzo (Note: supervising producer, season 1); Jessica Vitkus (Note: supervising producer, season 2); Lisa M. Thomas (Note: media producer, seasons 1 & 2)
- Production location: New York City
- Cinematography: John Tanzer
- Camera setup: Multi-camera
- Running time: 21–22 minutes
- Production companies: USA Cable Entertainment (season 1); PFFR Productions

Original release
- Network: MTV2; USA Network (pilot)
- Release: March 11, 2005 – May 19, 2006

Wonder Showzen is an American live action/adult animated sketch comedy television series created by Vernon Chatman and John Lee for MTV2. It was produced by PFFR Productions and USA Cable Entertainment, having rejected the series for the USA Network and sold it to MTV Networks.

Described as a children's television series for adults, the show's format is a parody of educational Nick Jr., Disney, and PBS Kids shows such as Blue's Clues, Dora the Explorer, Mickey Mouse Clubhouse, Sesame Street, and The Electric Company (e.g. use of stock footage, puppetry, and clips of children being interviewed). In addition to general controversial comedy, it satirizes politics, religion, war, violence, sex, racism and culture with comedy.

== Production ==
Wonder Showzen was created by Vernon Chatman and John Lee, who originally made an early concept of it back in 1999, and pitched to the USA Network in 2000, but after a few minutes of viewing, executives there quickly concluded it did not fit the network's programming style. However, MTV Networks purchased the series during a re-branding of MTV2, making Wonder Showzen part of its new programming lineup. It aired as part of Sic 'Em Fridays, along with Team Sanchez and Wildboyz. The pilot and early concept were named simply "Kids Show". The Wonder Showzen theme song was also called 'Kids Show'. Reruns of the show also aired on MTV and Comedy Central. Animation services were provided by Raw Power in the first episode and by Augenblick Studios in the rest of the series.

Paramount Home Entertainment released the first season of Wonder Showzen on DVD March 28, 2006. The second season of Wonder Showzen premiered on March 31, 2006, and had its season-two finale starring Clarence on May 19, 2006, on MTV2. This season was released on DVD October 10, 2006, with an easter egg that featured an animation contest. The grand prize was announced as the winner's animation appearing on "the next DVD", but the creators later said a third season was unlikely, and MTV did not renew the series for another season.

== Cast and characters ==
=== Adults ===
- Vernon Chatman (Chauncey/Clarence/Various Voices)
- John Lee (Wordsworth/Him/Various Voices)
- Alyson Levy (Sthugar/Various Voices)
- Jim Tozzi (Various Voices)

=== Kids ===
- Benjamin Krueger
- Evan Seligman
- Taylor Bedlivy
- P.J. Connaire
- Jacob Kogan
- Michael Samms
- Trevor Heins
- Kyle Bogert
- Miles Kath
- Jasmina Lee
- Dominic Payer
- Mike Gibbons
- Alexandra Rose
- Frankie Scapoli
- Ryan Soos
- Brianna Simpkins
- Miles Williams
- Pierce Gidez
- Madison Rose
- Ameerah Moore
- Ryan Simpkins
- Juliet DePaula
- Sam Kaufman

=== Cameos ===
==== Season one ====
- Jon Glaser as Mr. Story in episode 101.
- Flavor Flav as himself in episode 101, The full "Storytime with Flavor Flav" was cut from the broadcast version of the episode. It still appears however on the Season One DVD.
- Dick Gregory as Mr. Sun in episode 103.
- Amy Sedaris as Miss Amy in episode 106.
- Christopher Meloni as the Chewties Spokesman in episode 107.
- Chris Anderson as Koby Teeth in episode 104.
- Madison Rose as herself in episodes 106 and 108.

==== Season two ====
- David Cross as T-Totaled Timbo in episode 203, Hostage in episode 206, and Junkyard Jessip in episode 207.
- Judah Friedlander as Crickey in episodes 203 and 207.
- Jon Glaser as Dr. Rawstein in episodes 203 and 207.
- Darlene Violette as Bettsy Beth Bethanie in episodes 203 and 207.
- Amy Poehler as Miss Mary in episodes 203 and 206.
- John Oates as himself, singing in the song, "War never solves anything" in episode 206.
- Devendra Banhart as himself, singing in the song, "War never solves anything" in episode 206.
- Rick Springfield as himself, singing in the song, "War never solves anything" in episode 206.
- Corin Tucker as herself, singing in the song, "War never solves anything" in episode 206.
- Todd Barry as Barold Q. Mosley in episode 207.
- Zach Galifianakis as Uncle Daddy in episode 207.
- Will Oldham as Pastor Pigmeat in episode 207.
- Heather Lawless as Permanently Pregnant Peggy in episode 203 and 207.
- Barbara Ann Davison as Cousin Grandma Pervis in episode 203 and 207.
- Chris Anderson as Mr. Corn in episode 203

== Recurring segments ==
- Beat Kids – One of the children, most often Trevor, leads a journalistic segment with mostly offensive, humorous questions, ridiculing interviewees at a given venue. The segment appears in almost every episode.
- What's Jim Drawing? – Appeared in episode 202 and 206.
- Horse Apples – A segment in episode 203, which later expanded into an entire episode in 207, that parodies Hee Haw and redneck comedy. The latter episode featured several guest actors.
- Funny/Not Funny – A series of clips, often depicting violent or macabre images, airs with a chorus of children saying either "funny" or "not funny".
- So Now You Know – A parody of "The More You Know", Where kids say questions and a computer shows their answers. It appeared twice on season one and once on season two in episode 205.
- Q&A – A series of children each answer a single question.
- Breaking News – Features the news reporter.
- We Went To... – Children narrate an ostensibly educational trip while old stock film airs.
- Clarence's Movies – Clarence the puppet interviews people on the street on a common theme, usually antagonistically or obnoxiously, which is often reciprocated by violence or threats.
- Story Time – A special guest reads a story to the children. Guests have included Flavor Flav (as himself although it was unaired), Jon Glaser (as Mr. Story), David Cross (as a hostage), and Amy Sedaris (as Ms. Amy).
- Mr. Body – A cartoon segment that parodies the Slim Goodbody character from the Captain Kangaroo television series.
- D.O.G.O.B.G.Y.N. – A cartoon chronicling a dog with the ability to aid in childbirth; part of the title derives from a short form for "obstetrics and gynecology", and part of it comes from the common domesticated dog.

== Episodes ==
=== Series overview ===
Season	Episodes	Originally released	
Season	Episodes	First released	Last released
Early concept		Unaired	
Pilot		Unaired	
1	8	March 11, 2005	April 29, 2005
2	8	March 31, 2006	May 19, 2006

=== Early concept ===
Title	Original release date
"Kids Show"	Unaired (created in 1999)
The 8-minute tape was made for fun by PFFR and they shopped it around different stores. The USA Network eventually saw their tape and gave them money and six months to make a pilot episode. Sketches: Welcome to Kids Show!, Why did the dog cross the street?, Africa (bumper), Arthur: (You Can't Film Here), D.O.G.O.B.G.Y.N. (cartoon), I see all the children (bumper), Funny/Not Funny, Goodbye!

=== Pilot ===
Title	Original release date
"Kids Show"	Unaired (created in 2000)
Unaired pilot episode produced for the USA Network. The Letter N becomes depressed and self-loathing and goes on a quest to find herself. Sketches: Q&A (Where Do Babies Come From?), Arthur (You Can't Film Here), Buck Wild (song), Find 6 Things Wrong!, If I Were a Pony (cartoon), We Went to The Hot Dog Factory, Beat Kids (Bathroom), Funny/Not Funny

=== Season 1 (2005) ===
No. overall	No. in season	Title	Original release date
1	1	"Birth"	March 11, 2005
The letter N, a recovering alcoholic, gets out of rehab but is still depressed and purposeless. Chauncey, the show's main puppet, hires S to find her, and he ends up seducing and impregnating her. She gives birth to a lowercase I, which gives her purpose. The family takes a picture together, spelling out "SiN". Sketches: Q&A (Where Do Babies Come From?), D.O.G.O.B.G.Y.N. (cartoon), I Wanna Learn About Mexico, Kill 'Em With Kindness (cartoon), Clarence (What Are You Running From?), Breaking News (A Cougar from Wyoming), Beat Kids (Butcher), Breaking News (The Letter N Is Still Missing), Brain Busters, Clever Carrot (cartoon), Dear Jesus, When I Get Sad (song), If I Was A Mexican (cartoon), Buck Wild (song), Vietnam Flashback, You're Dead to Me, We Went to the Hot Dog Factory, Follow The Leader (song), Story Time with Mr. Story, Funny/Not Funny
2	2	"Space"	March 18, 2005
Chauncey and a randomly selected child go to space in a rocket ship, but the atheist Chauncey insults God after going into orbit, causing him to blow up Earth. The child convinces him to convert to Christianity, which he does, allowing him to see God. God challenges him to a game of rock paper scissors to restore Earth. Chauncey wins, and God, overcome by the pain of the first loss of his life, commits suicide. Hungry, Chauncey eats his body. Sketches: Don't Litter (cartoon), Clarence (Freedom Of Speech), 5 Jokes in 5 Seconds, A Celebration of White People Throughout History (song), Dear Grandma, Yuck Yuck Goose and His Sidekick His Butt (cartoon), Plastic Surgeons Without Borders (cartoon), Breaking News (Freak Beast Alert Level), Beat Kids (Blood Drive), Q&A (What is Heaven?), Describe Yourself in One Word Or Less, We Went to the Farm
3	3	"Ocean"	March 25, 2005
Unintelligent puppet Him's father dies, and he leaves behind a treasure map that the puppets sail across the ocean to find. They discover that it is a chalice of liquid imagination, which Chauncey drinks and becomes addicted to. He drinks so much that he drains the color out of the world, but Tyler, "America's Most Perfect Child," restores it and reveals that Chauncey had been drinking tap water and the real imagination was inside all of them. Sketches: Tyler Time (I'm Good), Pottymouth (cartoon), Breaking News (A Violent Decrease In Violence), Beat Kids (Horse Racetrack), Slaves! (song), H.O.B.O. Ops (cartoon), Future Hobo, Q&A (What is your Greatest Wish?), Tyler Time (Feeding a Skull), I Think Warthogs Are Beautiful, Smash Your TV and Have Adventures (song), If I Were a Pony (cartoon), Tyler Time (The Difference Between Special and Wonderful), No Brushy, Tyler Time (Tyler), Clarence (Will You Accept Jesus?), Funny/Not Funny
4	4	"Diversity"	April 1, 2005
Numbers and letters declare war on each other, although J and 8 fall in love. They announce their affair in hopes of stopping the fighting, but this only makes both factions angrier. They plan to commit suicide together, but 8 tricks J and lets him die as he declares a victory for the numbers. Sketches: Q&A (What Is Love?), Who's Blown Up Now, Sucka?, Beat Kids (Wall Street), The Boogie Noogie Bunch (cartoon), Numbers and Letters (song), Loser!, Finger Force (cartoon), I Wash My Hands, Global Politics in 30 Seconds (cartoon), Breaking News (Tensions have Literally Explogasmed), So Now You Know (A+), Clarence (Politeness), God's Biggest Boners
5	5	"Nature"	April 8, 2005
Trees and plants begin to falter as Mother Nature decides to undergo a sex change operation, selling nature to a corporation to pay for it. Chauncey visits her to try and change her mind, but instead watches as she removes her female genitalia and prepares to attach male organs, only to die on the operating table. Chauncey has sex with her discarded genitals, reviving her and leaving her with no memory of what happened. Sketches: Q&A (What is the Difference Between Boys and Girls?), Clarence (What Riles You Up, Harlem?), Breaking News (Nature Purchased by CoCOR/Rufus Truthfist), The Little Man Inside My Head (cartoon), So Now You Know (Mating Call), Breaking News (Jesus is Black), Beat Kids (Petting Zoo), Breaking News (CoCOR CEO), Segregation Works! (cartoon), Total Racewar Live, I Don't Ever Wanna Grow Up (song), Breaking News (Truthfist Press Conference), Celebrate Our Differences (cartoon) (song), We Went to the Mint
6	6	"History"	April 15, 2005
Expecting number 1 to show up to the show, Chauncey is angered to discover that 2 is there instead. He berates her, making her decide to commit murder on television to come popular. She kills a beetle, but Chauncey says it is only the second most impressive thing he has seen, and so she decides to commit suicide. She survives with dire need for reconstructive surgery, and Chauncey turns her into 0, ensuring that she will never be on the show again. Sketches: Q&A (Why is America #1?), Chauncey's History Lesson, Clarence (What is Private Space?), Bible Brew (cartoon), Beat Kids (Statue of Liberty), Breaking News (No One Cares/Lack of Protest Protest/The Unflappable Jimmy Flaps), Express Yourself, Number 2 (song), We Went to the Chicken Dinner Factory, Lies My History Teacher Told Me, Tragedy Farms Milk (cartoon), Funny/Not Funny, Story Time with Ms. Amy
7	7	"Health"	April 22, 2005
Wordsworth, a nerdy puppet, gives a lecture on honesty, but Chauncey drops a tree on him to make him stop talking and gets him sent to the hospital. While there, he is diagnosed with "cooties," which grow on his body in painful sores. Him eats one and realizes they are delicious, selling them for a bountiful profit until he has a nightmare that makes him realize he needs to be honest with Wordsworth. He tells him the truth and prepares to kill him, only for Wordsworth to wake up, revealing it to be a nightmare. He realizes he has been crucified, and the entire episode is revealed to have been Chauncey's dream, having been bored to sleep by Wordsworth. Sketches: Q&A (When is it OK to Lie?), D.O.G.O.B.G.Y.N. (cartoon), Clarence (What are Heroes?), Cooties PSA #1, If I Were a Rainbow (cartoon), Chewties Ad #1, One Good Reason, Beat Kids (What's Wrong With Kids Today?), Breaking News (Lashequa May), Everytime You Lie (cartoon), Animal Dance (song), The Electric Chair, Jimagination (cartoon), Cooties PSA #2/Chewties Ad #2
8	8	"Patience"	April 29, 2005
Clarence, a puppet that interviews people on the street about the episode's topic, is doing a lengthy segment on patience when the show broadcasts an announcement apologizing for the slow pace of the episode, playing the entirety of it in reverse before starting a new one about "speed" which is played with most of it sped up. Sketches: Q&A (What is Patience?), Breaking News (The Universe Has Been Raped in the Mindgina), Punctuations Marks with Punk Mark (cartoon), Rad Mark Sez (Patience), Footprints in the Sand, Reverse The Curse (cartoon), Clarence (Patience), Kooky McZanybottom's Kartoon Korner, Kooky McZanybottom's Kartoon Korner (reversed), Clarence (Patience) (reversed), Reverse The Curse (reversed) (cartoon), Hoofprints in the Sand (reversed), Kramdar Sez (Worship) (reversed), Punctuations Marks with Punk Mark (reversed) (cartoon), Breaking News (The Universe Has Been Raped in the Mindgina) (reversed), Q&A (What is Patience?) (reversed), Q&A (What is Speed?), Dear Jesus (Gimme!), Clarence asks Toothless Masons (What do you Eat?), Throw Caution to the Wind (cartoon), Double Speed Double Dutch, Your Friend is a Talking Hotdog, Causer's Aspirin, So Now You Know (Life as a Girl), Beat Kids (Muscles vs. Brains), Pre-School Race War (song), Funny/Not Funny

=== Season 2 (2006) ===
No. overall	No. in season	Title	Original release date
9	1	"Body"	March 31, 2006
The overweight letter P is shamed by Chauncey when she appears on the show to sing, prompting her to get liposuction and have her drained fat disposed of. As she goes on to achieve great success, the fat gains sentience and is initially lonely, although falls in love with a pile of feces. P decides to have her fat shipped around the world to feed the starving, and her fat reluctantly leaves the feces to be shipped out. Sketches: Q&A (What is a Hero?), Mr Body (Lungs) (cartoon), Clarence (Please Don't Film Me), Sgt. Chauncey's Tough Love Boot Camp (Part 1), Curb Your Appetite (cartoon), Beat Kids (Beauty Pageant), Breaking News (Letter P is Under Fire), I'm a Delivery Man (song), Aunt Flo (cartoon), Sgt. Chauncey's Tough Love Boot Camp (Part 2), Don't Mock Gimps (cartoon), 131st Annual Victim Awards, We Spent the Day With the Policemen, Feed the World (song)
10	2	"Time"	April 7, 2006
Chauncey prepares to use a time machine, but a cooler Chauncey from two minutes in the future comes out of it and wows the other puppets, taking them with him an adventure. Angered, Chauncey scours the dump for parts to build another machine with, but instead finds an abandoned baby. He tries to sell it to a Chinese restaurant, but instead gets the idea to try and dig to China when sees that the Chinese calendar is farther in the future than his. He digs straight into Hell, where he gives demons the baby in exchange for a cooler style, and he returns to Future Chauncey evenly matched. The two Chaunceys battle through time, eventually returning to the start of the episode and calling it a draw, only for Chauncey to stab himself in the throat to kill Future Chauncey. Wordsworth points out that he only has two minutes to live, but Chauncey decides it was worth it to have "two minutes of victory." Sketches: Q&A (What Do You Want To Be When You Grow Up?), Beat Kids (Am I Going to Hell?), Wino Bot (cartoon), When I Grow Up (song), What's Jim Drawing?, A Great Moment in Chinese History, Clarence (The Future), I Wanna Be Remembered, Mr. Body (Nervous System) (cartoon), Breaking News (The News is Breaking!), We Went to China, General Competition Through All of Time (song), Dear Jesus, Jeremy Scares Me
11	3	"Knowledge"	April 14, 2006
Chauncey invites the dim-witted Middle America onto the show to make fun of him, and he gets offended and demands to castrate the puppets as penance, the stupidity of which they find so funny that they go along with it. After the procedure, he burns their genitals, the fumes getting the puppets high and allowing Middle America to take over the show. He turns it into "Horse Apples", a lowbrow comedy full of Southern stereotypes, that becomes a big hit and makes him a billionaire. Jealous, Chauncey cuts the brakes on Middle America's hot air balloon, killing him and taking all his money. Sketches: Birth (song), Clarence (Counting), Q&A (What is Happiness?), Chinese Baby Girl Atlantis/McTuff the Crime Cop (cartoon), Humanity Will Remember, Beat Kids (Spaying and Neutering), Horse Apples, Beat Kids (Test Marketing), Breaking News (Hollywood Has Gone Horsewood), We Went to a Newspaper Press, Breaking News (Smells Like Murder)
12	4	"Justice"	April 21, 2006
The puppets pretend to be on a plantation to teach about history, with Chauncey as the slaveowner, female puppet Sthugar as his underage wife, and Wordsworth and Him as slaves. Chauncey orders Him to get rid of their electronics so the episode can be more accurate, but he eats them and transforms into a cyborg that can do intense labor. Sthugar tries to seduce him, but pretends he was trying to rape her when Chauncey catches them. Him's trial devolves into an argument about evolution between Chauncey and Wordsworth, where Chauncey brings a monkey into the courtroom to disprove it but ends up watching it evolve in front of him. Chauncey bribes the jury to vote guilty until God appears to them, blaming the monkey for their confusion, and the puppets lynch it. Sketches: He-Bro (cartoon), What Got Into that Crazy Cat? (song), Beat Kids (Pharmacy), Q&A (How Can We Save the Planet?), Treat Women With Respect (cartoon), Clarence (The Issue), I'm a Communist, Wonder Showzen Premies (cartoon), Thank You Greatest Generation, My Shadow (cartoon)
13	5	"Science"	April 28, 2006
Wordsworth invents a device that allows people to see into dreams, unleashing his own repressed anger on the world. When he refuses to fight it, Chauncey and Him shrink down using a machine Him made and enter Wordsworth's brain, taking control of his body and making him fight his anger. The anger kills him, and Him is forced to give up a peanut to Wordsworth's inner child to revive him. Wordsworth declares that surviving a fight has made him more confident, but is shocked to see Sthugar, his love interest, is marrying his anger. Sketches: Q&A (What Happens When You Die?), Treat Your Body Like a Temple (cartoon), Clarence (What is the American Dream?), Ol' Dusty (cartoon), Mr. Body (Brain) (cartoon), Takin' it Back (song), Piece of Mind, Beat Kids (Can We Ever Laugh Again?), Sthugar and Her Sadness Powered Beanie, Be a Man, Don't Listen to Peer Pressure (cartoon), Breaking News (We Just Received Word of a Story), So Now You Know (Inside an Egg), Girls Can Work (song)
14	6	"Cooperation"	May 5, 2006
The puppets discover that a bootlegged version of their show exists, and Clarence kills the bootleg Clarence when he tries to do his segment in Clarence's spot. The bootlegs declare war and the two shows fight until the Sthugars convince them to stop, and they agree to split up the screen and let their shows run at the same time. A third bootleg show joins them, and all three shows air a cartoon at the same time in which a terminally ill girl requests that the world be destroyed in a nuclear apocalypse, ending all three shows. Sketches: A to Q (What Dumb?), Steal Back (cartoon), Hit Children (How'd It Go In There?), Mushy the Mushroom Cloud (song), Dear Jesus, D.O.G.O.B.G.Y.N. (cartoon), C.Larence (Bootleggers), Mushroom Clouds, Wish and Care Foundation (cartoon), Some of That (song), Breaking News (True Thirts), Story Time With Mr. Hostage, Mr. Body (Tongue) (cartoon), War Never Solves Anything (song), Q&A (What Brings You Peace?)/Blow-Up Doll, Camp Concentration, Clarence (Whassamatta You)/If I Were a Tree (cartoon)/Bootleg, Funny/Not Funny/Swammi Walrus/The Unknown Elephedian, Cooperation (song)/Adults Say the Dumbest Things/Guess the Expression, What's Jim Drawing?/H.O.B.O. Ops (cartoon), Mexican's Show/Miss Mary, Wish Jackpot (cartoon), We Went to the Apocalypse
15	7	"Mathematics"	May 12, 2006
Instead of Wonder Showzen, the episode is a full episode of Horse Apples.
16	8	"Compelling Television"	May 19, 2006
Clarence runs a report on "compelling television" by approaching people and asking them to make quality content. After getting varied reactions from several people, Clarence concludes that compelling television does not exist and commits suicide by jumping into the Hudson River.

== Broadcast ==
It aired in Canada on MTV2, the United Kingdom and Ireland on MTV Two, MTV and TMF, Australia on MTV, Germany and Italy on MTV Entertainment, Latin America on MTV Latin America and in the Baltics on MTV Networks Baltic. In Turkey, it aired on Euro D with graphic scenes cut.

== Reception ==
Matt Groening, creator of The Simpsons and Futurama said "Wonder Showzen is so weirdly funny the top of your head will burst and your skull will fly out."

Cartoon Network's Adult Swim, who PFFR would later make shows for, said "It's a show about kids, for freaks, and we love it."

The first season holds a 100% on Rotten Tomatoes.

Eric André also praised Wonder Showzen, commenting "'Wonder Showzen' is one of my favorite shows of all time. When I first saw it, I thought it was so funny and new and original and edgy and insane and subversive. I didn't know comedy could do that. It redefined what I thought you could do with a TV show." He has even cited the show as an influence behind the writing and editing of The Eric André Show on Adult Swim.

The series was also praised by TV Guide and The New York Times.

== Home releases ==
DVD set	Region 1 release date	Bonus Features
Wonder Showzen: Season One	March 28, 2006	Auditions and Outtakes, Rejected Sketch (Storytime with Flavor Flav), Special Guest Commentaries, 2nd Season Sneek Peek, Locker Poster, Coloring Page, "Japoney Appoe" Music Video.
Wonder Showzen: Season Two	October 10, 2006	More Auditions and Outtakes, Guest Commentaries on select episodes, Rejected Sketch (The Adventures of Scooter McJimmy: Hillbilly Boy Genius), Easter Egg, Storybook.
Wonder Showzen: The Complete Series	March 16, 2021	A re-packaging of the original DVDs without the physical extras, such as the locker poster from season 1 or the storybook in season 2.

A gift set containing both seasons was scheduled for release on December 12, 2006, but it was cancelled. A similar set eventually released on March 16, 2021. The show is also streaming on Paramount+, although episodes "History" and "Time" are missing.
