= List of Curb Your Enthusiasm guest stars =

Many episodes of the American HBO comedy television series Curb Your Enthusiasm feature guest stars. While a lot of these guest appearances are in fictional roles, many celebrities appear as themselves (or fictionalized versions thereof), including actors, comedians and sportspeople.Curb Your Enthusiasm stars Larry David (co-creator of Seinfeld) as himself, with Cheryl Hines as his wife Cheryl, and Jeff Garlin as his best friend and manager Jeff. A number of the guest stars have recurring roles on the show, with some appearing especially frequently, such as Richard Lewis (himself), and Susie Essman (Susie Greene). This list contains all guest appearances on Curb that received a "Guest Star" or "Special Guest Star" billing in the closing credits of at least one episode.

Sometimes an actor might not be credited as a guest star in their first appearance, but will be in subsequent episodes. For example, Susie Essman appears as Susie in several episodes of the first season, but was not credited as a guest star until the second season. The list also contains cameo appearances by celebrities who played themselves, such as Dr. Phil McGraw in the episode "Vehicular Fellatio".

== Season 1 (2000) ==
In the first season, the characters of the show are introduced across a series of mostly isolated episodes, including recurring characters, such as Richard Lewis and Ted Danson. Jeff's wife Susie (Susie Essman) also appears in some of the episodes – however, she has only received guest star credit from season 2 onwards. Julia Louis-Dreyfus (who played Elaine in Seinfeld) also makes an appearance, along with her husband.

=== As themselves ===
Guest star	Known for	Episode(s)
Richard Lewis	comedian	Episode 1, "The Pants Tent"; Episode 4, "The Bracelet"; Episode 9, "Affirmative Action"
Kathy Griffin	actress, comedian	Episode 1, "The Pants Tent"
Ted Danson	actor, husband of Mary Steenburgen	Episode 2, "Ted and Mary"
Mary Steenburgen	actress, wife of Ted Danson	Episode 2, "Ted and Mary"
Julia Louis-Dreyfus	actress, "Elaine" on Seinfeld	Episode 6, "The Wire"
Brad Hall	writer, actor, husband of Julia Louis-Dreyfus	Episode 6, "The Wire"
Ted Harbert	president of NBC Studios	Episode 9, "Affirmative Action"

=== In fictional roles ===
Guest star	Role	Episode(s)
Wayne Federman	Dean Weinstock	Episode 6, "The Wire"
Sofia Milos	Richard's girlfriend	Episode 1, "The Pants Tent"; Episode 9, "Affirmative Action"
Laraine Newman	the director	Episode 10, "The Group"
Oscar Nunez	car park attendant	Episode 5, "Interior Decorator"
Bob Odenkirk	Gil	Episode 3, "Porno Gil"
Tim Bagley	shoe salesman	Episode 2, "Ted and Mary"

== Season 2 (2001) ==
In season two, Cheryl is tired of Larry not working, so he begins to develop a new television show, first with guest stars Jason Alexander and Julia Louis-Dreyfus (George and Elaine on Seinfeld, respectively) as themselves. However, Larry's constant social faux pas ruin all of their chances with every major television network. This season also begins a long-running tradition of Wanda Sykes appearing to chastise Larry whenever he does something seemingly (but not actually) racist. Other notable guest stars playing themselves include Rob Reiner and professional basketball player Shaquille "Shaq" O'Neal in the episode "Shaq".

=== As themselves ===
Guest star	Known for	Episode(s)
Jason Alexander	actor, "George" on Seinfeld	Episode 11, "The Car Salesman"; Episode 12, "Thor"
Richard Lewis	comedian	Episode 11, "The Car Salesman"; Episode 15, "The Thong"; Episode 18, "Shaq"; Episode 19, "The Baptism"
Wanda Sykes	comedian	Episode 12, "Thor"; Episode 20, "The Massage"
Julia Louis-Dreyfus	actress, "Elaine" on Seinfeld	Episode 14, "The Shrimp Incident"; Episode 17, "The Doll"; Episode 20, "The Massage"
Brad Hall	writer, actor, husband of Julia Louis-Dreyfus	Episode 14, "The Shrimp Incident"
Rob Reiner	actor, director, producer	Episode 15, "The Thong"
Shaquille O'Neal	basketball player	Episode 18, "Shaq"
Mike Binder	creator and star of The Mind of the Married Man	Episode 20, "The Massage"

=== In fictional roles ===
Guest star	Role	Episode(s)
Susie Essman	Susie Greene	Episode 12, "Thor"; Episode 17, "The Doll"
Deron McBee	Thor Olson	Episode 12, "Thor"
Ed Asner	Mr. Weiner	Episode 16, "The Acupuncturist"
Rita Wilson	Anne Michaelson	Episode 17, "The Doll"
Paul Dooley	Cheryl's father	Episode 18, "Shaq"
Doug Benson	Barry’s cousin	Episode 16, “The Acupuncturist”

== Season 3 (2002) ==
In season three, Larry, along with Ted Danson and Michael York, invests in a restaurant enterprise which finally opens despite many mishaps, most of which are Larry's fault. Director Martin Scorsese appears in a short story arc, in which Larry is given a film role. The episode "The Terrorist Attack" features singer-songwriter Alanis Morissette, as well as actors Paul Reiser and Martin Short.

=== As themselves ===
Guest star	Known for	Episode(s)
Ted Danson	actor	Episode 21, "Chet's Shirt"; Episode 23, "Club Soda and Salt"; Episode 24, "The Nanny from Hell"; Episode 27, "The Corpse-Sniffing Dog"
Wanda Sykes	comedian	Episode 22, "The Benadryl Brownie"; Episode 25, "The Terrorist Attack"; Episode 28, "Krazee-Eyez Killa"
Michael York	actor	Episode 21, "Chet's Shirt"; Episode 24, "The Nanny from Hell"; Episode 27, "The Corpse-Sniffing Dog"; Episode 30, "The Grand Opening"
Richard Lewis	comedian	Episode 22, "The Benadryl Brownie"; Episode 24, "The Nanny from Hell"; Episode 26, "The Special Section"; Episode 30, "The Grand Opening"
Joan Rivers	comedian, actress	Episode 22, "The Benadryl Brownie"
Alanis Morissette	singer-songwriter	Episode 25, "The Terrorist Attack"
Paul Reiser	comedian, actor	Episode 25, "The Terrorist Attack"
Martin Short	comedian, actor	Episode 25, "The Terrorist Attack"
Martin Scorsese	film director	Episode 26, "The Special Section"; Episode 28, "Krazee-Eyez Killa"

==== As themselves, not credited as guest star ====
Guest appearance by	Known for	Episodes
Lou DiMaggio (Note: Lou DiMaggio played himself, and was an investor for the restaurant. He was credited as "Investor.")	comedian, actor	Episode 21, "Chet's Shirt"; Episode 24, "The Nanny from Hell"; Episode 27, "The Corpse-Sniffing Dog"; Episode 30, "The Grand Opening"

=== In fictional roles ===
Guest star	Role	Episode(s)
Susie Essman	Susie Greene	Episode 22, "The Benadryl Brownie"; Episode 24, "The Nanny from Hell"; Episode 27, "The Corpse-Sniffing Dog"; Episode 28, "Krazee-Eyez Killa"; Episode 29, "Mary, Joseph and Larry"; Episode 30, "The Grand Opening"
Cheri Oteri	Martine	Episode 24, "The Nanny from Hell"
Tim Kazurinsky	Hugh Mellon	Episode 24, "The Nanny from Hell"
Shelley Berman	Nat David	Episode 26, "The Special Section"; Episode 30, "The Grand Opening"
Richard Kind	Cousin Andy	Episode 26, "The Special Section"
Paul Dooley	Cheryl's father	Episode 29, "Mary, Joseph, and Larry"; Episode 30, "The Grand Opening"
Paul Sand	Guy Bernier	Episode 30, "The Grand Opening"
Paul Willson	Andy Portico	Episode 30, "The Grand Opening"
David Koechner	Joseph	Episode 29, "Mary, Joseph, and Larry"

== Season 4 (2004) ==
In season four, Mel Brooks casts Larry as the lead in his hit musical The Producers. Many episodes revolve around preparing for the opening night of the show, with the hour-long season finale taking place at the musical's premiere. Larry is first cast alongside Ben Stiller, who is later replaced by David Schwimmer. Both Stiller's wife, Christine Taylor, and Mel Brooks' wife, Anne Bancroft guest star during the season, the latter in one of her latest appearances before her death. Professional basketball player Muggsy Bogues appears in the episode "The Surrogate". Several cast and crew members of the real life Producers production also appear, including the musical's orchestra and ensemble.

=== As themselves ===
Guest star	Known for	Episode(s)
Mel Brooks	writer and director of The Producers	Episode 31, "Mel's Offer"; Episode 33, "The Blind Date"; Episode 37, "The Surrogate"; Episode 40, "Opening Night"
Ben Stiller	actor	Episode 31, "Mel's Offer"; Episode 32, "Ben's Birthday Party"; Episode 33, "The Blind Date"
Christine Taylor	actress, wife of Ben Stiller	Episode 31, "Mel's Offer"; Episode 32, "Ben's Birthday Party"; Episode 33, "The Blind Date"
Cady Huffman	actress, "Ulla" in The Producers	Episode 31, "Mel's Offer"; Episode 32, "Ben's Birthday Party"; Episode 33, "The Blind Date"; Episode 40, "Opening Night"
Richard Lewis	comedian	Episode 32, "Ben's Birthday Party"; Episode 37, "The Surrogate"
Ted Danson	actor	Episode 34, "The Weatherman"
David Schwimmer	actor	Episode 35, "The 5 Wood"; Episode 37, "The Surrogate"; Episode 40, "Opening Night"
Muggsy Bogues	basketball player	Episode 37, "The Surrogate"
Wanda Sykes	comedian	Episode 37, "The Surrogate"
Anne Bancroft	actress, wife of Mel Brooks	Episode 40, "Opening Night"
Nathan Lane	actor, "Max Bialystock" in The Producers	Episode 40, "Opening Night"
Susan Stroman	director and choreographer of The Producers	Episode 40, "Opening Night"

==== As themselves, not credited as guest star ====
Guest appearance by	Known for	Episode
Lewis J. Stadlen	actor, "Max Bialystock" in The Producers	Episode 31, "Mel's Offer"
Stephen Colbert	comedian, TV Host	Episode 40, "Opening Night" (patron who spooks Larry after an argument outside the theater)
Don Stephenson	actor, "Leo Bloom" in The Producers	Episode 31, "Mel's Offer"
The Producers ensemble	the ensemble of the musical	Episode 40, "Opening Night"
The Producers orchestra	orchestra of the musical	Episode 40, "Opening Night"
Jerry Seinfeld (Note: Jerry Seinfeld is in the crowd on the musical's opening night. Uncredited cameo appearance.)	co-creator and star of Seinfeld	Episode 40, "Opening Night"

=== In fictional roles ===
Guest star	Role	Episode(s)
Philip Baker Hall	Dr. Morrison	Episode 31, "Mel's Offer"
Paul Mazursky	Norm	Episode 31, "Mel's Offer"; Episode 33, "The Blind Date"; Episode 35, "The 5 Wood"; Episode 40, "Opening Night"
Susie Essman	Susie Greene	Episode 32, "Ben's Birthday Party"; Episode 33, "The Blind Date"; Episode 34, "The Weatherman"; Episode 35, "The 5 Wood"; Episode 38, "Wandering Bear"; Episode 39, "The Survivor"
Anton Yelchin	Cheryl's cousin, Stewart	Episode 33, "The Blind Date"
Moon Zappa	Haboos	Episode 33, "The Blind Date"
Shelley Berman	Nat David	Episode 34, "The Weatherman"; Episode 36, "The Car Pool Lane"; Episode 39, "The Survivor"
Bob Einstein (Note: Bob Einstein first appeared as Marty Funkhouser in episode 34, "The Weatherman", but was not credited as guest star until his next appearance.)	Marty Funkhouser	Episode 35, "The 5 Wood"; Episode 36, "The Car Pool Lane"
Saul Rubinek	Dr. Saul Funkhouser	Episode 34, "The Weatherman"; Episode 35, "The 5 Wood"
Melissa McCarthy	salesperson	Episode 37, "The Surrogate"
Russel Means	Wandering Bear	Episode 38, "Wandering Bear"
Paul Dooley	Cheryl's father	Episode 39, "The Survivor"
Gina Gershon	Anna	Episode 39, "The Survivor"
Richard Kind	Cousin Andy	Episode 40, "Opening Night"
Yvette Nicole Brown	Stewardess	Episode 40, "Opening Night"
Jorge Garcia	drug dealer	Episode 36, "The Car Pool Lane"

== Season 5 (2005) ==
In season five, Larry's friend Richard Lewis gets very ill and requires a kidney transplant. Larry is a match, but he spends the season looking for other sources of a kidney for Lewis. Also in season five, Larry suspects he may be adopted and embarks on a search to find his biological parents. Celebrities playing themselves this season include Kevin Nealon and George Lopez, as well as professional golfer Gary Player. The episode "The Smoking Jacket" is partly set at the Playboy Mansion, and Playboy founder Hugh Hefner appears. A special segment in the season finale features Dustin Hoffman and Sacha Baron Cohen as Larry's "guides".

=== As themselves ===
Guest star	Known for	Episode(s)
Richard Lewis	comedian	Episode 41, "The Larry David Sandwich"; Episode 45, "Lewis Needs a Kidney"; Episode 48, "The Ski Lift"; Episode 50, "The End"
Ted Danson	actor	Episode 41, "The Larry David Sandwich"
Kevin Nealon	actor, comedian	Episode 44, "Kamikaze Bingo"
Hugh Hefner	founder of Playboy magazine, owner of the Playboy Mansion	Episode 46, "The Smoking Jacket"
Gary Player	professional golfer	Episode 46, "The Smoking Jacket"
George Lopez	comedian, actor, talk show host	Episode 48, "The Ski Lift"
Bobbi Sue Luther	Bobbi Sue	Episode 46, "The Smoking Jacket"
Holly Madison	Holly	Episode 46, "The Smoking Jacket"
Kendra Wilkinson	Kendra	Episode 46, "The Smoking Jacket"
Bridget Marquardt	Bridget	Episode 46, "The Smoking Jacket"

==== As themselves, not credited as guest star ====
Guest appearance by	Known for	Episode
Rosie O'Donnell	stand-up comedian, actress	Episode 42, "The Bowtie"

=== In fictional roles ===
Guest star	Role	Episode(s)
Shelley Berman	Nat David	Episode 41, "The Larry David Sandwich"; Episode 43, "The Christ Nail"; Episode 44, "Kamikaze Bingo"; Episode 46, "The Smoking Jacket"; Episode 47, "The Seder"; Episode 50, "The End"
Susie Essman	Susie Greene	Episode 41, "The Larry David Sandwich"; Episode 42, "The Bowtie"; Episode 43, "The Christ Nail"; Episode 45, "Lewis Needs a Kidney"; Episode 47, "The Seder"; Episode 48, "The Ski Lift"; Episode 50, "The End"
Kenneth Kimmons	Dr. Sewell	Episode 41, "The Larry David Sandwich"
Ed O'Ross	Leo	Episode 41, "The Larry David Sandwich"
Mayim Bialik	Jodi Funkhouser	Episode 42, "The Bowtie"
Bob Einstein	Marty Funkhouser	Episode 42, "The Bowtie"; Episode 45, "Lewis Needs a Kidney"
Mekhi Phifer	Omar Jones	Episode 42, "The Bowtie"; Episode 45, "Lewis Needs a Kidney"; Episode 48, "The Ski Lift"; Episode 50, "The End"
Paul Dooley	Cheryl's Dad	Episode 43, "The Christ Nail"
Julie Payne	Cheryl's Mom	Episode 43, "The Christ Nail"
Mindy Kaling	Richard Lewis's Assistant	Episode 45, "Lewis Needs a Kidney"
Frank Whaley	Pete Hagen	Episode 45, "Lewis Needs a Kidney"
Bill Saluga	Louis Lewis	Episode 45, "Lewis Needs a Kidney" (picture); Episode 46, "The Smoking Jacket"; Episode 48, "The Ski Lift"; Episode 50, "The End"
Richard Kind	Andy	Episode 46, "The Smoking Jacket"
Rob Corddry	Rick Leftowitz	Episode 47, "The Seder"
Bobby Lee	Sung	Episode 49, "The Korean Bookie"
Dustin Hoffman	Guide #1	Episode 50, "The End"
Sacha Baron Cohen	Guide #2	Episode 50, "The End"
June Squibb	Larry's Mother	Episode 50, "The End"
Bea Arthur	Also Larry's Mother	Episode 50, "The End"

== Season 6 (2007) ==
Season six is built around Cheryl persuading Larry to take in a black family that is left homeless after a major Gulf Coast hurricane. Special guest stars playing themselves include Senator Barbara Boxer, Lucy Lawless (who played the title character in Xena: Warrior Princess), Ben Stiller, and professional tennis player John McEnroe. The season introduces Vivica A. Fox as Loretta and J. B. Smoove as Leon.

=== As themselves ===
Guest star	Known for	Episode(s)
Richard Lewis	comedian	Episode 51, "Meet the Blacks"; Episode 53, "The Ida Funkhouser Roadside Memorial"; Episode 54, "The Lefty Call"; Episode 57, "The TiVo Guy"; Episode 60, "The Bat Mitzvah"
Ted Danson	actor, husband of Mary Steenburgen	Episode 51, "Meet the Blacks"; Episode 52, "The Anonymous Donor"; Episode 55, "The Freak Book"; Episode 57, "The TiVo Guy"
Mary Steenburgen	actress, wife of Ted Danson	Episode 51, "Meet the Blacks"; Episode 52, "The Anonymous Donor"; Episode 55, "The Freak Book"
Senator Barbara Boxer	United States Senator from California	Episode 52, "The Anonymous Donor"
John McEnroe	professional tennis player	Episode 55, "The Freak Book"
Lucy Lawless	actress, "Xena" in Xena: Warrior Princess	Episode 57, "The TiVo Guy"
Ben Stiller	actor	Episode 58, "The N Word"
John Legend	musician	Episode 60, "The Bat Mitzvah"

=== In fictional roles ===
Guest star	Role	Episode(s)
Susie Essman	Susie Greene	Episode 51, "Meet the Blacks"; Episode 52, "The Anonymous Donor"; Episode 53, "The Ida Funkhouser Roadside Memorial"; Episode 54, "The Lefty Call"; Episode 55, "The Freak Book"; Episode 56, "The Rat Dog"; Episode 57, "The TiVo Guy"; Episode 58, "The N Word"; Episode 59, "The Therapists"; Episode 60, "The Bat Mitzvah"
Vivica A. Fox	Loretta Black	Episode 51, "Meet the Blacks"; Episode 52, "The Anonymous Donor"; Episode 53, "The Ida Funkhouser Roadside Memorial"; Episode 54, "The Lefty Call"; Episode 56, "The Rat Dog"; Episode 57, "The TiVo Guy"; Episode 58, "The N Word"; Episode 59, "The Therapists"; Episode 60, "The Bat Mitzvah"
Mayim Bialik	Jodi Funkhouser	Episode 53, "The Ida Funkhouser Roadside Memorial"; Episode 57, "The TiVo Guy"
Bob Einstein	Marty Funkhouser	Episode 51, "Meet the Blacks"; Episode 53, "The Ida Funkhouser Roadside Memorial"; Episode 57, "The TiVo Guy"; Episode 59, "The Therapists"; Episode 60, "The Bat Mitzvah"
J. B. Smoove (Note: J. B. Smoove first appeared as Leon in episode 52, "The Anonymous Donor", but was not credited as guest star until his next appearance.)	Leon	Episode 52, "The Anonymous Donor"; Episode 54, "The Lefty Call"; Episode 56, "The Rat Dog"; Episode 57, "The TiVo Guy"; Episode 58, "The N Word"; Episode 59, "The Therapists"; Episode 60, "The Bat Mitzvah"
Gina Gershon	Anna	Episode 52, "The Anonymous Donor"
Ken Jeong	pedestrian	Episode 52, "The Anonymous Donor"
Shelley Berman	Nat David	Episode 56, "The Rat Dog"
Tim Meadows	Hal	Episode 56, "The Rat Dog"
Steve Coogan	Dr. Bright	Episode 59, "The Therapists"
Michael McKean	Matt Tessler	Episode 60, "The Bat Mitzvah"

== Season 7 (2009) ==
Most of season seven is centered on creating a Seinfeld reunion show with the original cast, while Larry is trying to get back with Cheryl. All four stars of Seinfeld – Jerry Seinfeld, Julia Louis-Dreyfus, Jason Alexander and Michael Richards – appear as special guest stars in a number of episodes, including the season finale, in which an all-new Seinfeld segment is shown. Actors who played recurring roles on Seinfeld also appear in the episode "The Table Read". Celebrities who portrayed themselves include Meg Ryan, David Spade, Christian Slater, and Rosie O'Donnell.

=== As themselves ===
Guest star	Known for	Episode(s)
Richard Lewis	comedian	Episode 61, "Funkhouser's Crazy Sister"; Episode 62, "Vehicular Fellatio"; Episode 66, "The Bare Midriff"
Wanda Sykes	comedian	Episode 61, "Funkhouser's Crazy Sister"
Jerry Seinfeld*	comedian, co-creator of and "Jerry" on Seinfeld	Episode 63, "The Reunion"; Episode 66, "The Bare Midriff"; Episode 68, "Officer Krupke"; Episode 69, "The Table Read"; Episode 70, "Seinfeld"
Julia Louis-Dreyfus*	actress, "Elaine" on Seinfeld	Episode 63, "The Reunion"; Episode 66, "The Bare Midriff"; Episode 69, "The Table Read"; Episode 70, "Seinfeld"
Jason Alexander*	actor, "George" on Seinfeld	Episode 63, "The Reunion"; Episode 69, "The Table Read"; Episode 70, "Seinfeld"
Michael Richards*	actor, "Kramer" on Seinfeld	Episode 63, "The Reunion"; Episode 69, "The Table Read"; Episode 70, "Seinfeld"
Meg Ryan	actress	Episode 63, "The Reunion"
David Spade	actor	Episode 63, "The Reunion"
Ted Danson	actor, husband of Mary Steenburgen	Episode 64, "The Hot Towel"; Episode 65, "Denise Handicapped"
Mary Steenburgen	actress, wife of Ted Danson	Episode 64, "The Hot Towel"
Christian Slater	actor	Episode 64, "The Hot Towel"
Rosie O'Donnell	stand-up comedian, actress	Episode 65, "Denise Handicap"

* "Special Guest Star" credit.

==== As themselves, not credited as guest star ====
Guest appearance by	Known for	Episode
Lou DiMaggio	comedian, actor	Episode 61, "Funkhouser's Crazy Sister"
Dr. Phil McGraw	host of Dr. Phil	Episode 62, "Vehicular Fellatio"
Chee-Yun	violinist	Episode 65, "Denise Handicapped"
Marc Hirschfeld	casting director on Seinfeld	Episode 68, "Officer Krupke"
Estelle Harris	actress, "Estelle Costanza" on Seinfeld	Episode 69, "The Table Read"
Steve Hytner	actor, "Kenny Bania" on Seinfeld	Episode 69, "The Table Read"
Wayne Knight	actor, "Newman" on Seinfeld	Episode 69, "The Table Read"

=== In fictional roles ===
Guest star	Role	Episode(s)
Susie Essman	Susie Greene	Episode 61, "Funkhouser's Crazy Sister"; Episode 62, "Vehicular Fellatio"; Episode 63, "The Reunion"; Episode 64, "The Hot Towel"; Episode 65, "Denise Handicapped"; Episode 68, "Officer Krupke"; Episode 70, "Seinfeld"
Vivica A. Fox	Loretta Black	Episode 61, "Funkhouser's Crazy Sister"; Episode 62, "Vehicular Fellatio"
J. B. Smoove	Leon	Episode 61, "Funkhouser's Crazy Sister"; Episode 62, "Vehicular Fellatio"; Episode 65, "Denise Handicapped"; Episode 69, "The Table Read"
Ellia English (Note: Ellia English appeared as Auntie Rae in several episodes of season 6, but was only promoted to guest star status in season 7.)	Auntie Rae	Episode 61, "Funkhouser's Crazy Sister"; Episode 62, "Vehicular Fellatio"
Bob Einstein	Marty Funkhouser	Episode 61, "Funkhouser's Crazy Sister"; Episode 67, "The Black Swan"; Episode 69, "The Table Read"
Catherine O'Hara	Bam Bam	Episode 61, "Funkhouser's Crazy Sister"
Sharon Lawrence	Dr. Trundle	Episode 62, "Vehicular Fellatio"
Lolita Davidovich	Beverly	Episode 62, "Vehicular Fellatio"
Wayne Federman (Note: Wayne Federman appeared as Dean Weinstock in episode 6, "The Wire" (season 1), but was not credited as guest star.)	Dean Weinstock	Episode 62, "Vehicular Fellatio"
Philip Baker Hall	Dr. Morrison	Episode 64, "The Hot Towel"
Sherry Stringfield	Mary Jane Porter	Episode 64, "The Hot Towel"
Anita Barone	Denise	Episode 65, "Denise Handicapped"
Jamie Denbo	Jamie Fowler	Episode 65, "Denise Handicapped"
Amy Pietz	Wendy	Episode 65, "Denise Handicapped"
Jillian Bell	Maureen	Episode 66, "The Bare Midriff"
Shelley Berman	Nat David	Episode 67, "The Black Swan"
Richard Kind	Cousin Andy	Episode 67, "The Black Swan"
Paul Mazursky	Norm	Episode 67, "The Black Swan"
Carol Leifer	Carol	Episode 68, "Officer Krupke"
John Schneider	Dennis	Episode 68, "Officer Krupke"
Elisabeth Shue	Virginia	Episode 68, "Officer Krupke"; Episode 70, "Seinfeld"

== Season 8 (2011) ==
Season 8 continues to follow Larry's single life. At the midpoint of the season, the main characters all move to New York City, where the rest of the season is set. The premiere episode is the only one that features Cheryl Hines (Cheryl David), and subsequent episodes this season do not credit her as part of the main cast. Starting with this season however, Susie Essman (Susie Green) has been promoted to the main cast of the show. Prominent celebrities that played themselves in this season include Ricky Gervais, Rosie O'Donnell, and Michael J. Fox. Ana Gasteyer played Larry's date Jennifer in two episodes.

=== As themselves ===
Guest star	Known for	Episode(s)
Richard Lewis	comedian	Episode 72, "The Safe House"; Episode 74, "The Smiley Face"; Episode 75, "Vow of Silence"
Ricky Gervais	comedian, actor	Episode 76, "The Hero"
Rosie O'Donnell	stand-up comedian, actress	Episode 77, "The Bi-Sexual"
Wanda Sykes	comedian	Episode 78, "Car Periscope"
Michael J. Fox	actor	Episode 80, "Larry vs. Michael J. Fox"

==== As themselves, not credited as guest star ====
Guest appearance by	Known for	Episode
Bill Buckner	baseball player	Episode 79, "Mister Softee"
Mookie Wilson	baseball player	Episode 79, "Mister Softee"
Michael Bloomberg	Mayor of New York	Episode 80, "Larry vs. Michael J. Fox"

=== In fictional roles ===
Guest star	Role	Episode(s)
J. B. Smoove	Leon	Episode 71, "The Divorce"; Episode 72, "The Safe House"; Episode 77, "The Bi-Sexual"; Episode 79, "Mister Softee"; Episode 80, "Larry vs. Michael J. Fox"
Bob Einstein	Marty Funkhouser	Episode 71, "The Divorce"; Episode 72, "The Safe House"; Episode 73, "Palestinian Chicken"; Episode 75, "Vow of Silence"
Gary Cole	Joe O'Donnell	Episode 71, "The Divorce"
Paul F. Tompkins	Andrew Berg	Episode 71, "The Divorce"
Scott Aukerman		Episode 73, "Palestinian Chicken"
Michael Gross	Dr. Rivkin	Episode 74, "The Smiley Face"
Michael McKean	Tessler	Episode 75, "Vow of Silence"
Samantha Mathis	Donna	Episode 76, "The Hero"
Chris Parnell	Hank	Episode 76, "The Hero"
Amy Landecker	Jane	Episode 77, "The Bi-Sexual"
Aida Turturro	Gabby	Episode 78, "Car Periscope"
Robert Smigel	Yari	Episode 79, "Mister Softee
Ana Gasteyer	Jennifer	Episode 79, "Mister Softee"; Episode 80, "Larry vs. Michael J. Fox"
Michaela Watkins	Saundra	Episode 72, "The Safe House"
Jon Glaser	Doorman	Episode 80, "Larry vs. Michael J. Fox"

== Season 9 (2017) ==
In this season, J. B. Smoove (Leon Black) joins and Cheryl Hines (Cheryl) re-joins the main cast.

=== As themselves ===
Guest star	Known for	Episode(s)
Elizabeth Banks	actress	Episode 83, "A Disturbance in the Kitchen"
Ted Danson	actor	Episode 81, "Foisted!"; Episode 82, "The Pickle Gambit"; Episode 83, "A Disturbance in the Kitchen"; Episode 84, "Running with the Bulls"; Episode 89, "The Shucker"; Episode 90, "Fatwa!"
Jimmy Kimmel	comedian, late night host	Episode 81, "Foisted!"
Richard Lewis	comedian	Episode 81, "Foisted!"; Episode 84, "Running with the Bulls"; Episode 85, "Thank You for Your Service"; Episode 86, "The Accidental Text on Purpose"; Episode 90, "Fatwa!"
Lawrence O'Donnell	political commentator	Episode 81, "Foisted!"
Salman Rushdie	author	Episode 83, "A Disturbance in the Kitchen"
Judge Judy Sheindlin	television personality	Episode 89, "The Shucker"
Mary Steenburgen	actress	Episode 82, "The Pickle Gambit"
F. Murray Abraham	actor	Episode 90, "Fatwa!"
Lin-Manuel Miranda	composer, actor	Episode 89, "The Shucker"; Episode 90, "Fatwa!"

=== In fictional roles ===
Guest star	Role	Episode(s)
Carrie Brownstein	Mara	Episode 81, "Foisted!"
Julie Goldman	Betty	Episode 81, "Foisted!"
Nasim Pedrad	Numa	Episode 81, "Foisted!"
Jim Rash	hotel day manager	Episode 82, "The Pickle Gambit"
Bob Einstein	Marty Funkhouser	Episode 82, "The Pickle Gambit"; Episode 84, "Running with the Bulls"; Episode 86, "The Accidental Text on Purpose"; Episode 88, "Never Wait For Seconds!"; Episode 90, "Fatwa!"
Stephen Rannazzisi	chef	Episode 83, "A Disturbance in the Kitchen"
Damon Wayans Jr.	cop	Episode 83, "A Disturbance in the Kitchen"
Gary Anthony Williams	judge	Episode 83, "A Disturbance in the Kitchen"
Bryan Cranston	Dr. Templeton	Episode 84, "Running with the Bulls"
Katie Aselton	Jean	Episode 85, "Thank You for Your Service"
Chet Hanks	Victor Chesnick	Episode 85, "Thank You for Your Service"; Episode 90, "Fatwa!"
Joe Regalbuto	Sal	Episode 85, "Thank You for Your Service"
Ed Begley Jr.	Dr. Winocur	Episode 86, "The Accidental Text on Purpose"
Andrea Savage	Rhonda	Episode 86, “The Accidental Text on Purpose”
Elizabeth Perkins	Marilyn	Episode 86, "The Accidental Text on Purpose"; Episode 88, "Never Wait for Seconds!"
Lauren Graham	Bridget	Episode 87, "Namaste"; Episode 88, "Never Wait for Seconds!"; Episode 89, "The Shucker"
America Ferrera	Lin's wife	Episode 89, "The Shucker"
Nick Offerman	Cody Gutcher	Episode 90, "Fatwa!"
Flula Borg	Ernst	Episode 90, "Fatwa!"

== Season 10 (2020) ==
=== As themselves ===
Guest star	Known for	Episode(s)
Laverne Cox	actress	Episode 93, "Artificial Fruit"
Ted Danson	actor	Episode 91, "Happy New Year"; Episode 92, "Side Sitting"; Episode 93, "Artificial Fruit"; Episode 94, "You're Not Going to Get Me To Say Anything Bad About Mickey"; Episode 95, "Insufficient Praise"; Episode 97, "The Ugly Section"; Episode 99, "Beep Panic"
Savannah Guthrie	journalist, co-host of Today	Episode 100, "The Spite Store"
Jon Hamm	actor	Episode 98, "Elizabeth, Margaret and Larry"
Jonah Hill	actor	Episode 100, "The Spite Store"
Hoda Kotb	journalist, co-host of Today	Episode 100, "The Spite Store"
Mila Kunis	actress	Episode 100, "The Spite Store"
Christine Lahti	actress	Episode 93, "Artificial Fruit"
Richard Lewis	comedian	Episode 91, "Happy New Year"; Episode 92, "Side Sitting"; Episode 93, "Artificial Fruit"; Episode 95, "Insufficient Praise"; Episode 97, "The Ugly Section"; Episode 98, "Elizabeth, Margaret and Larry"; Episode 99, "Beep Panic"
Josh Mankiewicz	journalist, NBC News	Episode 100, "The Spite Store"
Chris Martin	musician	Episode 96, "The Surprise Party"
Clive Owen	actor	Episode 95, "Insufficient Praise"
Sean Penn	actor	Episode 100, "The Spite Store"
Phil Rosenthal	producer	Episode 91, "Happy New Year"

=== In fictional roles ===
Guest star	Role	Episode(s)
Saverio Guerra	Mocha Joe	Episode 91, "Happy New Year"; Episode 92, "Side Sitting"; Episode 93, "Artificial Fruit"; Episode 94, "You're Not Going to Get Me To Say Anything Bad About Mickey"; Episode 95, "Insufficient Praise" Episode 99, "Beep Panic"; Episode 100, "The Spite Store"
Fred Armisen	Wally	Episode 96, "The Surprise Party"
Chaz Bono	Joey Funkhouser	Episode 100, "The Spite Store"
Jon Daly	mailman	Episode 92, "Side Sitting"; Episode 95, "Insufficient Praise"
Megan Ferguson	Alice	Episode 91, "Happy New Year"; Episode 92, "Side Sitting"; Episode 93, "Artificial Fruit"; Episode 100, "The Spite Store""
Isla Fisher	Carol	Episode 95, "Insufficient Praise"
Abbi Jacobson	Diane	Episode 99, "Beep Panic"
Richard Kind	Cousin Andy	Episode 92, "Side Sitting"; Episode 93, "Artificial Fruit"
Jane Krakowski	Veronica	Episode 97, “The Ugly Section”
Nick Kroll	restaurant manager	Episode 97, "The Ugly Section"
Esai Morales	Francisco	Episode 93, "Artificial Fruit"
Kaitlin Olson	Becky	Episode 98, "Elizabeth, Margaret and Phillip"
Timothy Olyphant	Mickey	Episode 94, "You're Not Going to Get Me To Say Anything Bad About Mickey"
Lennon Parham	Randi	Episode 91, "Happy New Year"
Megyn Price	Donna	Episode 94, "You're Not Going to Get Me To Say Anything Bad About Mickey"
Teri Polo	Rita	Episode 92, "Side Sitting"
Ben Shenkman	Roger Swindell	Episode 92, "Side Sitting"; Episode 93, "Artificial Fruit"; Episode 94, "You're Not Going to Get Me To Say Anything Bad About Mickey"
Alan Tudyk	Boris	Episode 96, "The Surprise Party"
Vince Vaughn	Freddie Funkhouser	Episode 95, "Insufficient Praise"; Episode 96, "The Surprise Party" Episode 99, "Beep Panic"; Episode 100, "The Spite Store"
Rebecca Romijn	Penelope	Episode 96, "The Surprise Party"

== Season 11 (2021) ==
=== As themselves ===
Guest star	Known for	Episode(s)
Albert Brooks	actor/director	Episode 101, "The Five-Foot Fence"
Lily Collins	actress	Episode 110, "The Mormon Advantage"
Ted Danson	actor	Episode 103, "The Mini-Bar"; Episode 107, "Irma Kostroski"; Episode 108, "What Have I Done?"; Episode 110, "The Mormon Advantage"
Jon Hamm	actor	Episode 101, "The Five-Foot Fence"
Woody Harrelson	actor	Episode 104, "The Watermelon"
Richard Lewis	comedian	Episode 107, "Irma Kostroski"
Lucy Liu	actress	Episode 101, "The Five-Foot Fence"
Dylan O'Brien	actor	Episode 102, "Angel Muffin"
Seth Rogen	actor and comedian	Episode 106, "Man Fights Tiny Woman"
Alexander Vindman	U.S. Army officer and whistleblower	Episode 110, "The Mormon Advantage"

=== In fictional roles ===
Guest star	Role	Episode(s)
Mark McKinney	Dennis Zweibel	Episode 101, "The Five-Foot Fence"
Julie Bowen	Gabby McAfee	Episode 105, "IRASHAIMASSE!"
Kaley Cuoco	Heidi	Episode 104, "The Watermelon"
Josh Gad	Chiropractor	Episode 106, "Man Fights Tiny Woman"
Bill Hader	Igor, Gregor and Timor	Episode 109, "Igor, Gregor & Timor"
Richard Kind	Cousin Andy	Episode 103, "The Mini Bar"
Briana Cuoco	Female Employee #1	Episode 103, "The Mini Bar"
Marc Menchaca	Klansman Joe	Episode 104, "The Watermelon"
Rob Morrow	Hal Berman	Episode 105, "IRASHAIMASSE!"
Patton Oswalt	Harry Baskin	Episode 103, "The Mini Bar"
Jon Rudnitsky	Asa	Episode 107, "Irma Kostroski"
Reid Scott	Don Winslow Jr.	Episode 101, "The Five-foot Fence"; Episode 102, "Angel Muffin"
Tracey Ullman	Irma Kostroski	Episode 107, "Irma Kostroski"; Episode 108, "What Have I Done?"; Episode 109, "Igor, Gregor & Timor"; Episode 110, "The Mormon Advantage"
Vince Vaughn	Freddie Funkhouser	Episode 102, "Angel Muffin"; Episode 103, "The Mini Bar"; Episode 104, "The Watermelon"; Episode 105, "IRASHAIMASSE!"; Episode 106, "Man Fights Tiny Woman"

== Season 12 (2024) ==
=== As themselves ===
Guest star	Known for	Episode(s)
Dan Abrams	journalist	Episode 120, "No Lessons Learned"
Stacey Abrams	politician	Episode 112, "The Lawn Jockey"
Mika Brzezinski	actor	Episode 112, "The Lawn Jockey"
Ted Danson	actor	Episode 113, "Vertical Drop, Horizontal Tug" Episode 115, "Fish Stuck" Episode 116, "The Gettysburg Address" Episode 120, "No Lessons Learned"
Willie Geist	journalist	Episode 112, "The Lawn Jockey" Episode 114, "Disgruntled" Episode 120, "No Lessons Learned"
Savannah Guthrie	journalist	Episode 119, "Ken/Kendra"
Chris Hayes	journalist	Episode 120, "No Lessons Learned"
Jimmy Kimmel	comedian	Episode 111, "Atlanta"
Hoda Kotb	journalist	Episode 119, "Ken/Kendra"
Troy Kotsur	actor	Episode 113, "Vertical Drop, Horizontal Tug"
Lori Laughlin	actress	Episode 116, "The Gettysburg Address"
Richard Lewis	comedian	Episode 113, "Vertical Drop, Horizontal Tug" Episode 115, "Fish Stuck" Episode 117, "The Dream Scheme" Episode 118, "The Colostomy Bag" Episode 120, "No Lessons Learned"
Sienna Miller	actress	Episode 113, "Vertical Drop, Horizontal Tug" Episode 115, "Fish Stuck" Episode 116, "The Gettysburg Address"
Conan O'Brien	comedian	Episode 118, "The Colostomy Bag"
Joe Scarborough	television host	Episode 112, "The Lawn Jockey"
Jerry Seinfeld	comedian	Episode 120, "No Lessons Learned"
Bruce Springsteen	singer	Episode 112, "The Lawn Jockey" Episode 119, "Ken/Kendra" Episode 120, "No Lessons Learned"
Alexander Vindman	U.S. Army officer and whistleblower	Episode 120, "No Lessons Learned"

=== In fictional roles ===
Guest star	Role	Episode(s)
Essence Atkins	Renee Holcomb	Episode 117, "The Dream Scheme"
Iris Bahr	Rachel Heineman	Episode 120, "No Lessons Learned"
Ike Barinholtz	Shimon	Episode 116, "The Gettysburg Address"
Jillian Bell	Maureen	Episode 120, "No Lessons Learned"
Matt Berry	Les McCrabb	Episode 119, "Ken/Kendra"
Steve Buscemi	Mike DiCarlo	Episode 118, "The Colostomy Bag"
Sharlto Copley	Michael Fouchay	Episode 111, "Atlanta" Episode 120, "No Lessons Learned"
Trevor Einhorn	Waylan Grossbard	Episode 117, "The Dream Scheme"
Ellia English	Auntie Rae	Episode 111, "Atlanta" Episode 112, "The Lawn Jockey" Episode 120, "No Lessons Learned"
Arabella Field	Gina Grossbard	Episode 117, "The Dream Scheme"
Patrick Gallo	Stu Grossbard	Episode 117, "The Dream Scheme"
Tania Gunadi	Chunhua	Episode 119, "Ken/Kendra"
Saverio Guerra	Joe D'Angelo	Episode 112, "The Lawn Jockey"
Saverio Guerra	Mocha Joe	Episode 120, "No Lessons Learned"
Ian Harvie	Ken	Episode 119, "Ken/Kendra"
Sean Hayes	Christopher Mantle	Episode 115, "Fish Stuck" Episode 118, "The Colostomy Bag"
Allison Janney	Cynthia	Episode 120, "No Lessons Learned"
Moshe Kasher	Restaurant Manager	Episode 117, "The Dream Scheme"
Greg Kinnear	Earl Mack	Episode 120, "No Lessons Learned"
Sanaa Lathan	Sibby Sanders	Episode 119, "Ken/Kendra" Episode 120, "No Lessons Learned"
Dana Lee	Mr. Takahashi	Episode 113, "Vertical Drop, Horizontal Tug" Episode 114, "Disgruntled" Episode 120, "No Lessons Learned"
Dan Levy	Abe Zeckelman	Episode 115, "Fish Stuck"
Al Madrigal	Lorenzo	Episode 119, "Ken/Kendra"
Keyla Monterroso Mejia	Maria Sofia	Episode 111, "Atlanta"
Brad Morris	Mock Trial Prosecutor	Episode 118, "The Colostomy Bag"
Annie Mumolo	Dr. Melanie Stainback	Episode 114, "Disgruntled"
Dean Norris	Judge Whittaker	Episode 120, "No Lessons Learned"
Drew Powell	Cyrus	Episode 111, "Atlanta" Episode 114, "Disgruntled" Episode 115, "Fish Stuck"
Jon Reep	Emmett	Episode 112, "The Lawn Jockey"
Rob Riggle	Hobie Turner	Episode 114, "Disgruntled"
Kali Rocha	Betty	Episode 111, "Atlanta"
Mitch Rouse	Hotel Manager	Episode 111, "Atlanta"
Tracey Ullman	Irma Kostrowski	Episode 111, "Atlanta" Episode 113, "Vertical Drop, Horizontal Tug" Episode 114, "Disgruntled" Episode 115, "Fish Stuck" Episode 120, "No Lessons Learned"
Vince Vaughn	Freddie Funkhouser	Episode 113, "Vertical Drop, Horizontal Tug" Episode 115, "Fish Stuck" Episode 117, "The Dream Scheme"
Stephanie Styles	Jenna	Episode 115, "The Fish Stuck"

== See also ==
- Curb Your Enthusiasm
- List of Curb Your Enthusiasm recurring roles
- List of Curb Your Enthusiasm episodes
