= Curb Your Enthusiasm season 3 =

Season of American TV comedy series

Curb Your Enthusiasm
- Season 3
- Region 1 home media release cover
- Starring: Larry David; Cheryl Hines; Jeff Garlin
- No. of episodes: 10

Release
- Original network: HBO
- Original release: September 15 – November 17, 2002

Season chronology
- ← Previous; Season 2 Next → Season 4

The third season of the American television comedy series Curb Your Enthusiasm premiered on September 15, 2002, and concluded on November 17, 2002. The ten-episode season was broadcast in the United States on HBO, where its ratings had doubled from the previous season's.

The series stars Larry David as a fictionalized version of himself, following his life as a semi-retired television writer and producer in Los Angeles. The season's narrative mainly revolves around Larry's investment in a restaurant, which is slowly built up throughout the episodes before giving all plots in the season revolving around the restaurant a proper conclusion in the finale. Several short story arcs also take place concurrently, including Larry's work with director Martin Scorsese on a new film, Cheryl and Larry getting into an argument with their friends Susan and Stu, and Larry getting a pubic hair stuck in his throat.

David wrote every episode of the season, which, like the rest of the series, was done by creating an outline, where the majority of dialogue is not scripted, relying on improvisation. The season included many guest stars and introduced Andy and Nat, played by Richard Kind and Shelley Berman, respectively. David wanted Nat to be portrayed by an old comedian, asking people like Shecky Greene to be brought in for auditions. Season three was the first of the series where the cast were given separate trailers when they weren't filming.

Season three of Curb Your Enthusiasm received positive reviews from critics and was nominated for multiple awards, including nine at the 55th Primetime Emmy Awards. Since its release, critics and scholars have analyzed the themes of the season, including how it approaches writing its restaurant storyline.

== Plot and themes ==
The season mainly revolves around the opening of Larry's restaurant, but this is rarely the center of an episode narrative. Instead, the restaurant is seldom mentioned throughout each episode—sometimes not mentioned at all in an episode—building up certain aspects that are given thorough conclusions in the season finale. This allows season three to introduce conflicts to the restaurant, like the hirings and subsequent firings of multiple chefs, and make a more climactic and satisfying finale. Many episodes of the season parody elements of the real world, including Roger Ebert being spoofed through Andy Portico in "The Grand Opening", the September 11 attacks—and subsequent effect on the American subconscious—and race-related issues.

With episodes like "The Special Section", season three was considered much more "tasteless" than its predecessors in its humor. Death remained a constant all throughout, from the death of Chet in the premiere to Larry losing his mother in "The Special Section". Another topic season three covered was religion, particularly in "Mary, Joseph and Larry" and "The Benadryl Brownie". A key theme of the season is Larry's ability to be more enthusiastic towards his life, with IGN writer Peer Schneider feeling that the scenes of him "[keeping his] head held high" even in the most difficult of situations prove his character growth when compared with the previous two seasons, where his cynical attitude often took him over.

== Cast ==
=== Main ===
- Larry David as Larry David, a fictionalized version of himself
- Cheryl Hines as Cheryl David, Larry's wife
- Jeff Garlin as Jeff Greene, Larry's manager

=== Guest stars ===
==== As characters ====
- Susie Essman as Susie Greene, Jeff's wife
- Shelley Berman as Nat David, Larry's father
- Cheri Oteri as Martine
- Tim Kazurinsky as Hugh Melon
- Richard Kind as Andy, Larry's cousin
- Chris Williams as Krazee-Eyez Killa
- Paul Dooley as Cheryl's father
- David Koechner as Joseph
- Alexandra Wilson as Mary
- Kaitlin Olson as Becky, Cheryl's sister
- Paul Sand as Guy Bernier
- Paul Willson as Andy Portico

==== As themselves ====
- Ted Danson as himself
- Richard Lewis as himself
- Lou DiMaggio as himself (uncredited)
- Wanda Sykes as herself
- Joan Rivers as herself
- Alanis Morissette as herself
- Paul Reiser as himself
- Michael York as himself
- Martin Scorsese as himself
- Martin Short as himself

== Episodes ==
| No. overall | No. in season | Title | Directed by | Story by | Original release date | Viewers (millions) |
|---|---|---|---|---|---|---|
| 21 | 1 | "Chet's Shirt" | Robert B. Weide | Larry David | September 15, 2002 | 5.53 |
Larry becomes infatuated with a shirt he sees his dead friend Chet wearing in a photo, and buys several for himself. Larry and his friend Jeff become investors in a new upmarket restaurant with Ted Danson and Michael York. When Ted admires the same shirt Larry likes, Larry gives him one, but Ted discovers a hole, and he begrudgingly takes it back. Ted's granddaughter accidentally hits Larry in the mouth with a stick when swinging at a piñata. The stick breaks his upper front teeth and causes him to bleed onto his shirt. Larry offends his dentist by snubbing his dinner invitation, and in retaliation, he inserts buck teeth caps. Ted asks for the shirt back, leaving Larry with only one, which is stained with makeup by Chet's heartbroken widow when she sees Larry wearing it and cries onto it.
| 22 | 2 | "The Benadryl Brownie" | Larry Charles | Larry David | September 22, 2002 | 4.55 |
The reception on Larry's first call on his new cell phone cuts out, leading to his wife Cheryl not hearing from him that their friend Richard Lewis' new Christian Scientist girlfriend, Deborah, has a nut allergy. The Davids hire the chef of the restaurant, which Larry and Jeff are investing in, to cater their dinner party, and Richard and Deborah attend. Deborah is taken to the hospital after an allergic reaction to the nuts in brownies, which Jeff's wife Susie made, but she refuses medication because of her religious beliefs. Larry puts Benadryl in a batch of brownies made by Cheryl, and he gives them to Deborah, who refuses them after one bite because of their suspicious taste. Larry fires Mike, his electronics expert, because he neglected to consolidate his remotes into one universal remote, and the television is not working. Mike and Cheryl's friend, Wanda, both claim the firing is racially motivated because Mike is black, and Larry is labeled as a racist in public.
| 23 | 3 | "Club Soda and Salt" | Robert B. Weide | Larry David | September 29, 2002 | 3.84 |
After spilling a drink onto the restaurant's carpet, the restaurant manager, Jim, teaches Larry a tip to remove stains by applying club soda and salt to them before they dry. After Chef Randy quits, Larry, Jeff, and Ted go searching for a new chef for the soon-to-be-opened restaurant; Larry becomes tennis partners with Cheryl when he becomes jealous of her current partner, Brad, who he thinks wants to have a sexual relationship with her. Larry and Cheryl's wedding gift for their friends, Ed and Melanie Loeb, is refused because it is over a year late, beginning a feud between the families. After the debacle, Larry and Cheryl have sex, but while moving, he spills a drink onto the bedroom carpet. Despite Cheryl trying to get him back into their bed, he rushes off to show her Jim's secret for removing stains. A household shop worker (Laura Silverman) annoys Larry by following him around her shop while he is browsing. When he happens to be driving behind her, she falsely reports to the police that Larry is stalking her. Her boyfriend confronts Larry in a restaurant, causing him to spill wine on Cheryl's dress. While the boyfriend is throttling him, Larry gawks at Brad using the club soda and salt trick onto the stain, in the process, fondling Cheryl's breasts.
| 24 | 4 | "The Nanny from Hell" | Larry Charles | Larry David | October 6, 2002 | 4.55 |
Jeff and Susie get back together after Jeff finds out that she is pregnant, which he reveals to Larry on the condition that he doesn't tell anyone. Larry inadvertently gets a restaurant investor's nanny (Cheri Oteri)—who used to work at Six Flags Magic Mountain Looney Tunes Lodge, where she heard the Looney Tunes theme repeatedly every day—fired when he convinces her to let him use the investor's private bathroom, which was made off-limits to guests. At Larry's recommendation, Susie employs the nanny, after she is complicated by the nanny with her baby, realizing Jeff told Larry and did not keep it a secret, as she had asked. She decides to let this go, and welcomes the nanny into their house, where she attacks Susie after hearing the Looney Tunes theme, and she pushes Susie off the balcony, but she breaks her fall from 12 sponge cakes that were given to her by Larry. Richard tries to get his claimed original phrase "The ___ from hell" into the book of Bartlett's Familiar Quotations, with the help of Larry, but Larry proves to be a hindrance instead by remarking to the publisher that his four-year-old son has a large penis, ending Larry and the publisher's relationship and ruining Richard's chance at fame.
| 25 | 5 | "The Terrorist Attack" | Robert B. Weide | Larry David | October 13, 2002 | 4.43 |
Larry is caught in the middle of a feud between Paul and Mindy Reiser and Susan and Stu Braudy (Amy Aquino, Don Stark), with the latter being offended after he suggests that the money they make is Stu's money and not Susan's, as Susan is unemployed. Wanda tells Larry and Cheryl that – according to a well-connected acquaintance of hers – there will be a terrorist attack in L.A. during the weekend they will be holding an NRDC benefit with Alanis Morissette. She warns them that they are not supposed to tell anyone to avoid a panic, but Larry tells Mindy in order to smooth over the discord between them. A grateful Mindy tells people about it. Several people who are told about it leave the city for the weekend, but no attack occurs. Those who were told about the attack blame Larry for ruining their weekend plans, those who were not told are angered at Larry for allowing their lives to be in danger, and Wanda is angry with Larry for breaking confidentiality.
| 26 | 6 | "The Special Section" | Bryan Gordon | Larry David | October 20, 2002 | 4.02 |
Larry's mother, Adele, dies, but he does not learn about it until after her funeral because he was busy working in New York City on a mafia movie directed by Martin Scorsese. Larry is upset that he was not told before he returned home, to which his father, Nat (Shelley Berman), reveals that he was told by Adele not to tell Larry, on the grounds that she did not want him bothered. Larry uses her death as an excuse to get out of several situations, telling people "my mom died" when he gets into a debacle with someone. Larry is angered when Adele's remains are put in a "special section" of the cemetery due to her having a tattoo, which prohibits her from being buried on the normal premises. He sneaks into the cemetery at night with Nat, Larry's cousin Andy (Richard Kind), and Jeff to put it right, after bribing a landscaper. Concurrently, Larry lets Richard use his meditation mantra, who finds that it has brought peace into his life. However, Larry requests it back, starting a back and forth between the two that is ended when Larry uses his mother's death to make Richard feel bad, who gives it back.
| 27 | 7 | "The Corpse-Sniffing Dog" | Andy Ackerman | Larry David | October 27, 2002 | 3.82 |
The restaurant's opening is now three days away, and Larry finds a chef (Ian Gomez) at the last moment, hiring him on the basis that he is bald, which Jeff calls Larry out for, but he ultimately doesn't care. At the restaurant, a visitor thinks that there might be a body underneath the floorboards, because the Greenes' certified corpse-sniffing dog Oscar reacts at the site. The opening date is delayed while digging is done, but only a bra is found. Jeff is upset at this and asks Larry for help to convince his daughter, Sammi, to give Oscar away, as Jeff is allergic. While Larry tries to bargain with her, Sammi gets drunk due to unintentionally drinking wine from Larry's glass, which she mistook for grape juice, and agrees to give Oscar away to Larry's friend, Susan Braudy, smoothing over any leftover issues between Larry and the Braudys. Susie is angry with Larry about Sammi being drunk and the dog being taken away, yelling at him to get it back. Larry tries to persuade Susan to give the dog back, but she refuses, so Larry uses a dog whistle to get the dog to run out of the Braudys' house and into his car.
| 28 | 8 | "Krazee-Eyez Killa" | Robert B. Weide | Larry David | November 3, 2002 | 4.59 |
Larry befriends Wanda's fiancé, rapper Krazee-Eyez Killa (Chris Williams), who tells him that he enjoys cunnilingus with Asian women, but, after Larry says that he can no longer do that after he is married, he reveals that he has cheated on her multiple times before. Killa tells Larry to keep it secret, but he reveals it to Cheryl. Wanda finds out that he is cheating on her without being told by Cheryl and finding out by herself, despite Larry's insistence that she must've told her something, and Wanda breaks up with Killa. Meanwhile, Larry searches L.A. for a jacket he urgently needs for the re-shoot of the upcoming Scorsese film. He is told by Cheryl that she threw away the one he previously wore on set, which he needs to get in a short amount of time, so he goes to a store to buy a similar one, but annoys the owner and is thrown out. He borrows one from Killa, but he takes it back because he blames Larry for Wanda breaking up with him, accusing him of telling her, and he storms away from their house. Later, after him and Cheryl have sex, Larry finds that a pube has become lodged in his throat.
| 29 | 9 | "Mary, Joseph and Larry" | David Steinberg | Larry David | November 10, 2002 | 4.81 |
Larry begins having problems with his housekeeper, Dora, who tells his secrets to her friends. Larry tells this to Jeff, who soon after informs Larry that Susie caught him talking to a woman on the phone in the night. He asks Larry to tell Susie that it was him using their line, and the two tell Susie that Larry made the phone call to Dora while he stayed at the Greenes when Susie was away, doing this as they assume Dora already planned to quit, which would make Larry free of any consequences. Dora hears about the lie and thinks it's Cheryl trying to find an excuse to fire her, and she quits. Cheryl tells Susie that Larry and Jeff are lying, and Susie angrily throws Jeff out of the house. Concurrently, Cheryl invites her family home for the holidays, which Larry is unhappy about, and they cause trouble for him, a Jew, when they push their Christian beliefs onto him. Larry eats edible nativity figures, which he assumed were cookies to be consumed, not knowing that the family made them to use in a cookie nativity scene. Trying to make this up, he hires a Christian group to portray the nativity, but Larry begins to make sexual comments towards the woman playing Mary. The man playing Joseph (David Koechner) gets in a fight with Larry for this, and, after choking him slightly, the pube falls out of Larry's throat.
| 30 | 10 | "The Grand Opening" | Robert B. Weide | Larry David | November 17, 2002 | 4.73 |
With the restaurant opening imminent, Larry fires the chef after finding out he wears a toupee. Later, at a dodgeball game, he accidentally breaks the thumbs of Andy Portico (Paul Wilson), a food critic. When he goes to apologize to Andy, Larry receives a recommendation from him to hire a new chef (Paul Sand) for the restaurant, who was recently fired from another restaurant. Larry agrees, and while introducing him to the staff, they find that he has Tourette syndrome, causing him to swear aggressive profanities. Meanwhile, Cheryl and David are trapped in a malfunctioning car wash, forcing Cheryl to run through the car wash to reach the bathroom, as well as cancel her lunch plans with Susie, who has repeatedly canceled on her throughout the year. Susie finds her story preposterous and thinks she canceled as revenge, and she tells Jeff to find out the truth from Larry, who insists they are not lying. On opening day, the chef, in an open kitchen, swears loudly, silencing the room. Remembering his vow from earlier in the day to do something good for another person in his lifetime, Larry, along with the other investors, throw out swears of their own in an expression of solidarity, and the restaurant patrons join in, helping make the opening a success. During this, Susie shows up, sees Cheryl, and curses her out, leaving Cheryl speechless.

== Production ==
Every episode of season three was written by David. Like every other season of the series, season three's episodes were written as outlines, with the majority of dialogue being unscripted and improvised by the cast. However, not every actor was given an outline for the first three seasons, according to Hines. The series was produced with a low budget in mind, and it wasn't until season three that the cast were given separate trailers between filming. During the shooting of the finale's car wash scene, David ran over Hines's foot with his car, which delayed filming of the episode by a bit.

=== Casting ===
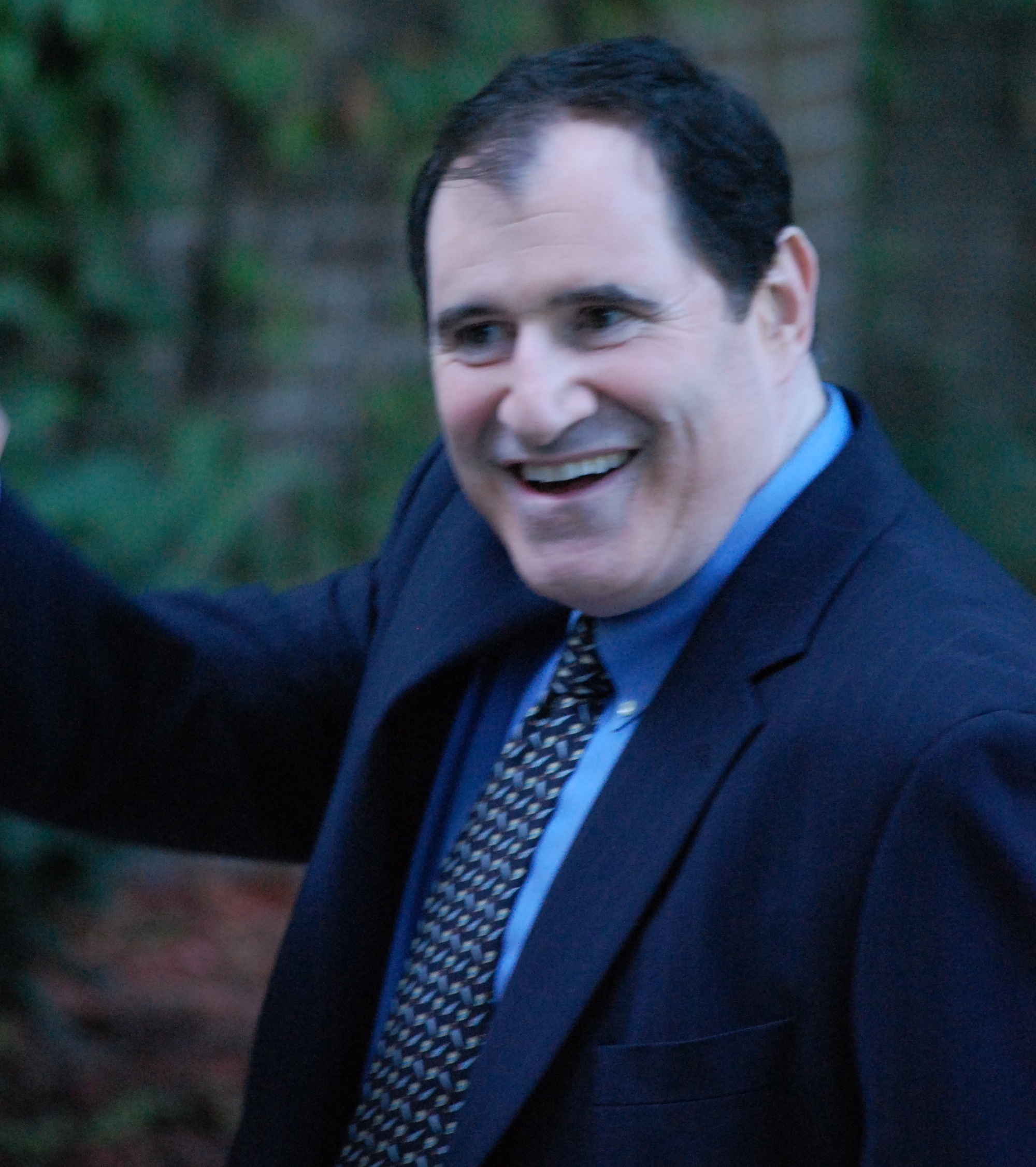
Richard Kind (pictured in 2009) was given the part of cousin Andy for his ability to match David's energy when on camera.

Season three was notable for including multiple guest stars in each episode, such as Chris Williams as Krazee-Eyez Killa, Martin Scorsese as himself in "The Special Section", and Shelley Berman as Larry's father, Nat. When casting Nat, David wanted to use an old comedian, with Shecky Greene being brought in to audition for the role. After Berman finished, David chased him down the hall, asking if he would remove his toupee for filming; Berman agreed and was immediately given the part. Larry's cousin Andy was also added to the main cast, with David creating the character with a stereotypical Jewish man in mind. Richard Kind came in and was chosen for being able to challenge David's energetic style when on camera.

== Release ==
During season three, the series aired on Sunday nights at 10 p.m. EST. The season originally aired from September through November 2002. "The Terrorist Attack" was intended to air in September 2002, a few days after the first anniversary of the September 11 attacks. To pay their respect, HBO decided to air it a month later in October. David called HBO's executive, furious that they played the episodes out of order. He told them not to do it again, which the network obliged to.

=== Home media ===
The third season was released on DVD in region 1 on January 18, 2005; bonus features include a two-part interview between Larry David and other cast members, along with a "Season Index" that includes teasers for every episode.

== Reception ==
=== Ratings ===
Ratings for Curb Your Enthusiasm had doubled during season three, reaching an average of 4.5 million viewers. The New York Times attributed this better performance to the series airing immediately after the immensely successful Sopranos, which averaged 10.8 million viewers, and due to public awareness of the series growing during season three's airing. The highest rated broadcast of the season was the premiere, "Chet's Shirt", which acquired 5.53 million viewers and a 3.5% share among adults between the ages of 18 and 49, meaning that it was seen by 3.5% of all households in that demographic. Meanwhile, the seventh episode, "The Corpse-Sniffing Dog", acquired the lowest viewership, drawing in an audience of only 3.82 million.

=== Reviews ===
On the review aggregator Rotten Tomatoes, the season has an approval rating of 100% based on 10 reviews. The website's consensus reads: "To borrow a phrase, Curb Your Enthusiasm's third season is 'pretty, pretty, pretty good.'" On Metacritic, which uses a weighted average, the season holds a score of 93 out of 100 based on 12 reviews, indicating "universal acclaim".

Will Hersey of Esquire called season three his favorite of Curb Your Enthusiasm, finding it to be before the series became contrived in its writing and when it hit the perfect balance between the early seasons' "lo-fi tone" and creating sympathy for Larry's character. Hersey highlights "Krazee-Eyez Killa" as the standout episode, praising Chris Williams' performance as its titular character. The series became a "cultural touchstone" during season three, according to The New York Times writer Alessandra Stanley, who gave it a positive review. She praised its impious handling of taboo subjects, such as politics, religion, immigrants, and terrorists, applauding its provocative writing. Entertainment Weekly's Bruce Fretts felt Curb Your Enthusiasm was one of the best shows of HBO's 2002 season, preferring it to the "uninspired" fourth season of The Sopranos.

"Krazee-Eyez Killa" received considerable praise from critics for its humor, narrative, and the titular character, and is considered one of the series' best installments. Another episode considered to be a highlight is "The Grand Opening", with Collider writer Amy Elizabeth Marceaux praising it for wrapping up the central storyline of the season in a satisfying way, and for its humor.

=== Awards ===
At the 55th Directors Guild of America Awards, the series received three nominations for Outstanding Directing in a Comedy Series; Larry Charles for "The Nanny from Hell", Bryan Gordon for "The Special Section", and David Steinberg for "Mary, Joseph and Larry". Ultimately, the award went to Gordon. The same episodes, along with Robert B. Weide for "Krazee-Eyez Killa", received nominations at the 55th Primetime Emmy Awards for Outstanding Directing for a Comedy Series, with Weide winning. At the same event, the series received nominations for Outstanding Comedy Series, Outstanding Lead Actor in a Comedy Series, Outstanding Supporting Actress in a Comedy Series, Outstanding Casting for a Comedy Series, and Outstanding Picture Editing for a Single-Camera Comedy Series, with the latter nominations being for Jon Corn and Steven Rasch for "Krazee-Eyez Killa" and "The Corpse-Sniffing Dog", respectively.
