= Chet's Shirt =

- Curb Your Enthusiasm episode
- Larry holds up a picture of Chet, wearing the shirt. The image used in the episode depicts series producer Tim Gibbons.
- Episode no.: Season 3 Episode 1
- Directed by: Robert B. Weide
- Story by: Larry David
- Original air date: September 15, 2002
- Running time: 26 minutes

Guest appearances
- Michael York as himself; Lou DiMaggio as Investor; Ted Danson as himself

Episode chronology
← Previous "The Massage"	Next → "The Benadryl Brownie"
- Curb Your Enthusiasm season 3

"Chet's Shirt" is the third season premiere of the American television comedy series Curb Your Enthusiasm. The twenty-first episode overall, it was written by series creator Larry David, and directed by Robert B. Weide. It originally aired on HBO in the United States on September 15, 2002, to an audience of 5.53 million viewers.

The series stars Larry David as a fictionalized version of himself, following his life as a semi-retired television writer and producer in Los Angeles. In the episode, Larry stockpiles a shirt worn by a widow's late husband, invests in a restaurant so he can pick out waiter uniforms, and tries to avoid befriending his dentist. Larry sells Ted Danson on the same shirt, but this backfires and puts them at odds.

Several references to Seinfeld, a series David co-created, were purposefully placed into the episode, and an episode of the series even influenced how they approached the gifted shirt—the shirt was originally going to be stained with a red dot, but this was changed to a tear after realizing a shirt with a red dot stain was already the plot of a previous Seinfeld episode. "Chet's Shirt" received positive reviews from critics, with Larry being consistently labeled as a highlight, and the use of Chet's titular shirt has been praised by both critics and fashion magazines. It has received analysis from critics and scholars since its broadcast.

== Plot ==
As Larry and his friend Jeff (Jeff Garlin) take a walk, they discuss Ted Danson and Michael York buying a restaurant, interesting Larry. Concurrently, Larry throws garbage into his neighbor's garbage can, and the neighbor threatens him for doing so. Larry and his wife Cheryl (Cheryl Hines) visit Barbara (Caroline Aaron), their friend who recently lost her husband, Chet. As they talk, Larry sees a picture of Chet and notices a shirt he is wearing. Larry inquires about where he bought it, and Barbara gives him the store, where Larry buys it. Larry and Jeff visit the restaurant, Bobo's, and Ted asks Larry and Jeff to dress as The Wizard of Oz characters for his daughter Jill's birthday party. They begrudgingly accept, and Larry also suggests new ideas for Bobo's before agreeing to invest; he also agrees to choose the waiters' uniforms.

Larry speaks to Cheryl, who informs him that his dentist, Dr. Bloure, invited them for dinner at his house. Larry tells her to lie about them leaving town that day. While shopping for waiter uniforms, Larry buys Ted his new shirt as a gift. A man walks up to him and introduces himself as Burt, saying he goes to Dr. Bloure, but Larry tells him that he no longer goes to him. Larry and Jeff show go to a meeting regarding Bobo's, and he gives Ted his gift, who notices a rip in the fabric. Larry apologizes, yet refuses to take it back, upsetting Ted, who gives the shirt back. At Jill's party, Larry finds out his character role has been switched, and he refuses to participate, calling Ted an asshole in front of an offended Jill. While playing piñata, Larry is hit by Jill with a bat, breaking his teeth and staining his shirt with blood.

Larry goes to see Dr. Bloure, who asks why he did not go to dinner, and Larry claims he visited his cousin with Cheryl. Dr. Bloure says he spoke to Burt, and he fixes Larry's teeth, giving him enlarged incisors out of spite. Ted comes to apologize for breaking his teeth, and Larry scolds him for having a piñata at the party. Barbara also comes over, and hugs Larry as she sees him wearing Chet's shirt, crying on it. Ted and Larry wrestle over the newer shirt, ripping it in half. Ted throws it into Larry's neighbor's garbage, and is subsequently chased after.

== Production ==
"Chet's Shirt" was written by series creator Larry David, and directed by Robert B. Weide. Guest stars for the episode include Danson and York as fictionalized versions of themselves, and Lou DiMaggio as an investor. The shirt worn by Chet is also worn by the character of Bobby on The Sopranos, another HBO series. When discussing how the series—including "Chet's Shirt"—goes about choosing outfits in an interview with the fashion magazine W, costume designer Leslie Schilling notes that, because of the series' improvised filming, there are only outlines for each scene, and so they are forced to be "on [their] toes" about how outfits will fit into the narrative. Weide was the inspiration for the scene where Ted and Larry argue over the shirt; Weide was admiring one of David's Tommy Bahama shirts, and he was given one by David for his birthday. However, it was stained, and he assumed David would return it for him, but he did not. They added this to the episode, but changed the red dot to a tear after realizing Seinfeld already had an episode about a stain on a sweater.

The photo of Chet in the shirt is actually of series producer Tim Gibbons. The character of Burt Bondy was named after someone David knew in college. For inspiration for the restaurant storyline, David used his interest in how waiters' uniforms are chosen. He wanted to "be in on the decision-making" aspect of the uniforms, and so incorporated the plot into the season. The episode contains several references to Seinfeld. The name of the restaurant is Bobo's, a name David used for a restaurant in Seinfeld. Chris Barnes, who portrays Burt in the episode, played Richie Appel on the series.

== Analysis ==
Analyzing Larry's character in his book The Palgrave Handbook of Popular Culture as Philosophy, author David Kyle Johnson cites the episode in his case that Larry's personality is vastly different from a normal person's. Where someone with a basic understanding of grief would keep something as minimal as a shirt worn by a deceased person to themselves, Larry repeatedly brings it up to Chet's mourning wife, showing no real sympathy whatsoever. Carina Chocano of Salon credited the show for finding comedy in the incongruous premise of real-life celebrities David, Danson, and York investing in a restaurant together. The episode continues the theme of clothing, one which is often presented throughout the series; Leonard J. Greenspoon found this to be another similarity the episode had with Seinfeld, as episodes of that series would also address clothing trends rather commonly. Debby Wolfinsohn of Entertainment Weekly felt the episode's use of comedic props—such as the shirt—was symbolic of how Larry continually alienates his friends with every decision he makes, inappropriately concerning himself with a piece of clothing and not his friend's dead husband. Critic Austin Smith of New York Post likened the dentist storyline to the Seinfeld episode "The Yada Yada", in which Jerry similarly gets into an argument with his orthodontist.

== Release and reception ==
"Chet's Shirt" first aired on HBO on September 15, 2002. In the United States, the episode was watched by 5.53 million viewers during its original broadcast. It received a 3.5% share among adults between the ages of 18 and 49, meaning that it was seen by 3.5% of all households in that demographic. Overall, it was the second highest-rated broadcast on pay cable that night, behind The Sopranos, but above Six Feet Under. It was first released on home video in the United States on January 18, 2005, in the Complete Third Season DVD box set.

Since airing, the episode has been labeled as a "fan-favorite". In a list from Debby Wolfinsohn and Kevin Jacobsen of Entertainment Weekly listing the series' twenty-eight best episodes, Wolfinsohn included "Chet's Shirt", finding the shirt to be a successful comedic prop, as well as enjoying the sub-plot revolving around Larry and his dentist. Ann Hodges of The Houston Chronicle claimed the episode solidified Curb Your Enthusiasm as better than Seinfeld, in his opinion. Despite saying that "Chet's Shirt"—along with the following episode—were not the funniest of the series, Hodges still felt it was stronger than most programs on during the fall season.

Nathaniel Stein, who went on to write for the series, stated that it was his favorite episode, particularly for showcasing Larry's trait of lying. Austin Smith of the New York Post praised the episode, finding it to be an accurate portrayal of the interactions people have with others in their day-to-day life, and finding its references to Seinfeld to be a highlight.

The titular shirt has received notable attention since the episode's airing. Flood Magazine's Anya Jaremko-Greenwold found the shirt to be one of Larry's best outfits on Curb Your Enthusiasm, noting that Larry "had it coming" regarding his punishment for his behavior throughout the episode. Daisy Jones of GQ placed it in the #1 spot on her list, noting that it "hangs nicely" in its design. Jones also claims that the shirt became a popular purchase following its airing, but was no longer being sold as of the article's publication. MEL writer Miles Klee listed it as Larry's second best attire, likening it to a "business-casual" version of a tuxedo, and calling it perfect for a backyard party.
