= Make Me Laugh =

- Genre: Game show
- Presented by: Robert Q. Lewis; Bobby Van; Ken Ober; Mark Cohen
- Narrated by: Glenn Riggs; Ken Roberts; Bill Berry; Johnny Gilbert; John Harlan; Lou DiMaggio
- Country of origin: United States
- No. of episodes: 13 (1958); 195 (1979–1980)

Production
- Running time: 30 Minutes
- Production companies: Lukehill Productions (1979–1980 version); Paramount Television (1979-1980 version); Dove Four Point Productions (1997 version)

Original release
- Network: ABC
- Release: March 20 – June 12, 1958
- Network: Syndication
- Release: January 15, 1979 – February 29, 1980
- Network: Comedy Central
- Release: June 2, 1997 – February 10, 1998

Make Me Laugh is an American television game show in which contestants watch three stand-up comedians performing their acts, one at a time, earning one dollar for every second that they could make it through without laughing. Each comedian had sixty seconds to try to make the contestant laugh for a maximum of $180.

== The hosts ==
The original version, with Robert Q. Lewis as host, aired for three months in 1958 on ABC. Bobby Van hosted a syndicated revival during 1979–80, and Ken Ober hosted a 1997 revival on Comedy Central, replaced for the second season by Mark Cohen.

== 1958 ABC version ==
Each episode featured four guests. Originally, the first three guests were civilians, while the fourth was a celebrity who played for a home viewer who was chosen by pulling a postcard from a revolving drum. This was later changed to having celebrities playing for home viewers throughout the whole show.

== 1979–80 Syndicated version ==
Bobby Van hosted a new version of Make Me Laugh, seen in broadcast syndication during 1979–80. Contestants were selected from the studio audience; those who didn't laugh received $1 per second or $60 for one minute with each comedian. Contestants who made it through the full three minutes had their $180 winnings doubled to $360. During the final round of each episode, a celebrity guest contestant would play for an audience member who received a prize just for being chosen; another prize was given for each minute the celebrity could survive. Van's version of the program was initially popular with viewers but the show's high ratings slowly dropped over the course of the run and production went on hiatus at the end of 1979. In February 1980, Bobby Van was diagnosed with brain cancer; the final episode was broadcast on February 29, 1980, with Van passing away the following July.

Van's version of Make Me Laugh is especially noteworthy for the early appearances of several then-unknown comedians before going on to greater fame; among them were Tom Hanks, Peter Scolari, Garry Shandling, Bob Saget, Howie Mandel, Richard Belzer, Gallagher, Gary Mule Deer, Yakov Smirnoff, Tom Dreesen, Kip Addotta, Vic Dunlop, Bill Kirchenbauer, Bruce 'Babyman' Baum and Mike Binder. Celebrity contestants who appeared on the program included Frank Zappa, Dr. Joyce Brothers, Jaye P. Morgan, Frankie Avalon, Tiny Tim, Robert Reed, Phil Everly, Bert Convy, Bill Dana, Ron Glass, Dick Wilson, Gordon Jump, Henry Jones, Demond Wilson, Ken Kercheval, Antonio Fargas, Joan Prather, Anne Lockhart, Mary MacGregor, T.G. Sheppard, and Jonelle Allen. The show was written by comedian Marty Cohen, Biff Manard, Howard Itzkowitz, and Michael Smollins, the first three of whom also appeared as comedians.

The theme music for the 1979 version was entitled Laugh, and was performed by Artie Butler and the Big Boffers.

Reruns of this version later aired on the USA Network from October 2, 1984, to September 26, 1986.

== 1997–98 Comedy Central version ==
Like its syndicated predecessor, the Comedy Central version of Make Me Laugh also featured several fledgling comics who went on to successful careers, including Patton Oswalt, Frank Nicotero, Gabriel Iglesias and Heath Hyche.

The game remained the same, but with new additions. There were two formats to this version:

=== Ober's version ===
==== Round One ====
Three contestants competed, one at a time; rules were the same as the original version.

==== Round Two (The Toughest Room in America) ====
Two audience members were chosen for this round, one at a time, each with one of the comedians performing for 60 seconds and trying to elicit a laugh. Contestants made two separate predictions for the outcomes and wagered a portion of their scores; a correct prediction added the amount of the contestant's wager to his/her score, while an incorrect prediction deducted it. The contestant with the highest score at the end of this round won the game and kept his/her winnings, while the other two received joke consolation prizes.

==== Bonus Round (Tag Team Round) ====
All three comics performed at once for 60 seconds in an attempt to elicit a laugh, and could act singly, in pairs, or as a trio as they desired. The winning contestant received an additional $500 for surviving the full time, or $5 per second otherwise.

=== Cohen's version ===
==== Round One ====
Three contestants, who were randomly selected from the studio audience, competed; each one came out one by one in round one, much like the 1970s version.

==== Round Two (Tag Team Round) ====
One audience member was chosen for a 90-second performance by all three comedians, with each taking 30 seconds. The contestants wagered a portion of their scores on their predictions as to whether any of the comedians could make the audience member laugh; a correct prediction added the amount of the wager, while an incorrect prediction deducted it. The highest scorer kept his/her winnings, while the others received real consolation prizes.

==== Bonus Round (Mystery Comic) ====
The winning contestant faced a "Mystery Comic", whose identity was not revealed until it came time for the round to be played. He/she earned $5 per second for not laughing, up to a maximum of $500 for 100 seconds (1 minute 40 seconds).

== 2016 proposal ==
A possible revival was considered for syndication as an entry during the fall 2016 season but was scrapped.

== British version ==
A British version produced by Associated-Rediffusion hosted by Chesney Allen aired on ITV for one series in 1958. In 1983, Tyne Tees produced a revival hosted by Bernie Winters for ITV; this version was notable for having an early appearance by Brian Conley.
