= List of Curb Your Enthusiasm recurring roles =

Curb Your Enthusiasm is an American comedy series starring Seinfeld writer, co-creator, and executive producer Larry David as himself. It is produced and broadcast by HBO. The show features a large cast of recurring characters.

== Frequently recurring characters ==
=== Richard Lewis ===
Richard Lewis (as a fictionalized version of himself, seasons 1–12) is a neurotic stand-up comedian who has recently recovered from alcohol and drug problems. Richard is one of Larry's oldest and closest friends, both having moved from New York City to Los Angeles to pursue careers in comedy. Despite this, his relationship with Larry is often volatile and complicated. Richard frequently becomes the victim of Larry's follies, causing Richard to blame Larry for almost everything wrong in his life. He is usually more sensible and moral than Larry. He has also had numerous very attractive girlfriends over the course of the show, which Larry tends to offend or clash with in some way. Lewis first appeared in the show's first episode (after the pilot), "The Pants Tent".

=== Ted Danson ===
Ted Danson (as a fictionalized version of himself, seasons 1, 3–7, 9–12) is an old friend of Larry's despite the fact that Larry often insults him behind his back. When Cheryl and Larry separate, Ted chooses to side with Cheryl as the two often do charitable work with the NRDC. Danson often appears with his real life wife, Mary Steenburgen, who also plays a fictionalized version of herself. Ted invests in a restaurant with Larry and Jeff in season three, but he ends up leaving the project because he is upset with Larry. Larry and Ted constantly have problems exchanging gifts such as when Larry gives Ted a shirt with a hole in it, something Ted calls "a problem" rather than a gift. In the episode "The Freak Book", Larry gives Ted a book titled Mondo Freaks, which offends Ted and Mary, then crashes Ted's birthday party by bringing his driver in, who gets drunk and harasses Mary. In "The Hot Towel", Larry gives Ted and Mary a $300 gift certificate to a restaurant, but gets offended when he sees them using the gift certificate with Jeff and Susie instead of with him. In "Foisted!", he reveals that he and Mary have separated and are in the midst of getting a divorce (although in real life the two are still married) and later begins a relationship with Cheryl in spite of Larry's disapproval. In season 10, Larry and Cheryl begin a tryst behind Ted's back, but he later learns of the affair and breaks off with Cheryl. Out of spite for Larry, Ted also financially backs Mocha Joe in Larry's feud with the latter. Danson first appeared in the show's second episode, "Ted and Mary".

=== Sammi Greene ===
Sammi Greene (Ashly Holloway, seasons 2–9) is Jeff and Susie's daughter, who is now an adult. Sammi was originally a boy, being only spoken of in the first episode of the series "The Pants Tent". She first appeared in the Season 2 episode "The Doll". In the closing credits, her name is sometimes spelled "Sammy" or "Sammie". She is at times the inadvertent victim of Larry and Jeff's scheme, such as them taking the head off her doll Judy and Larry accidentally getting her drunk when she drinks his wine thinking it to be grape juice. Sammi also shows interest in singing, which Susie takes pride in and often boasts about. When Sammi gave a performance as an anniversary present to Ted Danson and Mary Steenburgen, Larry stops her from singing after becoming annoyed by her singing. In season 9, Sammi becomes engaged to Victor Chesnick (Chet Hanks), an Afghan War veteran whom Larry upsets by refusing to thank him for his service. They marry in the season finale.

=== Nat David ===
Nat David (Shelley Berman, seasons 3–7) is Larry's widowed father. He tends to make mistakes that Larry calls him out on. Nat has glaucoma and occasional hearing loss. He is not very confrontational, but he does have a high sensitivity for their Jewish culture. Nat calls bad drivers "Schmohawks". Nat first appeared in the Season 3 episode, "The Special Section".

=== Marty Funkhouser ===
Martin Norton Funkhouser (Bob Einstein, seasons 4–9) is one of Larry's oldest friends. Despite this, he and Larry tend to disagree and argue over many topics. Funkhouser also frequently claims that Larry is his best friend, which Larry constantly tries to refute. He has a wife (later ex-wife), Nan, and a son, Joey (formerly Jodi), who is transgender and bisexual, as well as a mentally unstable sister named Bam Bam (Catherine O'Hara). Funkhouser also had a nephew named Kenny, an All-American high school baseball pitcher who died after being trampled to death by bulls in Spain. He is often very methodical and by-the-book about most of his actions and puts much emphasis on family first. Despite that, he has been known to take credit for things which may or may not necessarily apply to him. Funkhouser is an avid golfer, golfing at the same country club as Larry and Jeff. Funkhouser first appeared in the fourth-season episode, "The Weatherman". In season 7 he turns up to Seinfeld reunion rehearsals uninvited, much to Larry's dismay, and befriends Jerry Seinfeld. Funkhouser divorces his wife in the season 8 episode, "The Divorce" and returns to the dating scene, adopting a more free-wheeling attitude in the process. After Bob Einstein's death in 2019, Funkhouser is mentioned in season 10 as being away in China; following this, Funkhouser's absence is not addressed again.

=== Freddy Funkhouser ===
Freddy Funkhouser (Vince Vaughn, seasons 10–12) is the half-brother of Marty Funkhouser. First appearing in Insufficient Praise (season 10), he owns a mattress company and is nicknamed 'The Mattress Champ'. He appears regularly as one of Larry's closest friends following Bob Einstein's exit from the show. Some of Freddy's storylines involve helping Larry open his spite store, opening a hotel and receiving suggestions from Larry for the mini bar, dating an optician who he is put off by after Larry catches her littering, getting in a foist battle between Larry for trading responsibilities over becoming a potential foster parent, and dating a Disney store worker using Larry's Groat's Disease scheme to get out of.

== Other recurring characters ==
=== Throughout the series ===
==== Antoinette ====
Antoinette (Antoinette Spolar, seasons 1–4, 6, 8) is Larry's inept assistant who predominantly appeared in the first four seasons. She first appeared in the very first episode, "The Pants Tent".

==== Nan Funkhouser ====
Nan Funkhouser (Ann Ryerson, seasons 4–8) is Marty Funkhouser's wife and the mother of Joey Funkhouser. She first appeared in the Season 4 episode, "The Weatherman". She and Marty get a divorce in the episode, "The Divorce".

==== Joey Funkhouser ====
Joey Funkhouser (Mayim Bialik, seasons 5–6, Chaz Bono, season 10) is the bisexual transgender son of Marty and Nan Funkhouser. He first appeared as Jodi in the Season 5 episode, "The Bowtie". In the Season 9 episode, "Running with the Bulls" Marty announces Jodi is transgender and will go on as Joey. The role was recast to Chaz Bono, who is a trans man.

In "The Spite Store", Larry reunites with Joey, and notices the large penis he received. He later offers a job for Joey at Latte Larry's, but the clumsy Joey inadvertently knock over a custom, self-heating Latte Larry's mug over when closing shop, causing a fire that burns down both Latte Larry's and Mocha Joe's.

==== Dr. Saul Funkhouser ====
Dr. Saul Funkhouser (Saul Rubinek, season 4) is Marty Funkhouser's cousin and Larry's dentist. He first appeared in the Season 4 episode, "The Weatherman". He returns a second time in the episode, "The 5 Wood", where he speaks at his uncle's (Leo Funkhouser's) funeral.

==== Wanda ====
Wanda (Wanda Sykes, seasons 2–5, 7–8) is a friend of Cheryl's who rarely agrees with Larry. In "The Bowtie", (Season 5 Episode 2) Wanda tells Larry that she is "not his link into the black world" after he gets himself in an awkward racial incident. In "Funkhouser's Crazy Sister", Wanda and Cheryl use Larry's name to get a table at a crowded restaurant. She tends to 'appear' anytime Larry has a misunderstanding with a black person.

==== Julia Louis-Dreyfus ====
Julia Louis-Dreyfus (as a fictionalized version of herself, seasons 1–2, 7) is an actress Larry worked with on Seinfeld and Saturday Night Live. They have known each other since 1984. Julia Louis-Dreyfus first appeared in the Season 1 episode, "The Wire". In the episode, Larry and Cheryl have been trying to convince their neighbors, the Weinstocks, to help get an electrical wire removed from their property. In order to sign off on it, the Weinstocks, who are big Seinfeld fans, wanted to meet Julia Louis-Dreyfus. In Season 2, Larry worked on a sitcom with Julia, but the project fell through with ABC, CBS, and HBO. Julia returned in Season 7 to star in a Seinfeld reunion episode. She later accuses Larry of leaving a ring stain on her coffee table at a party.

==== Cheryl's parents ====
Cheryl's parents (Paul Dooley and Julie Payne, seasons 1–5) are the devoutly Christian parents-in-law of Larry, which often leads them to disagreements with him. Cheryl's father is often very loud and likes to sing Christmas carols. They first appeared in the season 1 episode, "Beloved Aunt".

==== Becky ====
Becky (Kaitlin Olson, seasons 1–4, 6, 10) is Cheryl's sister who is often at odds with Larry for religious and personal reasons. Larry privately suggested to Becky's boyfriend in "Beloved Aunt" to break up with her, angering Becky. In "The Baptism", Becky prepares to marry a Jewish man who is in the process of converting to Christianity, however, Larry inadvertently interrupts his baptism (thinking of him to be drowning) and Becky's fiancé changes his mind to remain Jewish, causing the wedding to be called off. In season 6, after Cheryl leaves Larry, she begins to live at Becky's place.

In "Elizabeth, Margaret, and Larry", Cheryl reveals that she and Becky have become estranged over the years, and that Becky plans to sell the house Larry and Cheryl bought for her. Larry attempts to convince Becky to not sell the house, but finds her depressed and dependent on alcohol. After Larry tells Becky she can sell the house, Becky has sex with him and the two began a relationship, much to Cheryl's chagrin. However, when Becky is injured on a ski trip in Colorado, Larry refuses to visit her in Denver without a first-class seat, causing her to break up with him.

==== Norm ====
Norm (Paul Mazursky, seasons 4, 7) first appeared in the Season 4 episode, "Mel's Offer" as an assistant of Mel Brooks who advised against casting Larry as Max Bialystock in The Producers. Throughout the rest of the season, his strong disdain for Larry is evident. Norm was a member of the same country club that Larry, Jeff, Ted Danson, and Funkhouser belong to. In "The 5 Wood", Larry blames Norm when he receives a reprimand by the club for having a messy locker. In "The Black Swan," Norm was the slowest golfer on the course, so others dreaded golfing behind him, until Larry, not knowing Norm had high blood pressure, yells at him and tells him off for his slow golfing. As a result, Norm later dies of a heart attack, and Larry is more or less blamed for his death.

==== Jerry Seinfeld ====
Jerry Seinfeld (as a fictionalized version of himself, seasons 4, 7, 12) co-created the hit sitcom Seinfeld with Larry. Jerry Seinfeld attends the opening night of Larry David's play The Producers, grimacing after Larry failed to remember his lines. Jerry returned in season 7 to star in a Seinfeld reunion episode. Throughout the season, Jerry writes and produces the reunion show with Larry, often spending time with him outside of working on the show. Jerry pushes Larry to hire Meg Ryan for the role of George Costanza's ex-wife Amanda, but Larry wants to hire his own ex-wife Cheryl. Jerry first appeared in the season four finale, "Opening Night".

==== Mary Steenburgen ====
Mary Steenburgen (as a fictionalized version of herself, seasons 1, 6–7, 9) is Ted Danson's wife, who frequently appears alongside her real life husband Ted Danson. She first appeared in the show's second episode, "Ted and Mary". Ted and Mary are good friends with Larry and Cheryl, although she, like her husband, frequently clashes with Larry over certain issues; although to a much smaller degree when compared to Ted. In season 10, Ted and Mary divorce (but not in real life) and Larry attempts to ask the latter out to get even with Ted dating Cheryl. However, Mary turns Larry down, but is later seen by Larry with a man that looks similar to Larry.

==== The Greenes ====
The Greenes (played by Louis Nye and Mina Kolb, seasons 1–3) are Jeff Greene's elderly Jewish parents. Larry is constantly offending the Greenes by accident with careless remarks. They first appeared in the show's very first episode, "The Pants Tent".

==== Jason Alexander ====
Jason Alexander (as a fictionalized version of himself, seasons 2, 7) is the actor who played Larry David's alter ego George Costanza on Seinfeld. In season two, Jason and Larry brainstorm a new sitcom based on the former's experience after the conclusion of Seinfeld: the show is about an actor having difficulty getting work due to typecasting after having starred on a hit show. The project falls apart, however, as the two cannot agree on whose office to hold their meetings at. To Larry's chagrin, Jason constantly denigrates Costanza, describing him as a "schmuck", a "yutz", and an "idiot".

Jason returns in season seven to star in a Seinfeld reunion episode. During the filming of the reunion, Jason begins to get close to Cheryl, who has won the role of George's ex-wife. Larry, jealous and paranoid about their burgeoning relationship, makes changes to the script to keep Jason and Cheryl apart; this causes Jason to leave the show. Larry unsuccessfully attempts to replace Jason as George, arguing that he is capable of portraying the character as it is based on him. Jerry, Julia, and Michael disagree, causing Larry to quit and Jason to return. Jason is the author of Acting without Acting, a short book whose length and title Larry and Jerry mock. Alexander first appeared in the season two episode, "The Car Salesman".

==== Andy David ====
Andy David (Richard Kind, seasons 3–5, 7, 10, 11) is Larry's obnoxious cousin from New York, who later moves to Los Angeles. He first appears in season 3's "The Special Section". Andy has a wife named Cassie and a daughter named Skylar (who is mentioned but never seen). He often joins Larry and Jeff in golf outings when in Los Angeles.

==== Stu and Susan Braudy ====
Stu (Don Stark, seasons 3–4) and Susan Braudy (Amy Aquino, season 3) are friends of Larry and Cheryl. They first appeared in the episode, "The Terrorist Attack". The Braudys and the Davids got an argument after Larry inadvertently ruined their fundraiser event by telling Paul Reiser's wife of a terrorist attack. The two couples later reconcile, but Larry offends Susan when he refuses to thank her for buying dinner. Larry later attempts to woo Susan by giving her Jeff and Susie's dog, Oscar, but later takes the dog back on Susie's orders.

==== Rosie O'Donnell ====
Rosie O'Donnell (as a fictionalized version of herself, seasons 5, 7–8) is an actress who is friends with Larry from their days as stand-up comedians. She first appears in season 5's "The Bowtie", confirming to Larry his reacceptance by the lesbian community. In the Season 7 episode "Denise Handicap", she and Larry got into two fights over picking up the check for meals. In "The Bi-sexual", Rosie and Larry both fight for the affection of a bisexual woman named Jane (Amy Landecker).

==== Doctor Morrison ====
Doctor Morrison (Philip Baker Hall, seasons 4, 7) is a doctor who treats Larry for a cut he got when Mel Brooks hit him in the head with a door in "Mel's Offer". He returned in "The Hot Towel" to treat a hand injury Larry received due to a hot towel on a flight that Larry thought was "put in the microwave". He ended up giving Larry his personal number to ease the communication between the two, but regretted the decision instantly. He first appeared in "Mel's Offer".

==== Dr. Mark ====
Dr. Mark (Rob Huebel, season 5) is a neighbor of the Davids who Larry accuses of stealing his newspaper in "The Seder". In "The Korean Bookie" Mark becomes engaged and invites Cheryl and Larry to their wedding. Larry learns at the reception that Mark performed breast implant surgery for Rachel Heineman, who paid Mark with Larry's money.

==== Dean Weinstock ====
Dean Weinstock (Wayne Federman, seasons 1, 7) was Larry and Cheryl's next-door neighbor with a fixation on Julia Louis-Dreyfus. Weinstock first appeared in "The Wire". Later appeared in "Vehicular Fellatio".

==== Anna ====
Anna (Gina Gershon, seasons 4, 6) is a Hasidic dry cleaner whom Larry frequents. In "The Survivor", Larry arranges to have sex with her at a hotel as a part of his 10th wedding anniversary gift from Cheryl, but an earthquake and the subsequent hotel evacuation caused the affair to be cut short. In "The Anonymous Donor", Larry brings her a semen-stained linen sheet for her to clean.

==== Mr. Takahashi ====
Mr. Takahashi (Dana Lee, seasons 2, 7, 9–12) is the owner of the country club Larry and his friends golf at, he first appears in season 2 episode 1 "The Car Salesman" and then comes back again in season 7's "The Black Swan". Mr. Takahashi imposes strict rules in the club, such as banning cellphone usage in the dining room. He is often at odds with Larry, who accidentally killed Takahashi's beloved black swan during a golf outing.

==== Matt Tessler ====
Matt Tessler (Michael McKean, seasons 6, 8) is a former director on Seinfeld whom Larry dislikes. In "The Bat Mitzvah", Tessler meets with Larry and asks for his recommendation to direct a pilot starring Richard Lewis. Tessler later recommends a doctor for Larry to see regarding a "tickle in his anus". When Larry visits the doctor, he sarcastically tells the nurse (who is Tessler's cousin) that he had a "gerbil up his ass". After an argument with Larry, Tessler begins spreading the rumor that Larry had a gerbil in his rectum, which Larry public refutes at Sammi Greene's bat mitzvah.

In "Vow of Silence", Tessler asks Larry to participate in a charity gig, to which Larry attempts to get out of by claiming he will be in New York. After Tessler finds Larry at his office, Larry once again claims he's going to New York. Tessler then offers his friend's vacant apartment for Larry to stay at, forcing Larry to actually go to New York.

==== Fran Metzgar ====
Fran (Jane Carr, season 2), Julia Louis-Dreyfus's agent.

==== Bridget ====
Bridget (Lauren Graham, season 9) is an NBC censor who dates Larry in season 9. She is a friend of Susie's, who helps to set up a date between her and Larry in "Namaste". She has a son named Eddie, who she claims has Asperger's, which is doubted by Larry. After learning about Bridget talking to others about their sex life, Larry attempts to make her sign a non-disclosure agreement about their relationship, causing her to break up with him.

==== Rachel Heineman ====
Rachel Heineman (Iris Bahr, seasons 5, 9, 12) is an orthodox Jewish lady, who gets stuck on a ski lift with Larry during sundown, at which she is prohibited to be with a man alone. She is forced to jump off of the ski lift, breaking her legs. She gets breast implants later that season. Rachel returns in "Never Wait for Seconds!" when she is interviewed by Morsi, the Muslim man who was investigating Larry's past. She also returns in "No Lessons Learned" to testify against Larry in his trial.

==== Mocha Joe ====
Mocha Joe (Saverio Guerra, seasons 7, 10, 12) runs a coffee stand on the NBC lot as well as delivering coffee to certain offices at the studio. He develops a grudge against Larry when he refuses to tip him for a small favor. Larry attempts to make amends by helping him picking up beans, but arrives after the store closes, causing further tension between him and Mocha Joe. Later, Larry accidentally releases Jason Alexander's dogs who attacks Joe, forcing Larry to pay him off to drop charges against Jason.

In season 10, Mocha Joe had opened up his own coffee shop, which Larry visits with Leon. However, Larry's complaints about wobbly tables, moist scones and lukewarm coffee lead to another argument with Mocha Joe, who bans Larry from the store. In return, Larry rents the storefront next to Mocha Joe's and opens his own coffee shop, Latte Larry's as a "spite store" to get back at Joe. Upon Larry's shop's opening, Mocha Joe begins to lose business. In an attempt to sabotage Larry, Mocha Joe steals screeners from Larry's home and distributes them as pirated DVDs, leading to the FBI detaining and fining Larry. Mocha Joe later falls for Alice, Larry's former assistant who sued him for sexual assault. After both Latte Larry's and Mocha Joe's burns down, Mocha Joe uses the insurance payout and Alice's settlement money to buy the house next to Larry's to get back at him.

==== Irma Kostroski ====
Irma Kostroski (Tracey Ullman, season 11–12) is an irritable City Councilwoman. Larry reluctantly dates her so that she can repeal an ordinance about a five-foot fence law, but finds her completely insufferable.

=== In a story arc ===
==== Season 3 ====
===== Restaurant management and investors =====
In season three, Larry, along with Jeff and Ted Danson, invests in a new restaurant. The management staff of the restaurant, as well as the celebrity investors, grow increasingly upset with Larry. These characters first appeared in the episode, "Chet's Shirt".

- Jim Swenson (Jim Staahl) is the manager of the proposed restaurant.
- Theresa Nakamura (Suzy Nakamura) is the restaurant's assistant manager.
- Michael York (as a fictionalized version of himself) is one of the other celebrity investors.
- Lou DiMaggio (as a fictionalized version of himself) is an investor in the restaurant. He reappears at a dinner at the Greenes' house in season seven.

==== Season 4 ====
===== The Producers – cast and crew =====
- Cady Huffman (as a fictionalized version of herself) is the female star of The Producers with Larry David and David Schwimmer. She plays the role of Ulla. Larry tries to use his 10th anniversary gift (Cheryl letting him sleep with one woman one time, no questions asked) on Cady, but is turned off and repulsed to find out that she is a Republican. She has obsessive compulsive disorder. Cady first appears in the episode, "Mel's Offer".
- Ben Stiller (as a fictionalized version of himself, seasons 4, 6) is originally cast in the role of Leo Bloom, opposite Larry; however, he frustratedly leaves the project because of a series of incidents with Larry, such as him not moving to the front of the car when his wife got out, not singing Happy Birthday at his party two weeks after his actual birthday, and poking him in the eye with a food stick while showing Jeff a new golf move. Ben resurfaces in the season six episode, "The N Word", in which Jeff unsuccessfully tries to hire him as a client. He first appeared in the episode, "Mel's Offer".
- Mel Brooks (as a fictionalized version of himself) is the writer of the musical and the film it was based on. Mel Brooks asks Larry David to star in The Producers on Broadway. In the episode, "Opening Night", it is revealed that Mel Brooks cast Larry David hoping he would fail and that Brooks would never have to run The Producers again. Larry does temporarily forget his lines, only to perform his stand-up act to get the crowd back on his side, and then continues on with the play. He first appears in the episode, "Mel's Offer".
- Michael (Patrick Kerr Seasons 1, 4) is a blind pianist who plays the music for The Producers. Larry and Richard Lewis meet the Michael when they help him move in his first appearance, in the season one episode, "The Bracelet".
- David Schwimmer (as a fictionalized version of himself) replaces Ben Stiller in the role of Leo Bloom. David also gets in a series of arguments with Larry. Larry and David constantly argue over things such as the number of cashews that should be in a mixed bag of cashews and raisins (in "The 5 Wood") and whether or not Larry should replace David's lost watch after Larry finds it and loses it again (in "The Opening Night"); however, the pair end the season on good terms. He first appeared in the episode, "The 5 Wood".
- Christine Taylor (as a fictionalized version of herself) is Ben Stiller's wife. Christine unintentionally causes a huge argument between Ben and Larry when Christine, who had been sitting in the passenger's seat, exits the car and Ben demands Larry come up from the backseat and sit next to him. She first appeared in the episode, "Mel's Offer".

==== Season 5 ====
===== Omar Jones =====
Omar Jones (Mekhi Phifer) is a Muslim private investigator who Larry hires to find out if he is adopted. Jones charges Larry a higher rate than his other clients because he heard that Larry told a group of black people to "keep it down" in "The Bowtie". In the same episode there was a running gag with Larry continually forgetting to give Omar his bathroom key back. In "The End" Omar informs Larry that he is not adopted. He first appeared in the episode, "The Bowtie".

===== Doctor =====
Doctor (James Pickens Jr.) treats Richard Lewis's cousin Louis Lewis after he was shot. In "The Smoking Jacket" the doctor accuses Larry, who is constantly visiting Lewis, of wanting him to die so he won't have to give his kidney to Richard Lewis. Larry admits that this is the reason. He first appeared in "The Smoking Jacket".

==== Seasons 6 ====
===== The Blacks =====
The Blacks (seasons 6–7) are a family of African-American victims of Hurricane Edna, a category 5 hurricane reminiscent of Hurricane Katrina. The Blacks consist of single mother Loretta Black, her children Keysha and Daryl, and their Auntie Rae. In season six, Cheryl convinces Larry to take the Blacks in, and they end up leaving in season seven. The Blacks first appeared in the season six premiere, "Meet the Blacks".

- Loretta Black (Vivica A. Fox) is the family's mother who begins a relationship with Larry in "The Bat Mitzvah" after the two danced during Sammie Greene's Bat Mitzvah. In season 7, she is diagnosed with cancer, and left Larry when she thought she saw Larry getting fellatio in his car from Leon's best friend's wife, who was having an affair with Leon. Larry, wanting to break up with Loretta before, lets her leave without an explanation.
- Keysha and Daryl Black (Carla Jeffrey and Nick Nervies) are Loretta's daughter and son who move in with the Davids in Season 6 and move out the following season. In "The Ida Funkhouser Roadside Memorial" Keysha does not get into a private school because Larry tries to steal back flowers he gave to the head mistress that he stole from Ida's memorial site.
- Auntie Rae (Ellia English) is Loretta's aunt who also moves in with the Davids. In "The Anonymous Donor" Larry dresses up as a ghost while playing with Daryl and Keysha, but Rae tackles him thinking he is a member of the KKK.

Also, Leon Black, played by JB Smoove was also a part of the family during these seasons.

===== Cha Cha =====
Cha Cha (Tia Carrere, season 6) is Richard Lewis' girlfriend. She is often quite friendly to Larry, despite some of his faux pas, including one where he inadvertently admitted he found her sexually attractive. Larry had gotten her a job when his friend needed a receptionist. But he found that her friendliness was sometimes too overbearing, since whenever he passed her desk to use the restroom she would talk to him constantly, and expressed too much concern for his bathroom habits. She first appears in the episode, "Meet the Blacks".

==== Season 7 ====
===== Michael Richards =====
Michael Richards (as a fictionalized version of himself, season 7) is an actor Larry worked with on Seinfeld and Fridays. He appears in season seven to play Cosmo Kramer in the Seinfeld reunion. In "The Table Read", he is tested for Groat's disease and came to Larry for help to cope with it mentally. Larry later enlisted Leon to play a man who has Groat's disease, which initially convinces Michael. But he later discovers the lie, and confronts Leon in a manner that lampoons his 2006 racial incident random passersby take out their cell phones and start filming the event, causing him to look at the camera in frustration. He first appeared in the episode, "The Reunion".

===== Virginia =====
Virginia (Elisabeth Shue, season 7) is an actress and a friend of Cheryl's. She is married to Dennis (John Schneider), an architect. In "Officer Krupke", both Virginia and Cheryl auditions for the role of Amanda in the Seinfeld reunion. While Cheryl's audition was well received by Jerry, Virginia's audition further impressed him and Jerry decides to cast the latter, much to Larry's dismay. Cheryl later reveals to Larry that Dennis had offer her to join the couple for a threesome, which upsets Larry. Virginia later injures her neck in a car accident, forcing her to pull out and giving Cheryl the role. In "Seinfeld", after Cheryl learns of Larry's affection, she quits the reunion and Virginia, who has recovered from her injury, is recast.

==== Season 8 ====
===== Michael J. Fox =====
Michael J. Fox (as a fictionalized version of himself, seasons 8–9) was Larry's upstairs neighbor during his stay in New York. He developed a feud with Larry after the latter begins to suspect that he's using his Parkinson's disease as an excuse to annoy Larry, such as making loud noises with his shoes at night and handing Larry a shaken soda. Fox later attempts to reconcile with Larry by offering him a part in a charity gig, but Larry travels to Paris to get out of it. Fox returns in "Never Wait for Seconds!" when he is interviewed by Morsi, the Muslim man who was investigating Larry's past. He admits to Morsi that he intentionally did some of the things to get back at Larry.

==== Season 9 ====
===== Lin-Manuel Miranda =====
Lin-Manuel Miranda (as a fictionalized version of himself) is asked by Larry to get involved in his musical Fatwa! as it was the condition to have Larry's own fatwa revoked. When Lin meets with Larry and Jeff, he was able to have his creative demands meet thanks in part due to the seating dynamic of their meeting. Before the preview of the show, Lin asks for Larry to have his cousin Valentina and her husband Ernst to stay at his place, to which Larry agrees. However, Valentina and Ernst host a swingers' party during their stay and end up trashing Larry's place. While hosting a paintball game for the musical cast and crew, Larry gets into a heated argument with Lin over the trashing of his place and Lin challenges him to a paintball duel. However, during the duel, Larry's pants fall off and he accidentally shoots Lin in the mouth while pulling up his pants. As a result of the incident, Lin is put out of commission for six months and the musical is called off.

==== Season 10 ====
===== Alice =====
Alice (Megan Ferguson) is Larry's former assistant. In the season 10 premiere "Happy New Year", Larry inadvertently causes Alice to be uncomfortable when he questions a tattoo on her wrist and uses her shirt to wipe his glasses. She later walks into Larry wearing a Make America Great Again hat while mimicking the Donald Trump Access Hollywood tape incident (while mistaking Jeff for Harvey Weinstein) and walks out disgusted. Alice soon meets with a lawyer and accuses Larry of sexual harassment. Larry first attempts to make peace with Alice by meeting at a restaurant with her, but another misunderstanding where Larry side-sits next to Alice and grabs her arm causes her to walk out again. She later agrees to drop the lawsuit if Larry agrees to make a donation and make a speech for Survivors United, an anti-sexual assault nonprofit. However, when Larry avoids a hug from Laverne Cox onstage because of her cold, Alice instead opts for a lawsuit settlement. When Larry runs into Alice at the elevator, he offers her a scone as an apology, but Alice chokes and passes out, causing her to suffer a memory loss in the process, therefore ending the lawsuit. However, in the season 10 finale "The Spite Store", Alice visits Larry's coffee shop and regains her memory upon tasting a scone, and runs out again. Outside, she is saved from a fall by Mocha Joe and the two fall for each other. They later use the lawsuit settlement money and insurance payout to buy the house next to Larry's as a "spite house".

===== Roger Swindell =====
Roger Swindell (Ben Shenkman) is a lawyer Larry hires to represent him when he was sued for sexual harassment.
