= The Nanny from Hell =

- Curb Your Enthusiasm episode
- Larry (left) and Martine (right) show up at Susie's doorstep with sponge cakes. Cheri Oteri's performance as Martine was praised, being hailed as one of the series' best guest stars by critics.
- Episode no.: Season 3 Episode 4
- Directed by: Larry Charles
- Story by: Larry David
- Original air date: October 6, 2002
- Running time: 30 minutes

Guest appearances
- Richard Lewis as himself; Susie Essman as Susie Greene; Cheri Oteri as Martine the nanny; Tim Kazurinsky as Hugh Mellon

Episode chronology
← Previous "Club Soda and Salt"	Next → "The Terrorist Attack"
- Curb Your Enthusiasm season 3

"The Nanny from Hell", also known as "The Nanny", is the fourth episode of the third season of the American television comedy series Curb Your Enthusiasm. The twenty-fourth episode overall, it was written by series creator Larry David and directed by Larry Charles. It originally aired on HBO in the United States on October 6, 2002, to an audience of 4.55 million viewers.

The series stars Larry David as a fictionalized version of himself, following his life in Los Angeles. In the episode, Larry requests fellow restaurant investor Hugh to put his friend Richard Lewis in Bartlett's Quotations for coming up with the phrase, "the [blank] from hell". However, after making an inappropriate comment to Hugh about his son, Larry ruins Richard's chances. Meanwhile, Larry recommends Hugh's recently fired nanny Martine to a pregnant Susie, but the unstable Martine proves trouble to her.

The quote that Richard claims he coined was inspired by the real-life Richard Lewis, who similarly asserted that he came up with the same phrase. Lewis was not aware that David put the quote in the episode, and, upon hearing it when filming the episode, was overjoyed. Michael Aquino, who portrays Hugh's son, did not want to insult David while filming, so he was fed insults by Tim Kazurinsky, which proved to be humorous to both David and Aquino. "The Nanny from Hell" received generally positive reviews from critics, particularly for the performance of Cheri Oteri, who was hailed as a scene stealer. Since airing, the episode has received analysis from both scholars and critics.

== Plot ==
Semiretired television writer Larry David has recently invested in a restaurant. He speaks with fellow investor Hugh (Tim Kazurinsky), who invites him to his pool party. Larry accepts, but requests that Hugh—the head of the reference work Bartlett's Quotations—gives Larry's friend Richard Lewis credit for coining the phrase, "The [blank] from hell", and Hugh accepts. Larry's friend Jeff (Jeff Garlin) tells Larry that he and his wife Susie (Susie Essman) are getting back together on account of her newfound pregnancy. Larry and his wife Cheryl (Cheryl Hines) go to the party, where Jeff enjoys the sponge cake that Larry brought. After hearing that Hugh is making people use a cabana for a bathroom, Larry pushes Hugh's nanny Martine (Cheri Oteri) into letting him use the house's bathroom, which she reluctantly agrees to. Before they leave, Larry comments on the size of Hugh's toddler son's (Michael Aquino) genitalia.

At a diner with Richard, Larry says that he invited Hugh to an upcoming screening of Richard's new comedy special, which Richard insists is fine. Later, Larry thanks Hugh for inviting him to the party, and compliments him on his son's genitalia size; Hugh is offended, and walks off angrily. Martine comes to Larry and Cheryl, revealing that Hugh fired her for the bathroom incident and asking that—since she had no work experience before Hugh, other than working at a Looney Tunes ride for years where she heard the same theme on loop repeatedly—they help her get a new job. Larry agrees to speak with Hugh, as Cheryl points out that Martine seems unstable.

Larry and Martine pick up 12 sponge cakes for Jeff, and go to his house, where Larry recommends Martine to Susie for help with the baby. Despite being upset that Jeff told him about the pregnancy, Susie hires her, before throwing the sponge cakes she doesn't want over the upstairs balcony. Before the screening, Jeff leaves early when he receives a call that Susie was injured, and, during the screening, Larry and Hugh's son throw childish insults at each other, further upsetting Hugh, and ruining Richard's chances of getting credit for the quote. Larry visits Susie, asking what happened, and she tells him that, after Martine heard the Looney Tunes theme play on a television, she snapped, and pushed Susie off of the upstairs balcony. However, Susie's fall was broken by the sponge cakes she threw out.

== Production ==
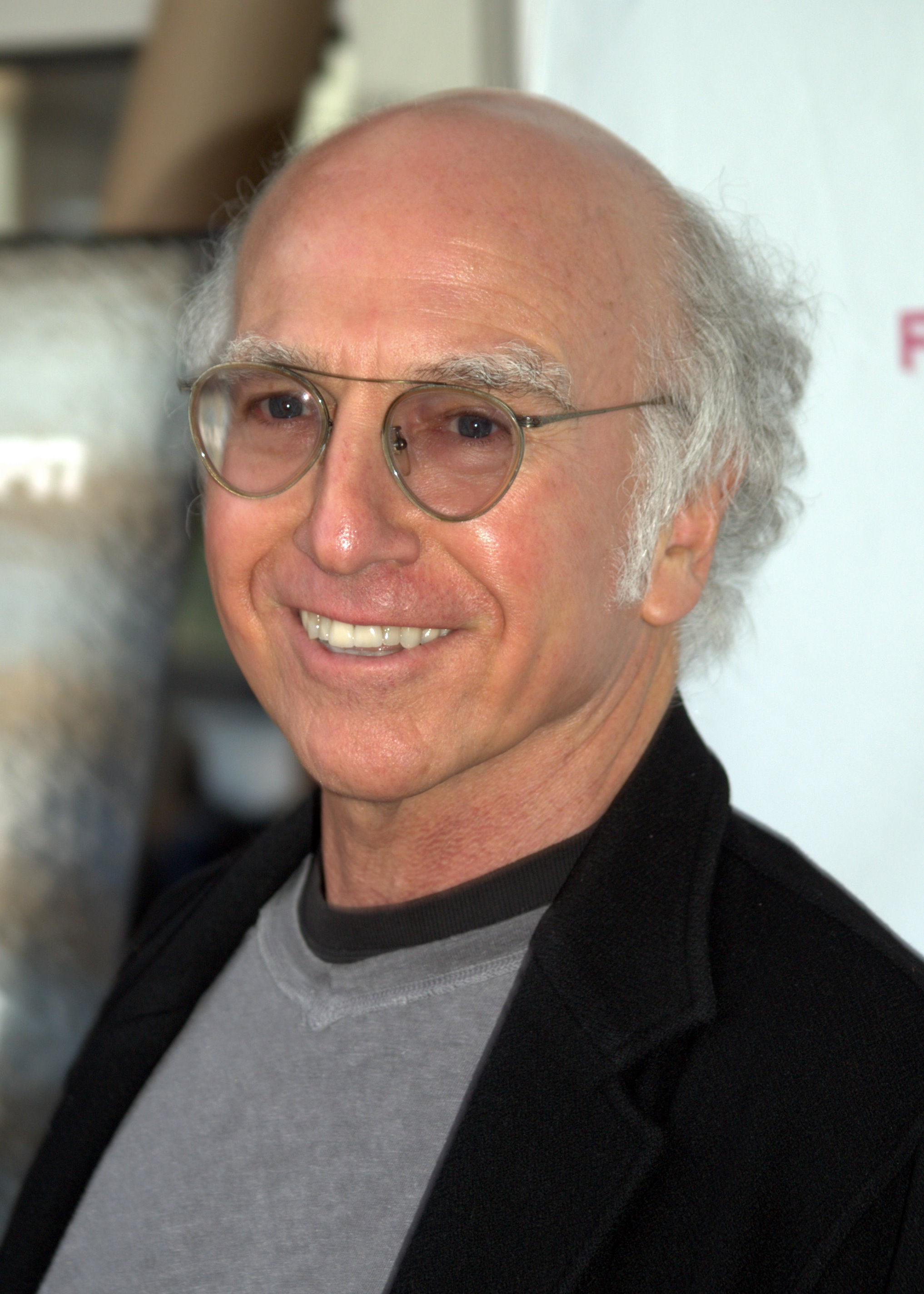
Larry David wrote the episode, and enjoyed filming the scene in the screening room with Michael Aquino.

"The Nanny from Hell" was directed by Larry Charles and written by series creator Larry David, who portrays a fictionalized version of himself as the series' protagonist. The plot of the episode was inspired from the real life Richard Lewis' own claimed coining of the term, "The [blank] from hell". According to both Lewis and the Yale Book of Quotations, he originated the term, and popularized it in the 1970s. However, Bartlett's Familiar Quotations did not give Lewis the credit, and so David, in an act of solidarity, created the episode as a way for Lewis' creation of the term to be "immortalized". However, Lewis didn't know about the episode's use of the term at first, and recalled filming the scene in the diner where a background character says it to them, being happy that David included it.

Cheri Oteri makes a guest appearance in the episode, playing the titular nanny, Martine. Other guest stars include Lewis as himself, Susie Essman as Susie Greene, and Tim Kazurinsky as Hugh Mellon. For the scene in the screening room where Hugh's son, portrayed by Michael Aquino, mocks Larry, Aquino did not want to say "anything mean" to David. To get him to do it, Kazurinsky would "feed him" the lines, purposefully giving him offensive lines he knew would get cut from the final broadcast, such as one where Hugh's son compares Larry's nose to a bratwurst. David enjoyed this exchange, and even Aquino himself liked it. When Cheryl lists the ways that Martine is strange, she mentions that she "takes a bath with her socks on!" An improvised line by Hines, it caused both her and David to break in the middle of filming.

== Analysis ==
Nat Ives of The New York Times felt that the episode served as a parodic commentary of previous legal arguments over copyright infringement on words, phrases, or ideas, such as NBC attempting to stop David Letterman from taking the skit "Stupid Human Tricks", which originated from his show on their network, and put it on the competing CBS. According to author Taine Duncan, "The Nanny from Hell" demonstrates the codependent relationship that Larry and Jeff have, and how it is their "saving grace", asserting that moments like Larry buying Jeff his favorite sponge cake display a sense of selfishness they usually never show; this charming display of friendship between the two, as asserted by Duncan, makes the series, and their chaotic nature, "watchable". The episode continues a trend of the series noticed by critic Charles Bramesco, in which characters will demonstrate their "pettiness [to] jockey for pointless honors", like Richard Lewis' "inexplicable pride" he takes in his quote.

The episode helps the series reshape Larry as a protagonist, as the audience, who is supposed to root for him and be "on [his] side", sees him violating social boundaries to an unprecedented degree by mentioning the size of a child's penis to said child's father, challenging the audience's perception of Larry. Critic Larry Fitzmaurice considered "The Nanny from Hell" to parallel the series' first episode, "The Pants Tent"; the latter was the only other episode of the series at this point to focus a large part of its narrative on male genitalia. Lewis' appearance in the episode exemplifies how willing he is to mock himself and his beliefs for the series, according to Zeke Jarvis for the book Make 'em Laugh!: American Humorists of the 20th and 21st Centuries, who notes this through the episode's mockery of his "the [blank] from hell" claim, a phrase Lewis allegedly also used frequently in his everyday life.

== Release and reception ==
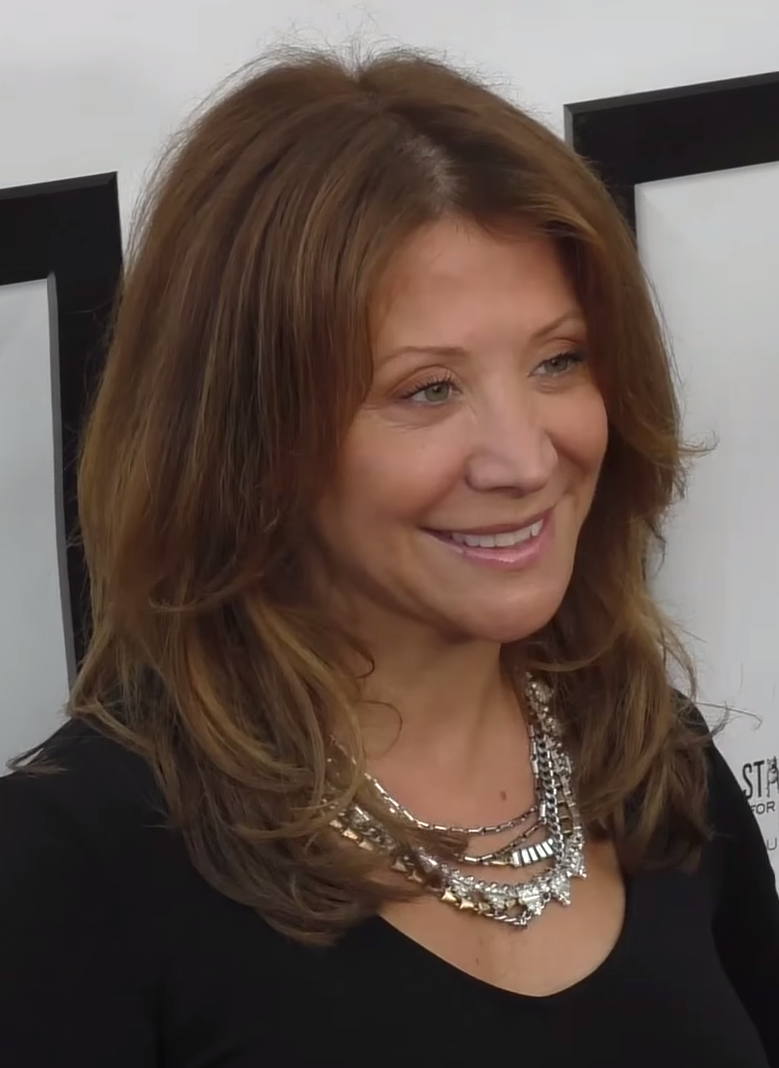
Cheri Oteri's performance as the nanny Martine received considerable acclaim from critics.

"The Nanny from Hell", also known simply as "The Nanny", first aired on HBO on October 6, 2002. In the United States, the episode was watched by 4.55 million viewers during its original broadcast. It received a 2.8% share among adults between the ages of 18 and 49, meaning that it was seen by 2.8% of all households in that demographic. It marked an increase in viewership from the previous episode, "Club Soda and Salt", which had earned a 2.7% rating and drew in 3.84 million viewers. It was first released on home video in the United States on January 18, 2005, in the Complete Third Season DVD box set.

Oteri's guest appearance was hailed as the fourth best of the series by Men's Health, who praised the fact that, despite Saturday Night Live alum being common guest stars on the series, Oteri was able to make a memorable character that obviously was "off", yet able to tie everything about the episode together to make a satisfying conclusion. People writers William Keck and Terry Kelleher, in their review of the third season, highlighted the episode's sponge cake plot and Larry's nickname for Hugh's son being "Porn Baby" as some of the greatest moments of season three. In an article about David and Curb Your Enthusiasm, Virginia Heffernan of The New Yorker wrote highly of the episode, citing it as an example of the "semi-improvised scripts" allowing the series to explore taboo topics like "children with big penises".

Kenny Herzog and Larry Fitzmaurice of Vulture listed it as the 33rd best episode of Curb Your Enthusiasm in their ranking of the entire series, commending Oteri as an "episode-steal[er]". They wrote that "The Nanny from Hell" made for a very quotable episode of the series, despite feeling the sponge cakes, that were only utilized in the concluding moments of the episode, could've been used in a better way. IGN writer Peer Schneider also praised Oteri's performance, noting that it proved she could still play a humorous character when put up against more-experienced comedy actors. Bramesco, another Vulture writer, considered "The Nanny from Hell" to be one of the best Richard Lewis-centered episodes of the series, for the "pettiness" demonstrated multiple times by both Richard and Larry, and their names for each other, including "the English-language police", as Richard calls Larry.

For directing the episode, Larry Charles received a Directors Guild of America Award for Outstanding Directorial Achievement in Comedy Series in 2002 and a Primetime Emmy Award for Outstanding Directing for a Comedy Series in 2003; he would respectively lose to "The Special Section" and "Krazee-Eyez Killa", both other Curb Your Enthusiasm episodes.
