= Mary, Joseph and Larry =

- Curb Your Enthusiasm episode
- Episode no.: Season 3 Episode 9
- Directed by: David Steinberg
- Story by: Larry David
- Original air date: November 10, 2002
- Running time: 31 minutes

Guest appearances
- Paul Dooley as Cheryl's Father; Julie Payne as Cheryl's Mother; David Koechner as Joseph; Alexandra Wilson as Mary; Kaitlin Olson as Becky

Episode chronology
← Previous "Krazee-Eyez Killa"	Next → "The Grand Opening"
- Curb Your Enthusiasm season 3

"Mary, Joseph and Larry" is the ninth and penultimate episode of the third season of the American television comedy series Curb Your Enthusiasm. The twenty-ninth episode overall, it was written by series creator Larry David, and directed by David Steinberg. It originally aired on HBO in the United States on November 10, 2002, to an audience of 4.81 million viewers.

The series stars Larry David as a fictionalized version of himself, following his life as a semi-retired television writer and producer in Los Angeles. In the episode, concerns arise about Larry's tipping when his gossiping housekeeper claims he left an unsatisfactory amount. Meanwhile, Cheryl's religious family stays over for the holidays, but Larry has eaten their nativity scene, and is now forced to help with that whilst worrying about a pubic hair stuck in his throat.

The episode was inspired from a conversation David and Cheryl Hines had via phone call about a Christmas party she was attending. The episode received generally positive reviews from critics, and Steinberg received a nomination at both the 55th Primetime Emmy Awards and the 55th Directors Guild of America Awards for his work directing "Mary, Joseph and Larry". It has received analysis from scholars, mostly for its religious themes and parallels.

== Plot ==
At a doctor's appointment, Larry (Larry David) embarrassingly tells his physician (Jack Gallagher) that he has a pube stuck in his throat; he advises Larry to take liquids to let it pass through. At home, Larry's wife Cheryl (Cheryl Hines) informs him that her parents are coming over and he needs to set up for Christmas. Larry, a Jew, becomes upset at the prospect of them putting up a Christmas tree for her parents, finding it to be offensive to his faith. He goes out and tips his everyone for the holiday, and meets up with his friend Jeff (Jeff Garlin). Jeff asks Larry about him going to the U2 concert the previous night, and finds out his housekeeper Dora has been telling people he went there. Jeff tells him that he made a phone call to a woman early in the morning and his wife Susie (Susie Essman) found out, so he asks Larry to tell her it was him. He does, saying he had called Dora, which Susie doesn't believe. At a party, Larry thinks he may have accidentally tipped his waiter twice, so he goes up and asks, to which he denies, and Larry walks away suspicious.

At home, Larry meets Cheryl's parents and sister, Becky (Kaitlin Olson). Cheryl tells Larry that Dora is upset he's not wearing her gifted scarf, and claims he tipped the gardener more than her. Becky and Cheryl persuade Larry to take Dora to eat. The lunch goes awkwardly, and Larry becomes upset upon seeing the waiter from before say something to Dora in Spanish, assuming it's about him. Jeff and Susie show up, and Susie realizes she might've been wrong about the phone call when she sees Larry with Dora. In the night, Cheryl tells Larry that Dora quit on the grounds that Susie told her Cheryl dislikes her. Then, Cheryl says she called Susie, who informed her of the fib about Larry calling Dora late at night.

The family prepares to go out the following morning, and Cheryl asks Larry where the cookie replica of the nativity scene, to which Larry confesses he ate them all. Cheryl's infuriated family yells at him, and they leave him behind at home. Larry drives around, eventually finding people dressed for a real nativity scene. He asks them to go to his house, and they work out a deal with Larry donating $500 and a meal to the church. After they finish preparing, Larry ogles Mary (Alexandra Wilson), and Joseph (David Koechner) tackles him, choking him; the pube finally leaves Larry's throat, which he loudly proclaims in front of Cheryl's family.

== Production ==
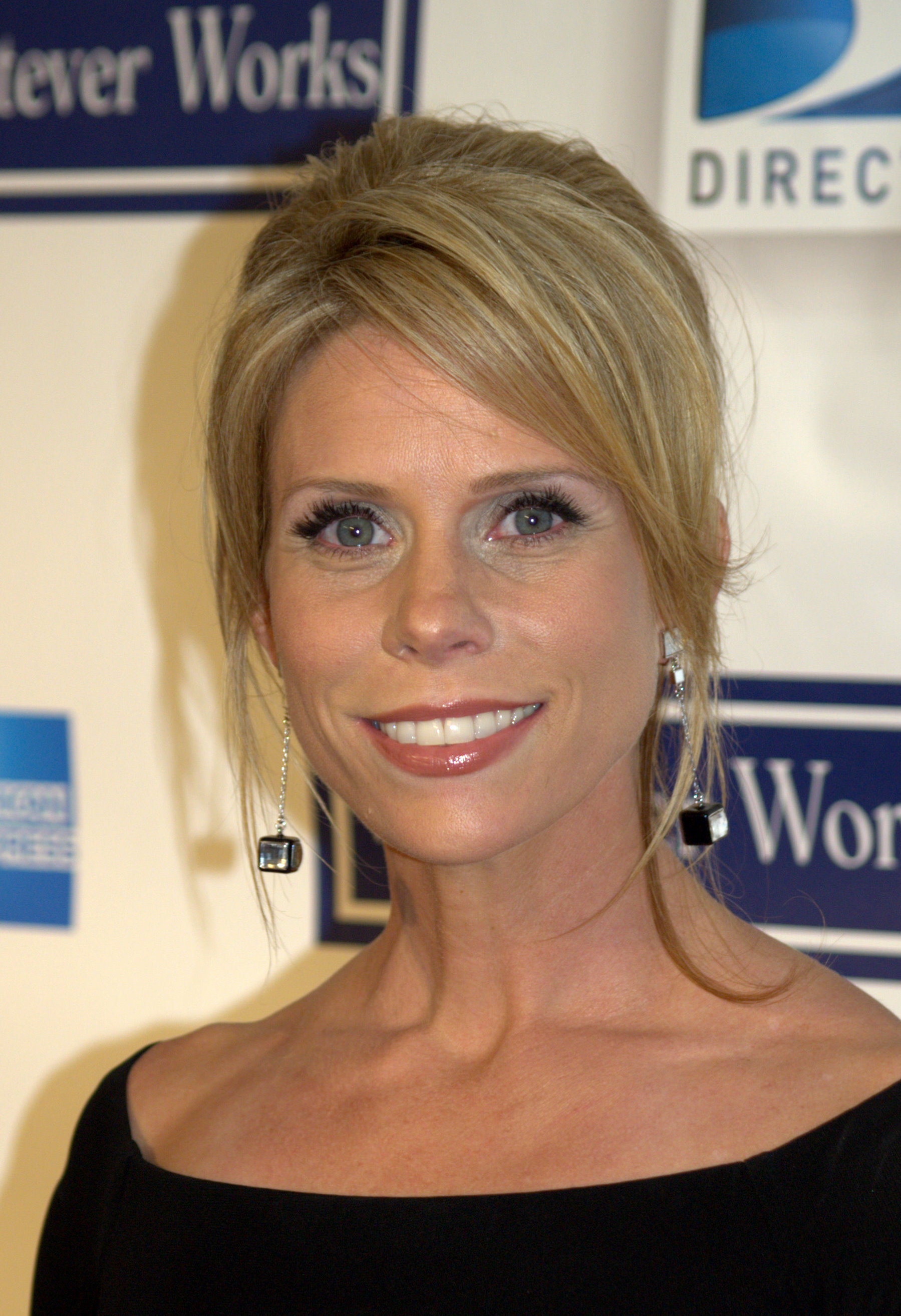
Cheryl Hines (pictured) inspired the episode's plot about the baby Jesus cookie.

"Mary, Joseph and Larry" was written by Larry David and directed by David Steinberg. The eating of the baby Jesus cookie was inspired by a real life incident involving Cheryl Hines. During a Christmas party, Hines saw a nativity scene made out of cookies, and was repeatedly told not to eat the baby Jesus. She called David and remarked that she thought, if he were there, that he would purposely eat the baby Jesus to annoy her family, which he "loved". During this call, Hines also learned that David had never heard of a nativity scene before. The joke where Larry tells Cheryl he's getting her his grandfather's tallis for Christmas was Jeff Garlin's favorite gag from the series at that point; he joked to David that he would "wrestle [him]" if the joke was cut from the final episode. When Larry speaks with the gardener, he asks if he can use the word "tu" while speaking to him, which was taken from one of David's old standup bits.

== Analysis ==
The episode shows how unfortunate Larry's attempts at acceptable social behavior are, using the wrong Spanish words when talking to two different people. Author Jeffrey Nash describes this as an example of the series using cringe comedy to elicit a reaction from the audience. The episode deals with the topic of Jews learning about Christmas traditions, as described by authors Monique Scheer and Pamela Klassen. This is showcased in the scene of Larry finding out about—and subsequently being upset by—Cheryl's placing of a Christmas tree in their home. Author Leonard Jay Greenspoon also found the episode to exhibit themes of Judaism and Christianity's traditions clashing, with Larry worrying that God might think he's given up on his faith simply for indulging Cheryl in her Christmas tree.

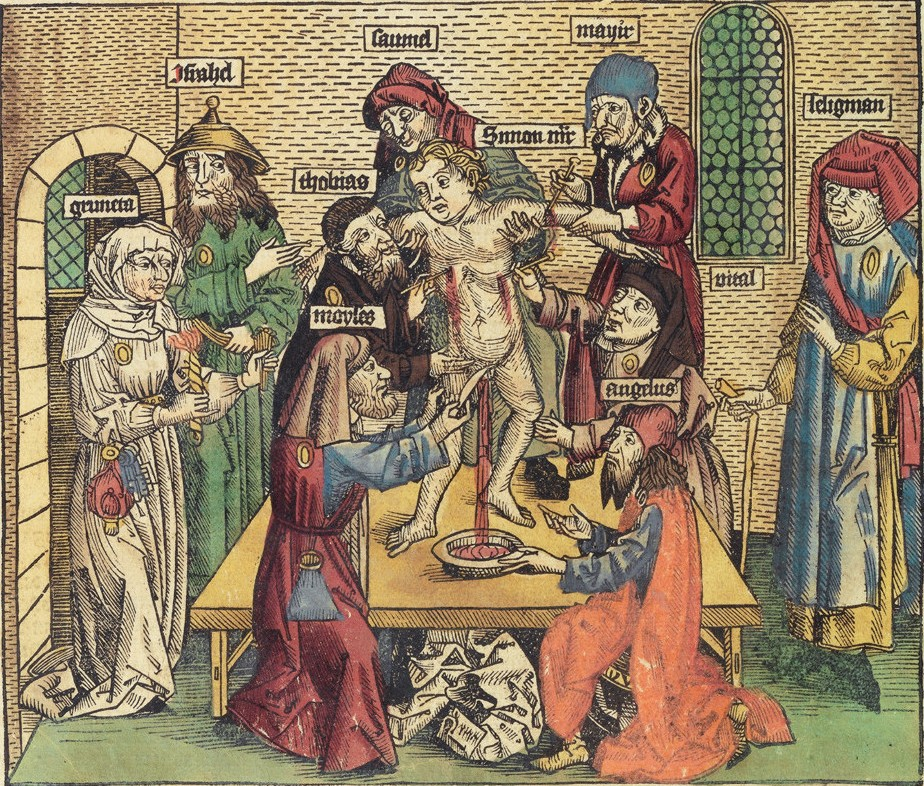
Larry being shamed by Cheryl's family for eating the cookie nativity has been compared to blood libel.

PJ Grisar of The Forward likened Larry's actions in "Mary, Joseph and Larry" to those of the Grinch. Jesse Bering found the episode to be exemplary of how many people are put off by the idea of fellatio because of the fear of getting a pubic hair stuck in one's throat; Bering uses the episode in his study on how media is linked to concerns about sexual health. The episode, as claimed by author Jonathan Karp, parallels medical charges of blood libel and host desecration, as Larry, a Jewish man, eats the cookie version of baby Jesus, and is accused of blasphemy by Cheryl's religious parents and sister.

== Release and reception ==
"Mary, Joseph and Larry" first aired on November 10, 2002 on HBO. In the United States, the episode was watched by 4.81 million viewers during its original broadcast. It received a 3.1% share among adults between the ages of 18 and 49, meaning that it was seen by 3.1% of all households in that demographic. It marked an increase in viewership from the previous episode, "Krazee-Eyez Killa", which had also earned a 3.1% rating, but drew in fewer viewers at 4.59 million. It was first released on home video in the United States on January 18, 2005, in the Complete Third Season DVD box set.

It received positive reviews from critics. Max Nicholson of IGN found the episode similar to "The Bare Midriff", a later episode of Curb Your Enthusiasm which also focused on religion. He ultimately listed it as the seventh best episode of the series. Decider's Kayla Cobb felt the episode would be controversial if aired later in the series' run, particularly for Larry's ogling of Mary's actress. However, Cobb notes that she does think the scene is one of Curb Your Enthusiasm's tamer jokes. Jake Hodges of Collider listed "Mary, Joseph and Larry" as one of the best Christmas-themed television episodes, describing it as one of the funniest episodes of the already great third season; as did Jessica Sager of Parade and Esther Zuckerman of Time. CBS News' Rebecca Leung praised the episode, finding it perfectly representative of David's "cutting-edge" comedy. Cheryl Hines called the episode her favorite in an interview, citing her heavy involvement in its creation as the reason.

At the 55th Directors Guild of America Awards, David Steinberg received a nomination for Outstanding Directing in a Comedy Series, but lost to Bryan Gordon for "The Special Section", another episode of Curb Your Enthusiasm. Steinberg was also nominated for Outstanding Directing for a Comedy Series at the 55th Primetime Emmy Awards. He similarly lost to another Curb Your Enthusiasm episode, this time being "Krazee-Eyez-Killa", directed by Robert B. Weide.
