= Saverio Guerra =

American actor (born 1964)

Saverio Guerra is an American actor, best known for his roles as Bob in the sitcom Becker and Mocha Joe in Curb Your Enthusiasm, along with numerous other roles in films and television series.

== Career ==
Guerra played Sammy Feathers in the crime drama EZ Streets, which originally aired on CBS from 1996 to 1997. He then joined the short-lived sitcom Temporarily Yours, playing Caesar Santos.

He played a recurring role, Willy the Snitch, on Buffy the Vampire Slayer from 1997 to 2000.

He played the obnoxious, sleazy Bob on the sitcom Becker, starring Ted Danson, from 1998 to 2003. Guerra was a recurring cast member during the first two seasons and a main cast member from season three through season five. Prior to the series' fourth season, the supporting cast members, including Guerra, filed a lawsuit against Paramount Television for breach of contract, after they did not receive a promised pay raise. The suit was ultimately settled and the series continued for six seasons. Guerra did not renew his contract for the shortened season 6. Bob's absence is explained by his going on vacation and he is never mentioned again.

He played Commissioner Brooks in Monk in the episode "Mr. Monk Gets Fired".

Guerra played Mocha Joe in season 7 of the HBO series Curb Your Enthusiasm, and reprised the role in season 10 as the season's "primary antagonist". Guerra also appeared in Season 12, Episode 2, "The Lawn Jockey", portraying Larry David's defense attorney, "Joe D'Angelo".

He appeared in an episode of the Netflix comedy She's Gotta Have It as well as the TBS comedy The Detour.

He played Neil DeLuca in the HBO series Show Me a Hero.

Guerra also played Sidney Franklin, a matador and friend of Ernest Hemingway, in the 2012 television biopic Hemingway & Gellhorn, directed by Philip Kaufman.

Other television roles include guest spots on shows like Caroline in the City and recurring parts on Weeds, and most recently Hightown and The Last O.G.

In addition to his television work, Guerra has appeared in several films including Mr. Wonderful (1993), Bad Boys (1995), Sleepers (1996), Blue Streak (1999), Summer of Sam (1999), and Lucky You.

== Personal life ==
He wrote a one-man show called Adoption about his family. He is the godfather of actress Shawnee Smith's son Jackson. He spent many years on the New York theater scene. Guerra grew up in a loving and loud family. It wasn't until he was faced with a life-threatening car accident that he decided to pursue his dream of becoming an actor.

== Filmography ==
=== Film ===
Year	Title	Role	Notes	Ref.
1989	True Love	Frankie		
1992	For Love or Money	Carmen		
1993	Mr. Wonderful	Paul		
1995	Bad Boys	Chet the Doorman		
1995	Favorite Deadly Sins	Eddie	TV movie	
1996	Sleepers	Man #1		
1996	The Winner	Paulie		
1996	Breathing Room	Tony		
1998	Carson's Vertical Suburbia	Benny	TV movie	
1999	Summer of Sam	Woodstock		
1999	Blue Streak	Benny		
2001	Sam the Man	Lorenzo Pugano		
2004	Shark Tale	Pontrelli (voice)		
2007	Lucky You	Lester		
2008	Yonkers Joe	Bam		
2012	Hemingway & Gellhorn	Sidney Franklin	TV movie	

=== Television ===
Year	Title	Role	Notes	Ref.
1994	Late Show with David Letterman	Guy Harassed by Cop on the Edge	1 episode	
1996	Homicide: Life on the Street	Deano Hoover	1 episode	
1996-1997	EZ Streets	Sammy Feathers	5 episodes	
1996	Public Morals	John Biondi	1 episode	
1997	Temporarily Yours	Caesar Santos	6 episodes	
1997	Union Square	Artie	1 episode	
1997–2000	Buffy the Vampire Slayer	Willy the Snitch	5 episodes	
1998	Caroline in the City	Adamo	1 episode	
1998–2003	Becker	Bob	90 episodes	
1999	Mad About You	Bellhop	1 episode	
2004	Monk	Commissioner Brooks	1 episode	
2004	Complete Savages	Quincy	1 episode	
2005	NYPD Blue	Lenny Russo	1 episode	
2006	Las Vegas	Dwight Stiles	1 episode	
2008	My Name is Earl	Referee	1 episode	
2009–2024	Curb Your Enthusiasm	Mocha Joe (7 episodes) / Joe D'Angelo (1 episode)	8 episodes	
2012	Weeds	Jeff	2 episodes	
2015	Show Me a Hero	Neil DeLuca	4 episodes	
2017	The Detour	Paddy Greenberg	2 episodes	
2017	She's Gotta Have It	Dog #5	1 episode	
2020	Hightown	Bill Hunniker	1 episode	
2020	The Last O.G.	Mr. Kelly	2 episodes	
2021	Law & Order: SVU	Paulie Banducci	2 episodes	
2022	Billions	Duilio Santuli	1 episode	
