= Lou DiMaggio =

American actor and writer

Lou DiMaggio (born April 5, 1958) is an American actor, writer, and former stand-up comedian, originally from Long Island, New York. Beginning his career as a performer at Catch a Rising Star in New York City, he later relocated to Los Angeles, where he has worked as a writer. He is the father of actor Daniel DiMaggio.

== Filmography ==
=== Acting ===
==== Film ====
Year	Title	Role	Notes
1988	Working Girl	Tess's Birthday Party Friend	
1992	Out on a Limb	Analyst	
1996	The Rich Man's Wife	Party Guest	
1997	Vegas Vacation	Casino Host	
2005	Duck	City Worker #4	
2010	I Am Comic	—N/a	Documentary
2012	Janeane from Des Moines	Tea Party Speaker #1	

==== Television ====
Year	Title	Role	Notes
1990	Baywatch	Jay	Episode: "Snake Eyes"
1990–1995	Dream On	Vernon Pactor	5 episodes
1991	Herman's Head	Waiter	Episode: "Isn't It Romantic?"
1991–1995	Beverly Hills, 90210	Jack / Blaze Reporter / Tree Salesman	3 episodes
1992	L.A. Law	Hotel Desk Clerk	Episode: "I'm Ready for My Closeup, Mr. Markowitz"
1992	Carol Leifer: Gaudy, Bawdy & Blue	The Squid	Television film
1995	Seinfeld	Stagehand	Episode: "The Understudy"
1996	Life's Work	Guy at the Bar	Episode: "Pilot"
2002–2009	Curb Your Enthusiasm	Investor / Lou DiMaggio	5 episodes
2010	Desperate Housewives	Emcee	Episode: "You Gotta Get a Gimmick"
2010	Men of a Certain Age	Patrick	2 episodes
2010	The New Adventures of Old Christine	Security Person	Episode: "Up in the Airport"
2012	2 Broke Girls	Detective James	Episode: "And the Upstairs Neighbor"
2016	NCIS	Nestor Carbone	Episode: "Philly"
2016	On the Bright Side	Police Officer	Television film
2017	Where the Bears Are	Toby Marsden	3 episodes
2020	Breakroom USA	Lou	3 episodes

=== Writing ===
Year	Title	Notes
1997	Win Ben Stein's Money	2 episodes
1997	Make Me Laugh	Episode: "Juli, Mark, Jenny"
1998	You're On!	4 episodes
1999	The Big Moment	Episode dated 26 June 1999
2002	Weakest Link	Episode #1.12
2003–2004	Who Wants to Marry My Dad?	11 episodes
2007	The Singing Bee	6 episodes
2007–2008	Are You Smarter than a 5th Grader?	18 episodes
2008	The Moment of Truth	17 episodes
2013	The Million Second Quiz	10 episodes
2019	Common Knowledge	10 episodes
