= List of people from Glendale, California =

Glendale, California
- Location within California Location within the United States
- Coordinates: 34°08′46″N 118°15′18″W
- Country: United States
- State: California
- County: Los Angeles

Glendale is a city located primarily in the Verdugo Mountains region, with a small portion in the San Fernando Valley, of Los Angeles County, California, United States. It is located about 10 miles (16 km) north of downtown Los Angeles. As of 2025, Glendale had a Census-estimated population of 187,823 making it the 4th-most populous city in Los Angeles County and the 24th-most populous city in California.

Glendale—along with neighboring Burbank and nearby Hollywood—has served as a major production center for the American film industry. Actor John Wayne was raised in Glendale, eventually moving out upon his first marriage; Wayne appeared in over 170 movies in his 50-plus year career. Other actors include Eva Mendes (2 Fast 2 Furious), longtime resident Clarence Nash (voice of Donald Duck), John Cho (Harold and Kumar films), director Ron Underwood (Tremors, City Slickers), and Bette Davis, who lived in Glendale during her short marriage to Arthur Farnsworth.

Athletes from Glendale include baseball's Bob Dillinger (all star 1949; stolen base leader), third baseman, and Babe Herman, right fielder; both men lived long lives in Glendale. Glendale's Sutherland family were all involved in baseball : father Ralph played in the minor leagues, his son Darrell pitched for 3 years in the major leagues, while Gary played 13 seasons as an infielder. Other baseball players include Brandon McCarthy (World series participant, 2017) and Greg Zaun (World Series winner, 1997). Track and field star Frank Wykoff grew up in Glendale, and won 3 Olympic gold medals in relays. Football notables include coach Jim E. Mora (New Orleans Saints), and Duane Bickett (linebacker), who was rookie of the year in 1985.

Glendale has had more than its share of notable musicians, including Chet Baker, jazz trumpeter; Elvin Bishop (Fooled Around and Fell in Love), Bob Siebenberg (drummer of Supertramp), Scott Gorham (guitarist, Thin Lizzy and Black Star Riders), Captain Beefheart, known for avant-rock; Chris Holmes, lead guitarist for W.A.S.P.; Ed King, member of The Strawberry Alarm Clock and Lynyrd Skynyrd; Greg K. of The Offspring, Daron Malakian (System of a Down), Tanya Falan Welk (The Lawrence Welk Show).

Other notable people include Daryl Gates, former Los Angeles Police Chief; and Angelo Buono, one-half of the Hillside Strangler murderers. Comedian/musician Tim Heidecker did an album named In Glendale.

== Athletes ==
Name	Image	Birth	Death	Known for	Association	Reference
Lee Balkin		June 7, 1961		high jumper	attended Glendale High School	
Christian Bergman		May 4, 1988		baseball pitcher	born in Glendale	
Duane Bickett		December 1, 1962		football, linebacker	attended Glendale High School	
Jenny Dalton		March 5, 1974		softball player, manager	attended Glendale High School	
Bob Dillinger		September 17, 1918	November 7, 2009	baseball, third baseman	born and raised in Glendale, lived there through his baseball years	
Pat Flaherty		January 6, 1926	April 9, 2002	Indianapolis 500 winner	born in Glendale	
Babe Herman		June 26, 1903	November 27, 1987	baseball, right fielder	near-lifetime resident of Glendale	
Hardcore Holly		January 29, 1963		professional wrestler	born in Glendale	
Mike Lieberthal		January 18, 1972		baseball, catcher	born in Glendale	
Brandon McCarthy		July 7, 1983		baseball, pitcher	born and raised in Glendale	
Don Milan		January 12, 1949		football, quarterback	born in Glendale	
Jim E. Mora		May 24, 1935		football coach	born in Glendale	
Vanes Martirosyan		May 1, 1986		boxer	born in Glendale	
Rex Mays		March 10, 1913	November 6, 1949	champion race driver	lived in Glendale	
Al Pollard		September 7, 1928	March 3, 2002	football, fullback and halfback	born in Glendale	
Scott Radinsky		March 3, 1968		baseball, pitcher	born in Glendale	
Archie Reynolds		January 3, 1946		baseball, pitcher	born in Glendale	
Dwight Stones		December 6, 1953		high jump, television commentator	attended Glendale High School	
Darrell Sutherland		November 14, 1941		baseball, pitcher	born and raised in Glendale	
Gary Sutherland		September 27, 1944	December 16, 2024	baseball, infielder	born and raised in Glendale	
Diana Taurasi		June 11, 1982		basketball player	born in Glendale	
Michael Tonkin		November 19, 1989		baseball, pitcher	born in Glendale	
Frank Wykoff		October 29, 1909	January 1, 1980	Olympic gold medal winner 3x	attended Glendale High School	
Greg Zaun		April 14, 1971		baseball, catcher, sports analyst	born in Glendale	

== Entertainment industry ==
Name	Image	Birth	Death	Known for	Association	Reference
Dennis Muren		November 1, 1946		special effects artist	born in Glendale	
James Rallison		May 14, 1996		YouTuber known as TheOdd1sOut	lives in Glendale	

== Actors, actresses and directors ==
Name	Image	Birth	Death	Known for	Association	Reference
Zoe Barnett		1883	December 19, 1969	actress, musical comedies	born and raised in Glendale	
Kimberly Beck		January, 1956		actress, model, singer	lived in Glendale as a young girl	
Migdia Chinea Varela		August 5, 1947		screenwriter, director	lives in Glendale	
John Cho		June 16, 1972		actor	attended Hoover High School	
Claudia Christian		August 10, 1965		actress	born in Glendale	
Bette Davis		April 5, 1908	October 6, 1989	actress	lived in Glendale	
Emilio Delgado		May 8, 1940	March 10, 2022	actor, Luis, Sesame Street	attended Glendale High School	
Erika Eleniak		September 29, 1969		actress, model	born in Glendale	
Robert Englund		June 6, 1947		actor, director	born in Glendale	
Edward Furlong		August 2, 1977		actor	born in Glendale	
Beverly Garland		October 17, 1926	December 5, 2008	actress	grew up in Glendale	
John Holmes		August 8, 1944	March 13, 1988	pornographic actor	lived in Glendale	
Kathy Ireland		March 20, 1963		model, actress	born in Glendale	
Maren Jensen		September 23, 1956		model, actress	graduate of Hoover High School	
Margaret Kerry		May 11, 1929		actress, producer, director - Tinkerbell inspiration	lived in Glendale	
Yvonne Lime		April 7, 1935		actress, philanthropist	graduate of Glendale High School	
Eric Lloyd		May 19, 1986		actor	born in Glendale	
Doug McClure		May 11, 1935	February 5, 1995	actor	born in Glendale	
Katherine MacGregor		January 12, 1925	November 13, 2018	actress	born in Glendale	
Eva Mendes		March 5, 1974		actress	graduate of Hoover High School	
Terry Moore		January 7, 1929		actress	born in Glendale	
Clarence Nash		December 7, 1904	February 20, 1985	voice of Donald Duck	lived in Glendale	
Taylor Negron		August 1, 1957	January 10, 2015	actor, comedian	born in Glendale	
Ken Osmond		June 7, 1943	May 18, 2020	actor, police officer	born and raised in Glendale	
Kelly Packard		January 29, 1975		actress	born in Glendale	
Patti Paniccia		September 19, 1952		journalist, surfer	born in Glendale	
Paul Petersen		September 23, 1945		actor, writer	born in Glendale	
Cindy Robbins		January 5, 1937		actress, producer, writer	attended Glendale High School	
Allisyn Snyder		April 25, 1996		actress	born in Glendale	
Mary Kay Stearns		October 27, 1925	November 17, 2018	actress	born in Glendale	
Gloria Talbott		February 7, 1931	September 19, 2000	actress	lifelong resident of Glendale	
Ron Underwood		November 6, 1953		director	born and raised in Glendale	
Paul Walker		September 12, 1973	November 30, 2013	actor	born in Glendale	
John Wayne		May 26, 1907	June 11, 1979	actor	grew up in Glendale, graduated from Glendale High School	

== Musicians ==
Name	Image	Birth	Death	Known for	Association	Reference
Chet Baker		December 23, 1929	May 13, 1988	jazz musician	lived in Glendale	
Captain Beefheart		January 15, 1941	December 17, 2010	musician	born, lived until 13 in Glendale	
Elvin Bishop		October 21, 1942		singer, guitarist	born, lived until 10 in Glendale	
Armen Chakmakian		February 11, 1966		musician, composer	lives in Glendale	
Scott Gorham		March 17, 1951		lead guitarist, Thin Lizzy	born, lived in Glendale	
Tim Heidecker		February 3, 1976		musician, comedian, In Glendale	Lives in Glendale	
Chris Holmes		June 23, 1958		lead guitarist, W.A.S.P.	born in Glendale	
Ashlyne Huff		August 28, 1985		singer	born in Glendale	
Nicole Jung		October 7, 1991		singer	born, lived in, Glendale	
Ed King		September 14, 1949	August 22, 2018	guitarist, Strawberry Alarm Clock, Lynyrd Skynyrd	born and raised in Glendale	
Greg K.		January 20, 1965		bassist, The Offspring	born in Glendale	
Daron Malakian		July 18, 1975		lead guitarist, System of a Down	raised, lives in Glendale. Attended Glendale High School	
80px		January 28, 1962		singer, songwriter	born in Glendale	
Ronnie Radke		December 15, 1983		vocalist, Falling In Reverse	lives in Glendale	
Bob Siebenberg		October 31, 1949		drummer of Supertramp	born and raised in Glendale	
Tanya Falan Welk		May 4, 1948		singer	born and raised in Glendale	
Lorin Whitney		September 11, 1914	August 29, 2007	organist, recording artist	lived in Glendale	
Dale Wood		February 13, 1934	April 13, 2003	organist and composer	born in Glendale	

== Writers and screenwriters ==
Name	Image	Birth	Death	Known for	Association	Reference
David Brin		October 6, 1950		author	born in Glendale	
Donald Prothero		February 21, 1954		author, paleontologist	lives in Glendale	
Maureen Kennedy Salaman		April 4, 1936	August 17, 2006	author, proponent of alternative medicine	born in Glendale	
Steven L. Sears		December 23, 1957		writer, film and television	lives in Glendale	
T. Sean Shannon				SNL comedy writer	lives in Glendale	
Stirling Silliphant		January 16, 1918	April 26, 1996	screenwriter, producer	graduate, Hoover High School, longtime resident	
Joseph Stroud		1943		poet and educator	born in Glendale	

== Military and police ==
Name	Image	Birth	Death	Known for	Association	Reference
Daryl Gates		August 30, 1926	April 16, 2010	LAPD Police Chief	born, raised in Glendale	
Thomas B. Hayward		May 3, 1924	March 3, 2022	United States admiral	born in Glendale	
Frederick Emil Resche		April 1, 1866	September 3, 1946	brigadier general, US army	retired to Glendale	

== Politics ==
Name	Image	Birth	Death	Known for	Association	Reference
Laura Friedman		December 3, 1966		former mayor of Glendale	former mayor of Glendale	
Peter D. Hannaford		September 21, 1932	September 5, 2015	political consultant to Ronald Reagan	Born in Glendale	
Rafi Manoukian		1961		elected council member and treasurer, City of Glendale	elected council member and treasurer, City of Glendale	

== Uncategorized ==
Name	Image	Birth	Death	Known for	Association	Reference
Tatev Abrahamyan		January 13, 1988		chess player	lives in Glendale	
Leslie Coombs Brand		May 12, 1859	April 10, 1925	Property developer	Developed significant parts of Glendale in the 1900s, built and lived in the estate that is now contained by Brand Park	
Angelo Buono		October 5, 1934	September 21, 2002	serial killer	lived in Glendale	
Caryl Chessman		May 27, 1921	May 2, 1960	criminal	raised in Glendale	
Doug Dohring		1957	September 14, 2023	CEO of Neopets	lived in Glendale	
Bob Lewis		May 12, 1924	February 17, 2006	thoroughbred owner	raised in Glendale	
