= Office Hours Live with Tim Heidecker =

American comedy podcast

Office Hours Live hosts DJ Douggpound (Doug Lussenhop), Tim Heidecker and Vic Berger with special guest Carmen Christopher and producer Matt Carlin in June, 2026

Office Hours Live with Tim Heidecker is an absurdist pop culture comedy podcast with call-in and musical elements hosted by comedian Tim Heidecker and his cohosts Vic Berger & Doug Lussenhop (known professionally as DJ Douggpound).

== History and content ==
The show began in 2016, on Facebook Live to promote the release of Tim Heidecker's second musical album In Glendale, with episodes released sporadically at first, before evolving to a single camera video podcast, and then eventually landing on a weekly livestream and video podcast in 2020 with a higher production value and a more elaborate set. Tim Heidecker and his cohosts were seeking a more homemade outlet for their comedy after a long career of working in high profile, corporate-backed comedy ventures.

From 2016 to 2019 the show was broadcast from the Abso Lutely offices in Glendale, California. Beginning in 2020 it moved to Heidecker's garage in Glendale, California. Each episode features the hosts in conversations with other comedians (sometimes in character, and sometimes as themselves) and interviews with notable figures on a wide range of topics, as well as conversations with audience members via phone and video conference.

== Music ==
In 2018, the crew released a compilation album of original music from Office Hours Live titled Slaps, Bops And Bangers, featuring Heidecker, Berger, DJ Dougpound, as well as notable guests Fred Armisen, Nick Lutsko, Daniel Cupps, and Ben Levin.

== Notable guests and episodes ==
One notable 2021 episode of Office Hours is a 12 hour long parody of the Joe Rogan Experience, with special guests Rajat Suresh and Jeremy Levick. The episode only contains approximately 1 hour of content, but is looped to stretch the material and heighten the absurdism.

A 2022 episode of Office Hours Live features the band Pavement playing in a tennis match against Heidecker & Lussenhop, with the match edited into an sports-broadcast style highlight reel.

In 2023, comedian Kyle Mooney appeared on Office Hours Live, only to be relentlessly mocked for two hours by Heidecker, an escalation of the pair's long-running comedy feud.

In a 2025 episode with Kumail Nanjiani, the two compared notes about their own origins in the standup comedy scene and lamented the rise of the anti-woke comedy scene. Speaking on the topic, Heidecker remarked that "None of it seems particularly funny."

Other guests include Fred Armisen, "Weird Al" Yankovic, Todd Glass, Jack Black, They Might Be Giants, Paul Rudd, Sarah Sherman, Joe Keery, Mac DeMarco, Jason Schwartzman, Will Oldham, Chelsea Peretti, Weyes Blood, Natasha Lyonne, Oneohtrix Point Never, Reggie Watts, Ivy Wolk, John Early, Kate Berlant, Al Jardine, Larry Charles, Will Sasso, Bobcat Goldthwait, Thundercat, Ari Aster, Nick Kroll, Will Menaker and Matt Christman, Bret McKenzie, Kurt Vile, David Dastmalchian, Melissa Villaseñor, Open Mike Eagle, Tom Kenny, Chris Fleming, Marc Maron, Vera Drew, Rachel Zegler, Dionne Warwick, and Heidecker's frequent artistic collaborators Gregg Turkington, John C. Reilly, Rick Alverson, Mark Proksch, Bob Odenkirk, and Eric Wareheim.

== See also ==
- On Cinema
- Tim and Eric Awesome Show, Great Job!
