= Office hours (disambiguation) =

Office hours or Office Hours may refer to:

- Business hours, hours of the day in which business is commonly conducted
- "Office Hours", a cartoon strip in The Dandy beginning in 2004
- Office Hours Live, a podcast by Tim Heidecker, beginning in 2016
- Office Hours, a podcast by The Bull & Bear, the McGill University student newspaper
- Office Hours, a 2022 educational web series by Crash Course

== See also ==
- Flextime or flexitime, a flexible hours schedule for workers
