= What the Brokenhearted Do... =

- A version of the album cover with one of the tear stickers included applied to it

Studio album by Tim Heidecker
- Released: June 7, 2019
- Recorded: 2019
- Genre: Country rock; folk rock; indie rock
- Length: 33:21
- Language: English
- Label: Jagjaguwar
- Producer: Jonathan Rado

Tim Heidecker chronology
Another Year in Hell: Collected Songs from 2018 (2018)	What the Brokenhearted Do... (2019)	Fear of Death (2020)

What the Brokenhearted Do... is a 2019 album by American comedian and musician Tim Heidecker, focusing on the theme of romantic relationships and break-ups.

== Recording and release ==
Heidecker wrote it in response to an Internet hoax that he was being divorced and released the work through Jagjaguwar. He held a poll on Twitter to name the album, ultimately deciding against Cuck and Tim Crydecker. A music video for "When I Get Up" was released to promote the album. Heidecker took a more serious approach to the recordings, particularly compared to previous albums such as In Glendale.

== Reception ==
Professional ratings
Review scores
Source	Rating
AllMusic	4/5 stars
Exclaim!	8/10
Pitchfork	6.5/10

The editorial staff of All Music Guide gave the release four out of five stars, with critic Mark Deming possibly "most inspired example to date of how to respond to Internet trolling", writing that "Heidecker's voice is good, not great, but his phrasing and sense of drama is superb" and favorably comparing it to several masters of 1970s soft rock. Pitchfork's Sam Sodomsky gave a more mixed review of 6.5 out of 10, writing that he has some limitations as a songwriter but "makes a compelling case for Heidecker as a musician... [this is] his fullest musical statement yet". Vish Khanna of Exclaim! gave the album eight out of 10, summing up that it "is rich in raw songs, often short and sardonic, that revel in Tim Heidecker's unique ability to live a creative life replete with profundity and utterly misanthropic sentiments. Nobody does it better."

== Track listing ==
All songs written by Tim Heidecker

1. "Illegal" – 2:49
2. "When I Get Up" – 2:39
3. "What the Brokenhearted Do" – 3:41
4. "Funeral Shoes" – 3:04
5. "I'm Not Good Enough" – 2:10
6. "Sometimes It Happens This Way" – 4:40
7. "Insomnia" – 2:31
8. "Coffee's Gone Cold" – 3:28
9. "I Don't Think About You (Much Anymore)" – 3:34
10. "Finally Getting Over" – 3:07
11. "Life's Too Long" – 1:37

== Personnel ==
- Tim Heidecker – guitar, vocals
- Jonathan Rado – production

== See also ==
- List of 2019 albums
