= Slipping Away =

Slipping Away or Slippin' Away may refer to:

- Slipping Away (album), by Tim Heidecker, 2024
- "Slipping Away" (Dave Edmunds song), 1983
- "Slippin' Away" (Jean Shepard song), 1973
  - Slippin' Away (album), a 1973 album of the same name
- "Slipping Away" (Mansun song), 2004
- "Slipping Away" (Max Merritt and the Meteors song), 1975
- "Slipping Away" (Moby song), 2006
- "Slipping Away" (Rolling Stones song), 1989
- Slipping Away (EP), an EP by Evermore
- "Slipping Away", a song by Black Sabbath from Mob Rules
- "Slipping Away", a song by Conrad Sewell from Precious
- "Slipping Away", a song by Dope from Felons for LIFE
- "Slipping Away", a song by Gigolo Aunts from Everybody Happy
- "Slipping Away", a ballad by Hypocrisy from Abducted
- "Slipping Away", a song by Mariah Carey, a B-side from the single "Always Be My Baby"
- "Slipping Away", a track by Michael Andrews from the Donnie Darko soundtrack album
- "Slipping Away", a song by Nine Inch Nails from Things Falling Apart
- "Slipping Away", a song by Rick Astley from Whenever You Need Somebody
- "Slipping Away", a song by Stabbing Westward from Wither Blister Burn & Peel
- "Slipping Away", a song by Sum 41 from Chuck
- "Slipping Away", a song by The Ghost Inside from Get What You Give
- "Slipping Away", a song by Trust Company from The Lonely Position of Neutral
- "Slipping Away", a song by UFO from You Are Here

== See also ==
- Slip Away (disambiguation)
