= Vera Drew =

Film and television editor and director

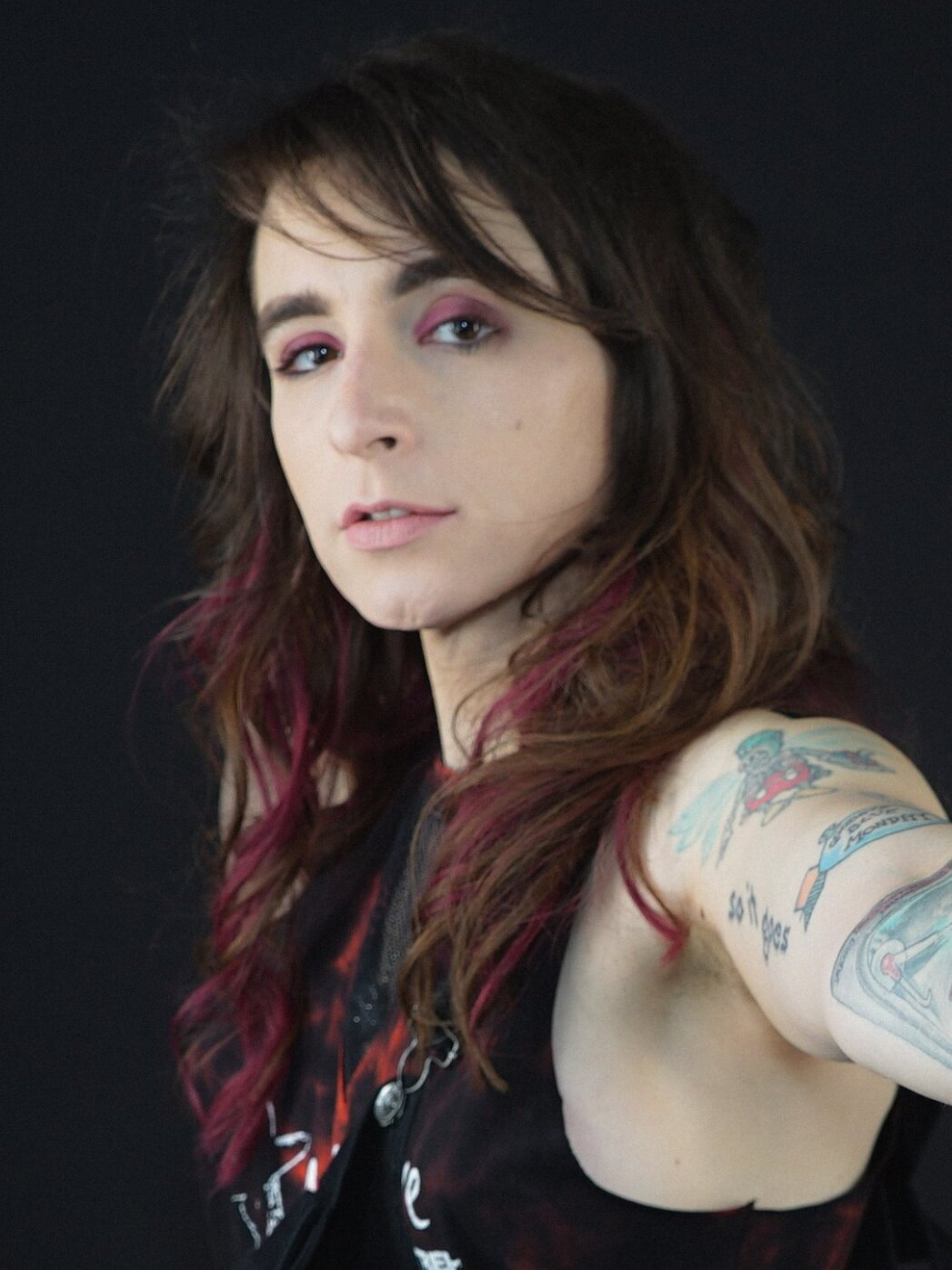
- Drew in 2019
- Born: May 22, 1989 (age 37); Chicago, Illinois, U.S.
- Occupations: Actress; director; editor; screenwriter; producer; editor
- Years active: 2009–present
- Notable work: The People's Joker
- Drew's voice Drew giving an introduction and a plea to be a Hot Topic brand ambassador
- Website: https://veradrew.com

Vera Drew is an American filmmaker, actress, and comedian. She is best known for her film The People's Joker, which she directed, wrote, produced and starred in.

== Early life ==
Drew was born in Chicago, Illinois. As a teenager, she studied improv comedy through a Second City youth pilot program.

== Career ==
Drew has worked in entertainment television since 2009, including as an editor, producer, and director on comedy shows including for On Cinema, Comedy Bang! Bang!, and Who Is America?. In 2019, Drew was nominated for a Primetime Emmy Award for Outstanding Picture Editing for Variety Programming for her work on Who Is America?.

The crowdfunded film The People's Joker, which she directed and starred in as the Joker, debuted at the 2022 Toronto International Film Festival.

== Personal life ==
Drew is a trans woman and resides in Los Angeles.

== Filmography ==
=== Film ===
Year	Title	Director	Writer	Producer	Editor	Actress	Role	Notes
2022	The People's Joker	Yes	Yes	Yes	Yes	Yes	Joker the Harlequin/Vera	
2024	Castration Movie Anthology i: Traps	No	No	Yes	No	Yes	Persephone	
2024	Carnage for Christmas	No	No	No	Yes	No	—N/a	
2025	Every Heavy Thing	No	No	No	No	Yes	Alex	
2026	Castration Movie Anthology iii: The Year of the Hyaena	No	No	Yes	No	Yes	Persephone	
TBA	Trandemic	Yes	TBA	TBA	TBA	TBA	TBA	

=== Television ===
Year	Title	Director	Editor	Other	Notes
2013	The Birthday Boys	No	Yes	No	1 episode
2013	Nathan for You	No	No	Yes	DIT; 8 episodes
2013	Tim & Eric's Bedtime Stories	No	No	Yes	DIT; 1 episode
2013–16	Comedy Bang! Bang!	No	Yes	Yes	Editor; 62 episodes DIT; 20 episodes
2014	Check It Out! with Dr. Steve Brule	No	Yes	Yes	DIT; 5 episodes
2017	Joe Mande's Award-Winning Comedy Special	No	Yes	No	TV special
2018	Alone Together	No	Yes	No	4 episodes
2018	Who Is America?	No	Yes	No	7 episodes
2019	KRFT PUNK'S Political Party!	No	Yes	No	TV special
2019	Two Pink Doors	No	Yes	No	—N/a
2020	Beef House	No	Yes	No	1 episode
2020	An Evening with Tim Heidecker	No	Yes	No	TV special
2021	I Think You Should Leave with Tim Robinson	No	Yes	No	6 episodes

=== Web series ===
Year	Title	Director	Editor	Notes
2017, 2021	On Cinema	Yes	Yes	Editor; 10 episodes (2017); Director; 10 episodes (2021)
2018–19	An Emmy for Megan	No	Yes	12 episodes
2019	Tim and Eric Qu?z Game	Yes	No	6 episodes
2019	I Love David	Yes	No	6 episodes
2019	Scum	Yes	No	6 episodes
2021	Rock House	No	Yes	—N/a

== Awards and nominations ==
Accolades
Year	Award	Category	Nominated work	Result	Ref(s)
2019	Primetime Emmy Awards	Outstanding Picture Editing for Variety Programming	Who Is America? (Note: Nominated alongside Eric Notarnicola, Roger Nygard, Mark Davies, Matt Davis, and Jeremy Cohen.)	Nominated	
2023	Chicago International Film Festival	Gold Q-Hugo	The People's Joker	Nominated	
2023	L.A. Outfest	Special Mention, North American Narrative Feature	The People's Joker	Won (Note: Shared with Erica Tremblay for Fancy Dance.)	
2023	Oslo/Fusion International Film Festival	Best Feature Narrative	The People's Joker	Won	
2023	Seattle Queer Film Festival	Best Feature Film	The People's Joker	Won	
2024	Chicago Film Critics Association Awards	Milos Stehlik Award for Breakthrough Filmmaker	The People's Joker	Nominated	
2024	Gotham Awards	Breakthrough Director	The People's Joker	Won	
2024	Los Angeles Film Critics Association Awards	New Generation Award	The People's Joker	Won	
2024	Online Film Critics Society Awards	Best Debut Feature	The People's Joker	Won	
2024	Toronto Film Critics Association Awards	Best First Feature	The People's Joker	Nominated	
2025	Austin Film Critics Association Awards	Best First Film	The People's Joker	Nominated	
2025	Austin Film Critics Association Awards	Robert R. "Bobby" McCurdy Memorial Breakthrough Artist Award (Note: Shared with Clarence Maclin (Sing Sing), Mikey Madison (Anora), Katy O'Brian (Love Lies Bleeding), and Aaron Pierre (Rebel Ridge).)	The People's Joker	Won	
2025	Dorian Awards	"We're Wilde About You!" Rising Star of the Year	The People's Joker	Nominated	
2025	Dorian Awards	LGBTQIA+ Film Trailblazer	The People's Joker	Nominated	
2025	Independent Spirit Awards	John Cassavetes Award	The People's Joker	Nominated	
