= Slip Away =

Slip Away or Slipped Away may refer to:

== Albums ==
- Slip Away (album), an album by Nell (2012)

== Songs ==
- "Slip Away" (Clarence Carter song), (1968)
- "Slip Away", a song by Ian Lloyd (1979)
- "Slip Away", a song by the Pat Metheny Group from Letter from Home (1989)
- "Slip Away", a song by Raven from Glow (1994)
- "Slip Away", a song by Mad Season from the 2013 box-set release of Above (1995)
- "Slip Away", a song by Neil Young from Broken Arrow (1996)
- "Slip Away", a song by Presidents of the United States of America from Pure Frosting (1998)
- "Slip Away", a song by Laurie Anderson from Life on a String (2001)
- "Slip Away", a song by Luke Hemmings from When Facing The Things We Turn Away From (2021)
- "Slip Away", a song by Si*Sé from Si*Sé (2001)
- "Slip Away", a song by David Bowie from Heathen (2002)
- "Slip Away", a song by 112 from Hot & Wet (2003)
- "Slip Away", a song by Perfume Genius from No Shape (2017)
- "Slipaway", a section of the song "Street Hassle" by Lou Reed (1978)
- "Slip Away (A Warning)", a song by Lou Reed and John Cale from Songs for Drella (1990)
- "Slipped Away", a song by Toto from Tambu (1995)
- "Slipped Away", a song by Avril Lavigne from Under My Skin (2004)
- "Slip Away", a song by Ultravox from Ultravox! (1977)

== See also ==
- Slipping Away (disambiguation)
