= Fear of Death =

Studio album by Tim Heidecker
- Released: September 25, 2020
- Recorded: 2020
- Studios: Electro-Vox, Los Angeles, California, United States; Heidecker's home, Glendale, California, United States; Sonora Recorders, Los Angeles, California, United States; Spacebomb Studios, Richmond, Virginia, United States (strings); Valentine Recording Studio, Valley Village, California, United States
- Genre: Pop rock
- Length: 40:48
- Language: English
- Label: Spacebomb
- Producers: Drew Erickson; Tim Heidecker; Natalie Mering; Jonathan Rado (additional)

Tim Heidecker chronology
What the Broken-Hearted Do... (2019)	Fear of Death (2020)	High School (2022)

Fear of Death is a concept album from American comedian and musician Tim Heidecker, released on September 25, 2020, through Spacebomb Records. It received positive reviews from critics.

== Recording and release ==
There’s a part of me that’s always kind of liked when things go to hell, because it gets me out of work.

— Heidecker on being unable to promote Fear of Death due to the COVID-19 pandemic

Heidecker met Natalie Mering after she recorded an episode of his Office Hours podcast in January 2019 and the duo performed a cover of "Let It Be" for a charity event that June. Mering's bandmate Drew Erickson suggested that they go to the studio to record new material together. Heidecker composed most songs solo, with Mering adding to two tracks; the lyrical themes of death, regret, and existential reflection were not deliberate but Heidecker realized these came out of his own personal anxieties in middle age. Heidecker announced the album on August 5, 2020, and released a music video of an in-studio performance of the title track.

Audio of "Nothing" was released on August 26, followed by "Property" on September 16. Heidecker previewed "Oh How We Drift Away" on September 22 and announced several online promotional events: a Reddit AMA, an episode of his Office Hours podcast devoted to the album, and a virtual car ride via the Drive & Listen website that previewed the release three days early. The music video for "Property" was released on October 8.

== Critical reception ==
Album of the Year sums up critical consensus as a 79 out of 100 with two reviews. Once "Nothing" was previewed, the magazine named it another one of the best songs of that week as well. Writing for Exclaim!, Vish Khanna gave the album a nine out of 10, praising his songwriting by comparing it to Elton John, John Lennon, and Paul Simon's, considering it "strikingly timeless and authentic rock music, helmed by an underground Renaissance man".

In Paste, Max Freedman rated the album a 6.7 out of 10, noting solid songwriting and musicianship but criticizing the mixture of comedy and seriousness: "While this sentiment bears the album’s full thematic gravity, there’s something undeniably comical about how much heart the two put into this almost hokey bout of existentialism against the song’s simultaneously somber and jovial music."

In The Observer, Ryan Israel compares the album favorably to Big Star and Carole King, giving it four out of five stars. Under the Radar considered the song "Fear of Death" one of its 10 best songs of the week, with reviewer Samantha Small praising the musicianship. The publication's review of the album by Caleb Campbell rated it eight out of 10, praising Heidecker for successfully drawing on his inspiration of 1970s pop rock and not being too weighed down by his other career in comedy. Paste included this in their five best rock albums of September 2020, with reviewer Max Freedman praising it for being timely and mixing comedy with solid songwriting.

== Track listing ==
All songs composed by Tim Heidecker, except where noted.

1. "Prelude to Feeling" – 1:22
2. "Come Away with Me" – 3:07
3. "Backwards" – 3:50
4. "Fear of Death" – 4:00
5. "Someone Who Can Handle You" – 3:42
6. "Nothing" (Tim Heidecker and Natalie Mering) – 2:59
7. "Say Yes" – 5:26
8. "Property" – 3:31
9. "Little Lamb" – 2:29
10. "Let It Be" (Lennon–McCartney) – 2:30
11. "Long as I’ve Got You" – 2:18
12. "Oh How We Drift Away" (Heidecker and Mering) – 5:34

== Personnel ==
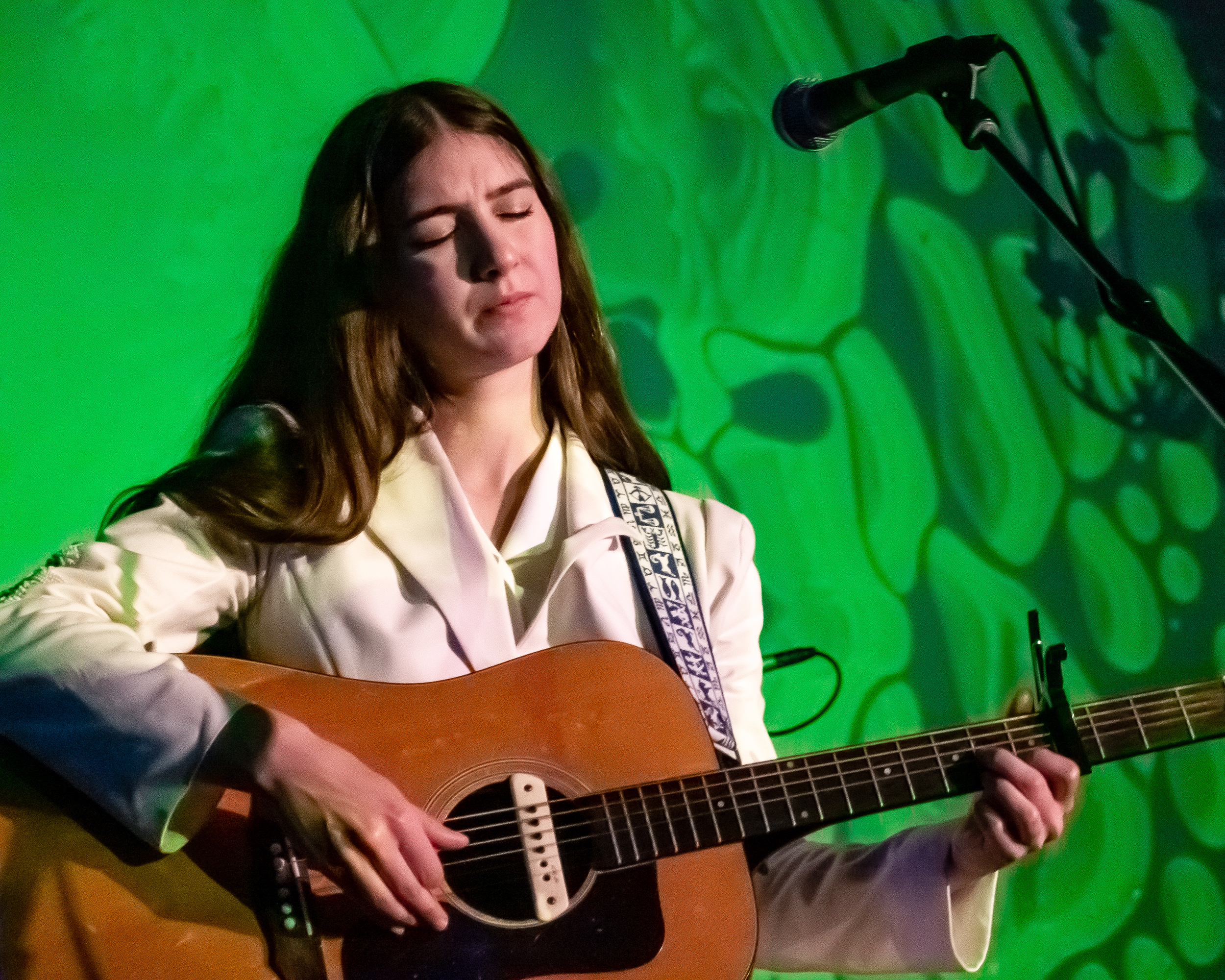
Weyes Blood (credited as Natalie Mering) collaborates throughout Fear of Death and co-wrote two of the songs

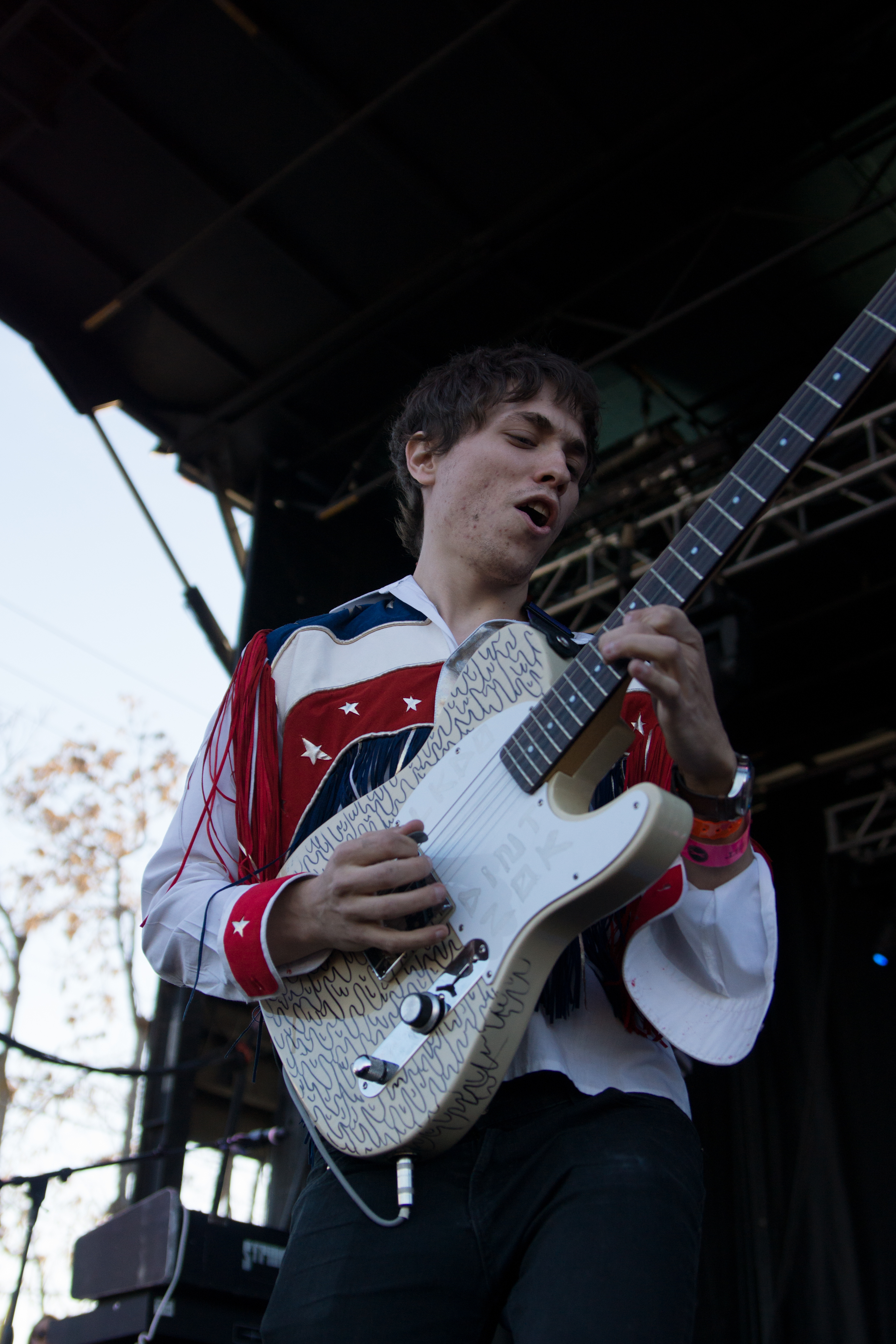
Jonathan Rado (pictured in 2015 with Foxygen) added instrumentation and additional production to the album

- Tim Heidecker – guitar, vocals, production

Additional musicians

- Josh Adams – drums, percussion
- Eliana Athayde – bass guitar
- Stephanie Barrett – cello
- Johanna Beaver – viola
- Mike Bloom – guitar
- Naima Burrs – violin
- Brian D'Addario – bass guitar, electric and acoustic guitar, vocals, mellotron
- Michael D'Addario – drums, electric guitar, vocals
- Zach Dawes – bass guitar
- Drew Erickson – piano, organ, drums, celeste, Wurlitzer, mellotron, string synthesizer, production
- Connor ‘Catfish’ Gallaher – pedal steel guitar
- Treesa Gold – violin
- Peter Greydanus – cello
- Alison Hall – violin
- Jeannette Jang – violin
- Jordan Katz – horns
- Benji Lysaght – electric guitar
- Stacy Matthews – violin
- Natalie Mering – piano, backing vocals, production, lead vocals on "Oh How We Drift Away"
- Stella Mozgawa – drums, percussion
- Adrian Pintea – violin
- Trey Pollard – string arrangements
- Jonathan Rado – bass guitar, acoustic guitar, mellotron, piano, percussion, EMS Synthi, additional production
- David Ralicke – horns
- Ellen Riccio – violin
- Meredith Riley – violin
- Kim Ryan – viola
- Molly Sharp – viola
- Schuyler Slack – cello

Technical personnel

- Robert Beatty – artwork
- Sean Cook – engineering, mixing
- Alex De Jong – string recording at Spacebomb Studios in Richmond, Virginia
- Kenny Gilmore – engineering, mixing
- Michael Harris – engineering
- Travis Pavur – additional engineering
- Travis Robertson – design
- Sarah Tudzin – engineering

== See also ==
- 2020 in American music
- List of 2020 albums
