= Too Dumb for Suicide: Tim Heidecker's Trump Songs =

Too Dumb for Suicide: Tim Heidecker’s Trump Songs

Studio album by Tim Heidecker
- Released: 2017
- Genre: Comedy
- Length: 36:09
- Label: Jagjaguwar

Tim Heidecker chronology
Too Dumb for Suicide: Tim Heidecker’s Trump Songs (2017)	Another Year In Hell: Collected Songs from 2018 (2018)

Professional ratings
Review scores
Source	Rating
Pitchfork	6.9/10
Robert Christgau	B+

Too Dumb for Suicide: Tim Heidecker's Trump Songs is a 2017 album by American musician and comedian Tim Heidecker. The album compiles parody songs critical of Donald Trump released by Heidecker over the course of Trump's first presidency.

== Track listing ==
Too Dumb for Suicide: Tim Heidecker's Trump Songs track listing
No.	Title	Length
1.	"Trump Tower"	2:59
2.	"Imperial Bathroom"	2:40
3.	"Richard Spencer"	2:48
4.	"For Chan"	3:14
5.	"Mar a Lago"	5:11
6.	"Trump's Private Pilot"	1:55
7.	"MAGA"	2:32
8.	"Wilbur Ross"	4:03
9.	"Cooked Chinese Chicken"	2:25
10.	"Trump Talkin' Nukes"	2:40
11.	"Sentencing Day"	2:22
12.	"Trump's Private Pilot" (Father John Misty Version)	3:20
Total length:		36:09
