= The People's Joker =

- Theatrical release poster
- Directed by: Vera Drew
- Written by: Bri LeRose; Vera Drew
- Produced by: Joey Lyons
- Starring: Vera Drew; Lynn Downey; Christian Calloway; Griffin Kramer; Kane Distler; Nathan Faustyn; Phil Braun; David Liebe Hart; Scott Aukerman; Tim Heidecker; Maria Bamford; Bob Odenkirk
- Cinematography: Nate Cornett
- Edited by: Vera Drew
- Music by: Justin Krol; Quinn Scharber; Danni Rowan; Elias and the Error
- Production company: Haunted Gay Ride Productions
- Distributed by: Altered Innocence
- Release dates: September 13, 2022 (TIFF); April 5, 2024 (United States)
- Running time: 92 minutes
- Country: United States
- Language: English

The People's Joker is a 2022 American superhero parody film directed by Vera Drew, and written by Vera Drew and Bri LeRose. The film unofficially parodies characters from the Batman comics, and the main character is a transgender woman based on the Joker, played by Drew. The film also features Scott Aukerman, Tim Heidecker, Maria Bamford, David Liebe Hart, Robert Wuhl (who also starred in 1989's Batman), and Bob Odenkirk in supporting roles. The film premiered on September 13, 2022, at the 2022 Toronto International Film Festival, but subsequent planned screenings of the film at the festival were canceled due to "rights issues." However, the film did eventually receive wider release, with a screening at the Outfest film festival in 2023, followed by limited theatrical screenings and home media in 2024.

== Plot ==
In a dystopian world monitored by Batman and run by a mysterious fascist regime with no specific ideology, a young child grows up in Smallville, Kansas, idolizing the performers on a sketch comedy program, UCB Live. The protagonist's mother is disturbed when her child asks, "Was I born in the wrong body?" and immediately books a session with Dr. Crane of the conversion therapy clinic Arkham Asylum, who prescribes Smylex: a drug that forces its users to put on a happy face, even if they feel depression, anxiety, or gender dysphoria, but is also highly addictive.

Fifteen years later, the protagonist has grown up and moves to Gotham City to join the cast of UCB Live, designated as a "Jokeman" by a computer, who will be allowed to have an individual identity in the cast, unlike the women, who are all assigned to be nameless Harlequins that serve as back-up dancers. The process to become on-air talent includes paying $15,000 and enduring improv comedy classes from UCB cast member Ra's al Ghul. The protagonist strikes up a friendship with Oswald Cobblepot, another struggling comedian who cannot afford the entrance fee and the duo decide that they will instead make their own comedy troupe. To avoid rules that outlaw unapproved humor, they will call their act "anti-comedy".

They set up at a dilapidated carnival and are quickly joined by a number of law-breaking comedians with their own deliberately unfunny and uncomfortable acts. One of these is Jason "Mr. J" Todd, who dresses as a Joker of his own and tells Marxist observational humor. Mr. J and the hero immediately strike up a bond and go on a date that includes Mr. J's confession that he is a transgender man, and has previously escaped an abusive relationship. This helps encourage the protagonist to articulate that she is a transgender woman and the two plot to have her dive into a vat of estrogen to gender transition.

A retired Batman appears to stop them and it leaves Mr. J shaken. Mr. J reveals that his ex is Batman, who adopted Mr. J and trained him as his sidekick Robin. He later assisted with a gender transition to the identity of Jason Todd, but their relationship became toxic and sexual.

The protagonist takes the name of Joker the Harlequin: a woman with a comedic identity of her own who is trying to be happy but is stuck in the abusive and self-sabotaging patterns of Mr. J. When Joker is breaking up with Mr. J and hacks into a broadcast of UCB Live, daring producer Lorne Michaels to let her host instead of Batman, Michaels agrees. In order to host, Joker has to go through a rapid-fire comedy training course with Ra's al Ghul, who teaches her that she is destined to be the People's Joker who makes comedy legal again.

On the night of the show, Michaels pumps Smylex into the crowd to ensure that they laugh no matter what Joker says and she finally has a moment where she understands what she needs to be happy and how it cannot come from validation from outsiders. She materializes in the Fifth Dimension alongside the powerful Mx. Mxyzptlk who offers to rearrange the time stream for Joker. She asks that her old friend Oswald be given the fame and power of Batman. For herself she only asks to have one happy memory from childhood: she has a vision of 1992, riding in the car with mom, as they sing along to "The Joker" and laugh.

After the credits, the audience are told that Joker will return in The People's Nightmare: Freddy vs Joker and the glove of Freddy Krueger appears on screen.

== Cast ==
- Vera Drew as Joker the Harlequin/Vera, a trans woman from Smallville trying to break into the world of stand-up comedy.
  - Griffin Kramer as a young, pre-transition Vera, whose deadname is bleeped.
- Lynn Downey as Vera's mother
- Kane Distler as Mr. J, an emotionally manipulative trans man who is a composite of Jason Todd and the Jared Leto incarnation of the Joker from Suicide Squad.
- Nathan Faustyn as The Penguin, Joker's slacker friend and another aspiring comedian.
- David Liebe Hart as Ra's al Ghul, the emcee of UCB, Gotham City's only comedy showcase.
- Phil Braun as Batman, a closeted gay man with far-right politics, who was Mr. J's abuser.
- Maria Bamford as Lorne Michaels, the controlling producer of UCB. Saturday Night Live star Sarah Sherman originally voiced the role but asked to be recast following the Toronto Film Festival premiere.
- Christian Calloway as Dr. Jonathan Crane, who prescribes the young Vera with Smylex, an ineffective antidepressant with grotesque side effects.
- Trevor Drinkwater as The Riddler, another aspiring comedian.
- Ruin Carroll as Poison Ivy, a non-binary aspiring comedian.
- Tim Heidecker as Perry White, a belligerent Alex Jones-style political commentator.
- Scott Aukerman as Mr. Freeze
- Bob Odenkirk as Bob the Goon
- Arden Hughes as the UCB Computer
- Dan Curry as Bane
- Robert Wuhl as himself, an actor in superhero films appearing via a Cameo
- Alec Robbins as Mr. Boop
- Cricket Arrison as the Creeper. Film critic/bartender Mike Vanderbilt originally appeared as The Creeper in early versions of the film but was recast after sexual assault allegations were made against him.
- Mia Moore Marchant as The Huntress
- Ember Knight as Mxy
- Sandy Honig as Mr. Boop's Wife
- Eliot Glazer as Lil Timmy Too Times
- Denali Winter as Clark Kent
- Bambi Belle as Lois Lane
- Rome L. Davis as the Social Worker

== Production ==
In late 2019, co-writer Bri LeRose encouraged Vera Drew to re-edit the film Joker. While working on the re-edit, Drew began to think about how the characters reflected her own life, stating "I knew I needed to do some sort of big creative project around gender, comedy, and mom issues". Drew originally planned to re-edit "every single Batman movie" along with other films to make the film, but those scenes were later edited out. Drew crowdsourced both the budget for the production and the artwork; more than 100 artists provided backdrops and character animation for the film. In the process, the final film became a coming-of-age story and not merely a parody.

== Release ==
According to Drew, "a media conglomerate" sent her "an angry letter (misreported as a 'cease and desist') pressuring to not screen" shortly before the premiere. Some media outlets assumed this to be Warner Bros. Discovery, the parent company to DC Comics, but neither Drew nor Warner Bros. have confirmed this.

On September 14, 2022, a day after the film had premiered at the Toronto International Film Festival, subsequent screenings of the film were canceled. The website for TIFF stated, "The filmmaker has withdrawn this film due to rights issues". The film has attempted to receive copyright exemption under fair use for being a parody, and a title card displayed before the film began stated "Any copyright or trademark infringement was not done intentionally", among other things. In a statement to Variety, Drew said: "We're looking for buyers and distribution partners who will protect us and make this film accessible to trans people and their families everywhere".

On September 21, Drew publicly announced cancellation of the film's other scheduled festival screenings. It was still screened sureptitiously at venues like the 2023 Wisconsin Film Festival, where it was billed for an April 14 date as a "Secret Screening".

Following limited screenings in the spring of 2023, The People's Joker was screened at the 2023 Outfest film festival in Los Angeles on July 15, 2023. It was officially released theatrically in the United States on April 5, 2024.

On May 6, 2024, Vera Drew confirmed in an X post that The People's Joker would be released on physical media and streaming platforms by the end of the year. On July 30, 2024, distributor Altered Innocence announced that the film was released on video on demand platforms AppleTV, Amazon, Vudu, Vimeo, and Google Play/YouTube.

=== Reception ===
On the review aggregator website Rotten Tomatoes, 96% of 115 critics' reviews are positive, with an average rating of 8.0/10. The website's consensus reads: "The People's Joker uses classic characters in impressively inventive ways, working within a familiar framework to tell an invigorating story of self-acceptance." Metacritic, which uses a weighted average, assigned the film a score of 78 out of 100, based on 23 critics, indicating "generally favorable" reviews.

Richard Brody of The New Yorker considered the film to be "the best superhero movie I've ever seen", and listed the film as one of the best films of 2024.

Peter Debruge of Variety described the film as "reflect[ing] the deliberately outrageous, ironically distanced variety found in internet memes and Adult Swim series" and as "using millennial meta-irony ... to critique the institutions [Drew] once held dear". Katie Rife of Polygon stated, "in an age where corporate IP has become a de facto religion in global cinema culture, The People's Joker is a blasphemous Molotov cocktail of a movie, with a unique and valuable point of view. And it's hilarious, too". Jude Dry of IndieWire gave it a B+ and wrote: "Underneath the satirical madness lies a genuinely moving story of self-acceptance, self-love, and the inspiring act of an artist stepping into her power. All jokes aside, the people deserve to see it."

== Accolades ==
The film was nominated for the John Cassavetes Award at the 40th Independent Spirit Awards. Drew was nominated and won for Breakthrough Director at the 34th Annual Gotham Awards.
