= Slipping Away (album) =

Studio album by Tim Heidecker
- Released: October 18, 2024
- Genre: Americana
- Length: 34:05
- Label: Bloodshot Records
- Producer: Tim Heidecker

Tim Heidecker chronology
Live In Boulder (2023)	Slipping Away (2024)

Slipping Away is a 2024 studio album by comedian and folk rock musician Tim Heidecker. The album was released by Bloodshot Records and received positive reviews from critics.

== Background ==
Following the release of 2022's High School, Heidecker set out to release a "100% earnest" album reflecting his experiences with aging, personal anxiety and fatherhood. The track "Hey, Would You Call My Mom For Me?" was inspired by a real interaction Heidecker had with a young man suffering from addiction in Vancouver.

== Release ==
On July 9, 2024, Heidecker released the single "Well's Running Dry", accompanied with a music video and an announcement for a new album titled Slipping Away. A second promotional single, "Like I Do", was released on August 12, 2024. On September 16, 2024, a third promotional single, "Dad of the Year", was released with an accompanying music video. The album was released on October 18, 2024.

== Critical reception ==
Slipping Away received generally positive reviews. In a review for Northern Transmissions, Greg Walker complimented the earnestness of the songwriting, noting Heidecker's ability to subtly infuse humour into his lyrics without them losing meaning.

== Track listing ==
All songs written by Tim Heidecker

No.	Title	Length
1.	"Well's Running Dry"	2:43
2.	"Trippin' (Slippin')"	4:19
3.	"Like I Do"	3:05
4.	"Dad of the Year"	2:32
5.	"Bottom of the 8th"	3:03
6.	"Something Somewhere"	4:17
7.	"Bows and Arrows"	2:36
8.	"Hey, Would You Call My Mom for Me"	3:02
9.	"I Went into Town"	3:10
10.	"Bells Are Ringing"	5:12

== See also ==
- 2024 in American music
- 2024 in rock music
- List of 2024 albums
