= InfoWars (The Onion) =

American comedy and media platform

- Created by: The Onion
- Owner: Global Tetrahedron
- Years: 2026
- Based on: Infowars

Miscellaneous
- Genres: Comedy, parody, satire, internet culture
- Also known as: (The) Real InfoWars, (the) new and improved InfoWars (Note: The Onion also brands its InfoWars as the "new and improved" version of Jones' original Infowars.)

Official website
- Official website

InfoWars, also branded as Real InfoWars, is a comedy and media platform run and owned by American satirical news outlet The Onion that debuted in July 2026. It is a parodic reboot of the original news website Infowars created and managed by Alex Jones from 1999 until 2026. The Onion's InfoWars began broadcasting live on YouTube on July 2, 2026, featuring two programs: The Jim Haggerty Show and Emergency with Tim Heidecker.

== History ==
=== Pre-debut (2022–2026) ===
Courts had ordered Jones to pay approximately $1.4 billion in damages to the families of the victims of the Sandy Hook Elementary School shooting after he lost a defamation lawsuit. During Jones' bankruptcy proceedings, Infowars was initially licensed to The Onion in a deal with the court-appointed manager of the property. Although a Texas appeals court officially paused the acquisition following an appeal by Jones, The Onion pressed ahead with the production of its parody programming with comedian Tim Heidecker as creative director.

==== The Onion's plan of turning Infowars into a parody site ====
Speaking in an interview with Time, Tim Heidecker claimed that he initially plans to turn Infowars into a parody of itself, portraying it as a conspiracy media network that mainly feeds on the audience's rage and fear, like Jones did during his management and ownership of it, stating:

I think there'll be a transition phase where we're doing kind of Onion-style parody, satire, reflecting back the absurdities of Infowars and the right-wing media culture. Not so much the political stuff, but sort of just the hacky supplements and trying to bilk your grandparents out of their life savings kind of style. We want to kind of let that run its course, and play in that sandbox for a little while. Then we just think that that's going to get old, but we'll have built this little brand, or sort of re-established a brand and turn it into a destination for good comedy— a new streaming site, a new comedy platform.

According to Brad Holbrook, who portrays Jim Haggerty, The Onion's head of video, Ryan Natoli, envisioned Haggerty as a disgraced television host running an archetypal populist independent show. Holbrook stated in an interview with AV Club:

I [got] an email from [Onion video head] Ryan Natoli in Chicago. He said, "We're all thinking about Jim Haggerty. Clearly he's been fired from his hosting job, and now he's the Steve Bannon, Tucker Carlson, jaded, provocateur, conspiracy theorist, angered by the system that did him wrong, so he's going to come after them on a podcast. Could you wear that persona?" That's right up my alley. I'm not a conspiracy theorist per se, but I've been around the block long enough. I've seen it all, and there's ample reason to be disgusted by what the world is today, and I'd be more than happy to make fun of it any way I could.

The Onion raised funds through merchandise sales of the rebranded rainbow gradient Infowars logo sporting The Onion's logo in place of the letter "O" and, after relaunching the site, donated $100,000 to the Sandy Hook families, who had not yet received any court-ordered payment from Jones. The Onion's InfoWars began broadcasting live on YouTube on July 2, 2026, 20:00 EDT, featuring the two programs The Jim Haggerty Show and Emergency with Tim Heidecker.

=== Debut and shows (2026–present) ===
In the first episode of Emergency, Heidecker claimed that Jones died and was replaced with an impostor, presented in the show as fact with a video of him suddenly "popping like a balloon" inside his car. Heidecker had done so as a method of "wish fulfillment" for victims and to attract Jones' attention with a deliberately false, nonsensical death claim. Heidecker does not plan to make Jones the sole focus of Emergency, intending to eventually pivot its format into a platform for new comedians and pay the Sandy Hook families the money he claims "Jones will never pay", and the show's focus into his life "falling apart".

Speaking to Fast Company, Heidecker then stated:

For the short term we’re gonna take direct shots at what everyone thinks of as InfoWars and goof on that pretty directly. We’ve been calling that phase one. Then phase two is to become a player and a competitor to the various . . . social media platforms.”

Throughout the streams, The Onion has begun selling merchandise related to both variants of InfoWars, such as "Demon Guard" bandages that promise to protect the wearer from demonic influence, and plushies and stickers of gay frogs, referencing Jones' previous claims of atrazine turning them homosexual.

== Overview ==
=== YouTube channel ===
==== "InfoWars Summer" (July 2, 2026 – September 10, 2026) ====
A weekly InfoWars stream consists of an intro related to "The InfoWars Elf", the show's proposed mascot, which was rejected by The Onion's parent company; Global Tetrahedron, in the show's metafictional narrative, followed by an episode of The Jim Haggerty Show and one of Emergency; with short satirical product infomercials, vertical video skits, and membership subscription ads for The Onion between them; airing on YouTube each Thursday at 20:00 EDT.

==== "InfoWars Fall" (September 10, 2026 – present) ====
A weekly InfoWars stream airs on YouTube each Thursday at 19:00 CST with special presentation episodes and the weekly show InfoWars Nerve Center. The satiric product infomercials from the debut season, both for the fictional products and the real products released by The Onion; and skits with the spinning InfoWars screen bug continue in the form of short-form on-demand video content. These infomercials are typically hosted by actor Troy Dillinger.

=== Website ===
==== theonion.info ====
Since the debut of InfoWars, The Onion has used the initial domain "theonion.info" to demonstrate their own version of Jones' original and currently inactive "infowars.com", with a simplistic interactive design based after the spinning InfoWars screen bug and spoof image based ads that have been prepared by both The Onion and InfoWars; with an "alarm button" that causes the entire website content move away by itself to a certain distance and spin as various imagery takes the role of a background. After the debut of InfoWars Nerve Center, the website has been updated and moved to "therealinfowars.com" with the focus of the content being streamed over YouTube instead of Jones' conspiracy theory articles and daily streamed live content based approach, with the old .info domain extension currently routing to the original content of the new .com domain.

==== therealinfowars.com ====
The new and current website has a spinning globe with three 3D InfoWars wordmarks consisting of clickable episodes and shorts that have been previously uploaded on YouTube, an episode guide per show with a countdown for currently airing shows, a separate page for an embedded Bluesky feed of their official account to deliver new social media posts, and a schedule for the upcoming episodes of their shows. It also has a new "surf" section where the visitors can simulate a digital television setting with latest episodes, an EPG of upcoming episodes, randomly ordered short-form ads made by The Onion and appeared on past InfoWars episodes under a separate paid programming channel, and past episodes of shows in the shape of multiple and separate channels.

== Shows ==
Just as Jones' original Infowars acts like an online media network/television channel with a programming schedule, the reboot InfoWars has multiple shows aired each week per episode. Separate on-demand episodes of each show and edited VOD versions of the broadcasts may also be uploaded on the YouTube channel between each stream.

=== Debuted in July 2026 ===
- The Jim Haggerty Show: A parodic conspiratorial right-wing video podcast series starring Jim Haggerty, a fictional former morning news show host turned podcaster who used to host Onion News Network's satirical Today Now! segments and previously starred in the web series Porkin' Across America; claiming to speak about governmental misdeeds despite the danger allegedly inherent to the act. Each week, he hosts a guest where he talks about a singular topic for the entirety of the episode, such as CIA cover-ups or Christianity, but rapidly jumps between subtopics between them, often followed by asking the guest about the possibility of being made into a martyr for his claims and stances without actually dying.
- Emergency with Tim Heidecker (shortened to Emergency): The first main show hosted on InfoWars where the host, Tim Heidecker, talked about events in the fashion of Alex Jones with the same rapid-fire, conspiratorial style, often stuttering and screaming over his guests and callers. With Heidecker's death within the show's fiction, the show gained a new and final host, Phil Braun, on its last episode.

=== Debuted in September 2026 ===
- Week of Miracles: The first special presentation episode of InfoWars about televangelists performing miracles on stage, presented by Vic Berger and Ben Craw.
- Alpha Child System: The second special presentation episode of InfoWars where the schoolchildren are trained to become a stereotypical alpha male that dominated amongst the society, presented by Jay Weingarten with the first major speaking role of The InfoWars Elf since his debut.

=== Debuted in October 2026 ===
- The Tim Heidecker Podcast: The third special presentation episode of InfoWars where Heidecker returns back to host a video podcast.
- InfoWars HQ: The fourth special presentation episode of InfoWars about the happenings in the headquarters of the show behind the cameras, with a compilation of newer skits that haven't been released before.
- InfoWars Nerve Center: The first weekly main show on InfoWars debuting on InfoWars Fall with new hosts since Emergency, that's been described as the brain of the movement without any focus on conspiracy type of fake news of the former.

== Episodes ==
=== The Jim Haggerty Show ===
On-demand title	Livestream title	Episode number	Release date
EXPOSING CIA SECRETS: Jeffrey Epstein, JFK, and September 9/11	Alex Jones Is Dead - Real InfoWars Stream	1	July 2, 2026
Haggerty consults ex-CIA analyst Neil Riker (Phil Braun) regarding various CIA cover-ups. Jeffrey Epstein's operations are alleged to reach "all the way to the almost top", permeating multiple layers of the government but excluding the president. John F. Kennedy is alleged to have been assassinated and that his suicide note was just a forgery. Riker also reveals that there is footage proving that multiple hijacked aircraft destroyed the World Trade Center on 9/11.
This Is Why Big Pharma Is TERRIFIED Of Fish Milk	InfoWars Summer - Live Stream July 9, 2026	2	July 9, 2026 (livestream) July 10, 2026 (on-demand episode)
Haggerty consults "medical patriot" Mr. Docter [sic] Eastbrook about elites having poisoned public water to prevent fish from producing milk and hoarded unpoisoned fish and their milk for themselves. Eastbrook claims that their milk could cure multiple diseases and double consumers' IQs.
TRADWIFE Explains What Happened to Good Christian Conservative Men	InfoWars Demon Hunting - Livestream July 16, 2026	3	July 16, 2026
Haggerty consults "tradwife" Callie McClean about the traditional American family life: homeschooling children, daily homeschool shooting drills, prohibiting them from going in bathrooms, replacing toilet water with breast milk, and spending 18 hours per day inside a small metal crate.
IS GOD REAL? Unlocking The Bible's Hidden Truths	InfoWars Alex Jones Bombshell - Live Stream July 23, 2026	4	July 23, 2026
Haggerty consults biblical expert Robin Thacker about matters related to the Bible's content, such as the amount of commandments in it, whether or not God is real, and the possibility of Jesus becoming addicted to pornography in his second coming. Haggerty plans on "watching up" all the pornography in the world to prevent that.
CONSERVATIVE HERO Is FIGHTING For The 2nd Amendment	InfoWars Super Malaria Emergency - Live Stream July 30, 2026	5	July 30, 2026
Haggerty consults eight year-old Lucas Reilly about an incident in which he accidentally killed his parents with a gun in their closet, had the gun confiscated by police, and was taken to live with his grandmother. Despite Reilly's trauma and desire to go home, Haggerty paints him as a heroic Republican figure and has him read an ad.
HORRORS OF WAR: Former Navy Seal Reveals How Badass They Are	InfoWars Hell - Live Stream August 6, 2026	6	August 6, 2026
Haggerty consults alleged Sergeant Steve Michaels about his killing of Osama bin Laden, where he previously killed multiple unrelated people across 40 missions, including multiple men, women, elderly people, and children, believing all of them to have been Bin Laden. When he finally killed Bin Laden, Michaels found thousands of Chuck E. Cheese tokens in his possession. Michaels is kept up at night wondering which prize Bin Laden would have claimed if they had not stopped him. Michaels continues to get revenge for 9/11 by watching Bin Laden's secret stash of pornography every morning in its entirety.
KILLING DEATH: The Anti-Aging Method That Biohacked Mortality	InfoWars Mourns - Live Stream August 13, 2026	7	August 13, 2026
Haggerty consults "Project Everlife" founder Bear Smithsonian, who wants to grant people immortality via drugs, electronic devices, body part swapping, and resurrection so he can be young and wealthy forever. Part of the regimen is replacing sleep with intermittent dying four to five times per day: he takes a pill that kills him, and when his watch chimes (and not a moment sooner) his spotter injects him with a large syringe of the antidote. Smithsonian demonstrates the pill during the interview and dies. When his watch starts beeping about 45 minutes later, Haggerty administers the injection. Not knowing where to inject it, he jams the syringe into the base of the skull. Haggerty is too flustered to inject the entire dose and leaves the syringe in his head. Then the watch starts chiming and Haggerty realizes that he has bungled the procedure.
MAKING A MARTYR: The Interview With My AI Assassin	InfoWars Rebooted - Live Stream August 20, 2026	8 (Season 1 finale)	August 20, 2026
Haggerty consults a chatbot he claims accurately depicts an image of his would-be killer, and uses it to predict how he would be killed and how the world would grieve his martyrdom. The chatbot is unhelpful, constantly malfunctions, its image and identity are constantly changing between exaggerated depictions of leftists (culminating into a caricature of Bin Laden), and it hallucinates everything but its threat to visit his podcast's address and kill him. It then turns into an imitation of Haggerty's past iteration in Today Now!, where it mocks his past as a mouthpiece and pig and predicts that no one will be bothered by his absence. The chatbot's Bin Laden-like depiction cuts the fake Haggerty's throat and the real Haggerty grazes himself with a bullet ricochet in a state of AI psychosis.

=== Emergency with Tim Heidecker ===
On-demand title	Livestream title	Episode number	Release date
🚨 Infowars Chief Issues Emergency Statement	N/A (Note: Due to this video being uploaded on The Onion's own YouTube channel prior to the July 2 debut of InfoWars, this video has no livestream title during its premiere.)	0	May 1, 2026
Heidecker announces that Infowars and its staff have been taken down, that he and The Onion are continuing the "fight" against them to assist the Sandy Hook shooting's victims, that he has stolen and is wearing Alex Jones' skin, and that he has achieved an alliance between God and Satan. He takes calls from Donald Trump, (Note: The caller is not the real political figure, but an actor acting as one. For the purposes of the show's fiction, they are addressed as if they were the real people.) a normal man named Phil, and anonymous caller "AJ", the latter of whom claims to not be Alex Jones and agrees to go on trips and have sex with Heidecker.
Emergency with Tim Heidecker - ALEX JONES POPPED LIKE A BALLOON	Alex Jones Is Dead - Real InfoWars Stream	1	July 2, 2026
Heidecker claims that Jones has exploded and consults forensics expert Lester Reeve regarding the possible cause, Austinite Whataburger worker Phil about Jones' order in the day of his death, and Ohioan caller Tim (Tim Robinson) about comparisons between Jones' impostor and different depictions of Bozo the Clown, alleging that he is a character portrayed by multiple actors. Heidecker then claims that Phoenicians control the world from hell via its invention of the concept of alphabets.
Emergency with Tim Heidecker - FAKE ALEX JONES REVEALED	InfoWars Summer - Live Stream July 9, 2026	2	July 9, 2026 (livestream) July 10, 2026 (on-demand)
With Jones' death revealed, Heidecker accuses the current Alex Jones who stars in Alex Jones Live of being a clone due to a different facial structure and voice, and repeatedly insults both in the process. He invites audio expert Stan Bennett to analyze both of their voices to determine which is real, and receives Austinite caller Phil about his music piracy website and having known Jones in high school. Heidecker then takes calls from Trump who announces a truce with Iran, war with Israel, and plans of reenacting 9/11 to destroy the United States, and Robert F. Kennedy Jr. who has a bird on his head. Heidecker announces the "Make Austin Jonestown Already" (MAJA) movement to honor Jones' death.
Emergency with Tim Heidecker - DEMONOLOGIST PROVES EX-WIFE WRONG!	InfoWars Demon Hunting - Live Stream July 16, 2026	3	June 16, 2026 (livestream) June 17, 2026 (on-demand)
In expanding theories and claims about Jones' death, Heidecker consults demonologist Cindy Jo Hinkleman about demonic possession and how possessed various celebrities and fictional characters are, and to see Jones' state in Hell. Heidecker receives a call from his soon-to-be ex-wife Chesapeake (Edi Patterson) who accuses him of being a poor husband with demonically possessed genitalia, advises Hinkleman to avoid or investigate him, and threatens to kill and cook their horse Horace.
Emergency with Tim Heidecker - JONES MURDER MOTIVE REVEALED	Infowars Alex Jones Bombshell - Livestream July 23, 2026	4	July 23, 2026
Heidecker consults pseudonymous World War II-era whistleblower "The Jack-o'-Lantern" (Carmen Christopher), who hides his face behind a mask and suggests hiding his voice behind a New York accent, about Japanese iodine industry heads having orchestrated Jones' death for switching to promoting quinine-based products; through a conversation he had with a Japanese businessman named Takamora that he secretly recorded and sent to InfoWars to be reported on air. The Jack-o'-Lantern instead spends most of his time mentioning what he enjoys about Japan and its culture, including most of Heidecker's time with Kansan caller Phil. He later takes a call from Barack Obama regarding an HBO Max television series about American history from the perspective of Larry David.
Emergency with Tim Heidecker - R.I.P HORACE	InfoWars Super Malaria Emergency - Live Stream July 30, 2026	5	July 30, 2026
A bloodstained and heavily drunk Heidecker arrives shirtless and with a bottle of whiskey and a box containing Lindsey Graham's heart, and announces that Horace's severed head was found between his legs that morning. He receives calls from caller Phil regarding his experience with "Super Malaria" where Johnny Depp assisted in healing him, Mitch McConnell who incoherently announces a Schrödinger's cat-like state between life and death before Osiris places him into an infinite loop of punishment, and Graham Platner who announces his transition into being a "right-wing free speech guy", where he blurts out political buzzwords on Netflix. Heidecker then calls Whataburger worker Amber for an order, verbally harasses her without making his order, and walks out of the set to eat, while still shirtless and drinking his whiskey.
Emergency with Tim Heidecker- TIM GOES TO THE AFTERLIFE	InfoWars Hell - Live Stream August 6, 2026	6 (End of the original run)	August 6, 2026
Heidecker announces that his claims of events preceding the previous episode were a result of a psychotic episode or hallucinations, meaning that Horace is still alive. The source of the blood remains unclear, though he theorizes that it could be from an accident in shaving his genitals. Heidecker invites Hinkleman again to make sure he goes to Hell when he dies, takes a drug reported to cause explosive diarrhea and death intending to chase Jones into Hell to make sure he suffers, and takes calls from Virginian caller Phil Braun who suggests writing a will, and Chesapeake. Throughout his call with both, he eventually reconciles with Chesapeake and dies from defecation. Phil and Chesapeake agree on terms for possession of Horace, where Heidecker's will gives Phil custody of the horse, and Chesapeake is allowed to visit it periodically.
Celebrating the Life of Tim Heidecker	InfoWars Mourns - Live Stream August 13, 2026	7	August 13, 2026
In place of a usual episode in the wake of Heidecker's death from previous week's episode, multiple quizzes related to both versions of InfoWars and leaderboards for memorial scores are held in memoriam.
Emergency with Phil Braun - CANCELED	InfoWars Rebooted - Live Stream August 20, 2026	8	August 20, 2026
Phil Braun takes the lead as host of Emergency following Heidecker's death, where he announces the previously mentioned music piracy website and reads the news. In inheriting Horace and determining his finances and care, he gets a call from Chesapeake to determine them. They eventually agree on a date. He then consults attorney Dwayne Johnson about tort reform. During the discussion with Johnson, Braun takes a call from Eagle Rock caller Martha who complains that the show is boring without Heidecker. Braun is also bored with the discussion, so he lets Johnson go and takes a call from network president Bob Tuna (Bob Odenkirk), who lets him go and announces Emergency's shutdown as a corporate decision.
Emergency Reunion with Tim Heidecker ft. Anna Konkle, Carmen Christopher, Brent Weinbach	N/A (Note: The episode was a premiere, and not part of a stream.)	9 (Epilogue spin-off)	September 10, 2026
Heidecker reunites with various cast members that acted in episodes of Emergency, explaining the fictional narrative behind the show. Several voice-only cast members recorded clips from home expressing their gratitude for the opportunity to work on the show. Later on with his interview with Mia Di Pasquale (Anna Konkle) and Ben Collins (Brent Weinbach), they explain their future plans of working with more comedic internet culture talents in the upcoming weeks, attempting to fully take over the old Infowars website and the app for InfoWars' future. The episode, and the show, ends with Heidecker doing his Jones impression for the last time.

=== One-shot content ===
Besides being the satiric take of the conspiracy theory spewing content creators like the original Infowars, InfoWars also parodies and satirizes various genres of topics related to internet culture in their skits and visual presentations.

Short-form skits debuted on InfoWars Summer
On-demand title	Satire genre	Episode number	Release date
INCREDIBLE Amazon Hack! Get Free Stuff The Easy Way	The "life hacks" genre of content	1	July 7, 2026
A Day In The Life Of A Guy With AI Psychosis	AI psychosis	2	July 12, 2026
Cake Hunt with Griffin Kelly	Food reviews with cakes on focus	3	July 23, 2026 October 9, 2026 (The Quarter Sheets episode with InfoWars HQ) (Note: It also have been released separately on the same day with InfoWars HQ episode as a YouTube short, making it the first ever video with the spinning InfoWars logo screen bug on the top left like a television channel. Albeit censored and currently age restricted from being viewed from the outside of YouTube, it's also the first ever InfoWars content that ventures on adult content.)
Is a bad Jamaican accent proof that a fetus is conscious?	Pro-life op-ed articles	4	August 2, 2026
Still reeling over that Pwn Sauce!!	Restaurant-focused food reviews	5	August 10, 2026
Who are YOU mining Bitcoin for?	Conspiracy theories regarding crypto money	6	August 16, 2026
Warrior Affirmations (Note: Rather than being continued as a short-form video series, Warrior Affirmations is being continued as an image-based post series in the channel's community post tab and social media posts on Instagram, Bluesky, and Facebook.)	Self-confidence boosting content	7	August 18, 2026 August 25, 2026
Daily reminder: Nothing keeps The Truth Pharmacist away!	The general concept of political conspiracy theories without Alex Jones	8	August 23, 2026
Graham Platner: Maine Lining It	Right-wing stand-up comedians	9	October 9, 2026 (With InfoWars HQ) October 12, 2026 (Standalone on-demand release)
Broken Life Simulator: Corporate Life	Dating simulators and simulator games	10	October 9, 2026 (With InfoWars HQ) October 10, 2026 (Standalone on-demand release)
Support our troops!	Inflation on gas prices of the United States of America	11	November 11, 2026
Long-form special presentations debuted in InfoWars Fall
On-demand title	Satire genre	Episode number	Release date
Vic Berger and Ben Craw's Week of Miracles	Televangelism	1	September 17, 2026
The InfoWars Alpha Child System	The societal "alpha and beta male hierarchy" ideology, manosphere	2	September 25, 2026
The Tim Heidecker Podcast	The Joe Rogan Experience-esque long video podcasts (Note: Not to be confused with The Jim Haggerty Show, which also satirizes the right-wing conspiracy focused long video podcast series in around ten minutes per episode.)	3	October 1, 2026
InfoWars HQ ft. Dev Lemons, Graham Platner, Griffin Kelly	The Office-esque mockumentary sitcoms	4	October 9, 2026
The show begins with the various employees at InfoWars' HQ having a meeting about profits and other types of business things, with everyone seeking an occasion to show funny skits to each other. But suddenly, Tony gets a not-so-great news regarding his family and leaves early from the company, kicking off the events to come.
Vic Berger and Ben Craw's Week of Leadership	American politics and presidents	5	November 3, 2026 (Note: This episode has been released as a special of 2026's Senate and House of Congress elections of the United States of America.)

=== InfoWars Nerve Center ===
On-demand title	Livestream/website title	Episode number	Release date
Nerve Center - Ep. 1: Join The Movement (Note: This episode is not available from being viewed outside of YouTube.)	Nerve Center: What If We Could All Be Mark?	1	October 15, 2026
The hosts Morgan Kerrigan and Camden X talk about InfoWars' new secured deal to faithfully adapt the game of chess into a feature-length action movie, a girl taking her own life after having a session of a virtual reality simulation game released by Meta where the players can roleplay as the company's founder Mark Zuckerberg and relive through various points of Zuckerberg's own life, the development of a new kind of vegetables who can feel pain to resemble meat more, and end the episode with the periodical oath titled as the Nerve Center Pledge. (Note: This oath is taken by placing the right hand on one's forehead and saying the following: I am a disciple of InfoWars. The movement lives within me. I will never sue InfoWars. I will speak sweetly of InfoWars in my marital bed. I shan't violate InfoWars' copyright. I will never name InfoWars as an accomplice in a court of law. I will send InfoWars %10 of my Powerball winnings. I learned all of my favourite products through InfoWars. If I do happen to get into a legal dispute with InfoWars, I will settle it out of the court. I could go on, but you get it. My mind is spoken for.)
Nerve Center - Ep 2: Dinosaur Alien Headshot Theory	Nerve Center - Ep 2: What Really Killed The Dinosaurs	2	October 22, 2026
Kerrigan and Camden X talk about China being the first country/external force to recognise InfoWars, with them giving a "very rare digital panda that there's only 10 of them in the whole world" in the shape of a tacky and polygonal looking virtual pet simulator software and how they were able to acquire it from the "zoo arm of the Chinese military". Slowly, the digital panda reveals it's true colors to be little more than a mere guise of a phishing scam operation that captures Kerrigan and Camden's personal information, bank accounts and other types of valuable information with the help of their lack of judging better. Then Camden alone talks with the self-claimed citizen professor of dinosaurology, Arlo Saunders, who claims that aliens have assassinated all types of dinosaurs in the heads with their laser guns instead of the asteroid hitting the Earth and causing the extinction; in order of infiltrating the planet, drinking, and doing each other. At the end of the episode, Kerrigan and Camden suddenly realize that they have been caught up in a string of bad situations; such as their bank account being dried up and Camden's house being used for a warehouse of counterfeit goods without his will, and ask the movement members to take care of the panda in InfoWars' official website in the place of themselves. (Note: In the official website of InfoWars, there's a playable version of the panda shown on screen with all the pop-up windows shown on the episode, albeit the users doesn't really have to put their personal information to proceed in the simulation; entering fake information for privacy concerns also lets users to proceed.)
Can Being A Bitch Cure Cancer? - Nerve Center Ep 3	3	October 30, 2026	
Kerrigan and Camden X reveal that they all at InfoWars have been diagnosed with ADHD with a diagnosis of Dr. Crizafer [sic], talk about things to keep them focused on; with Kerrigan instead treating a live grenade like her own fidget spinner, talk about Dr. Crizafer from the YouTube channel's premiere live chats as a commenter that "diagnoses people by medical lurking" and a test sheet to be filled by the patients. Ultimately, the grenade gets taken out from the stage by a staff member named Joe with Camden's efforts to prevent an explosion from happening, with Kerrigan stating that she doesn't like spinning pens instead. Then, Kerrigan alone talks with the cancer patient Pauline Kovak and self-proclaimed alternative cancer researcher Dr. Kenny Branch about being a huge bitch curing cancer, with the primary claim of bitches not getting cancer at all. Slowly but surely, Kovak's constant bitchiness to stay alive for her family gets Kerrigan passively riled up. Then in the next segment, Kerrigan promotes a spoofed fake product named Fear Plus, which is a psychedelic therapy course book, pills, and a CD filled with scary sounds to be afraid all the time; even to nonexistent things. Then in the next segment, Camden talks about his prediction of the Quiznos bathroom toilet being the new social media that comes after the attention economy based social media services, stating that he's not bothered with ads or posts from people that he doesn't care about; treating the vandalizations on the toilet cabin as posts made by the community. The episode ends with Kerrigan and Camden doing the Watch Stance, to connect organs with the brain more effectively. (Note: This stance is done by squatting, cupping one's hands over their chests, spreading eyelids as far as possible, and wearing Nerve Center Concentration Cone.)
Did We Kill Too Many Horses? - Nerve Center Ep 4	4	November 5, 2026	
Kerrigan and Camden X talk about the updates on InfoWars' movie adaptation of the game of chess, which has been stalling due to too many horses dying during the recording sessions amidst the poor working conditions for the animal labor. As a result, ASPCA activists shut down the movie's recording sessions, causing InfoWars to move the recording from California to Moldova for loosened regulations for animal rights in order to kill more horses. Then, Kerrigan alone talks about her spiritual journey towards the Catholic Christianity that began with her seeing a torture museum that exhibits the methods of torture perpetuated by the Catholic Church during the scholastic era; guesting a self-proclaimed online philosopher named Austin Simon, whom creates theological videos online; with the said videos online making him rise to the fame with claiming that God isn't real by creating the evil, and reverting back to say that only a supreme being like God can create the evil and he was wrong. Then, Kerrigan and Camden X advertise the newly released InfoWars merch, namely the steaks made by the horses that all died during the recording of the chess movie. Then in the next segment, they talk about Camden's newest fourth cat, named Luna, who is said to be in the show and hostile to the other cats, and he tries to calm her down. The episode ends with a puppet named Polo singing about changing clothes daily after watching InfoWars streams in the fashion of a kids song, alongside with Morgan and Camden.
This Stops Them From Stealing Your Thoughts - Nerve Center Ep 5	5	November 12, 2026	
Kerrigan and Camden X talk about a thought protecting helmets, or face-perfect thought shields that are rather crudely made paper mache versions of the wearer's head; in order to protect the wearer's thougths being accessed without their consent by any third party like companies or government with it's creator, Gordon Vespasian. Then Camden alone ventured into a restaurant that no parent could ever navigate through without a QR code scanner through having an interview with the restaurant's CTO, Imogen Overton, with intentions of ostracize them from entering. Then both of Kerrigan and Camden talked about a new method of taking random pills at once to keep one's immunity system active, as a result of Camden's own ideas. Yet, Kerrigan slowly begins to get concerned about his health, as soon as Camden starts hallucinating things like his daughter, Anastasia. The episode also ends with a short that claims to be worth of an entire four years of college knowledge in thirty seconds.
Cowboy Boot AI Swarm Cyberattack - Nerve Center Ep 6	6	November 19, 2026	
The show and InfoWars as a whole has been infected with Camden's LLM agent fleet employed for administrative tasks suddenly going rogue by itself and cyberattacking the company by slowly overtaking the show with the manipulated LLM versions of Kerrigan and Camden X; and Foot Locker stores by launching missiles for each of it's branches due to them refusing to sell boots with aggressively promoting cowboy boots deals. To escape from the near-constant western themed glitching across the show, the real Kerrigan tried to play a clip from a previous episode incorporating a streamer named HolyMistress who prays to God with practices of BDSM and dirty talking in order to make a change with her prayers being more taken seriously, while the InfoWars staff trying to contain the malfunctioning LLM in a sandbox, failing to succeed. At the end of the episode with the manipulated LLM versions of the hosts touting boot deals in a twisted manner, InfoWars and Nerve Center goes under a system reset for two weeks with an antivirus in action.
TBA	TBA	7	November 19, 2026
TBA	TBA	8	December 3, 2026
TBA	TBA	9	December 10, 2026
TBA	TBA	10	December 17, 2026
TBA	TBA	11	December 24, 2026
TBA	TBA	12	

== Staff ==
Name	Show/special presentation episode they appear in	Role
Nick Lutsko	Intros of InfoWars streams	Theme song composer and performer Creator of the InfoWars Elf
Tim Heidecker	Emergency with Tim Heidecker The Tim Heidecker Podcast InfoWars HQ	Creative director of InfoWars Host of the initial episodes of Emergency/Host of The Tim Heidecker Podcast/Creator writer of InfoWars HQ
Mia Di Pasquale	Emergency with Tim Heidecker	Head of programming and development executive of InfoWars
Ben Collins	Emergency with Tim Heidecker Intros of InfoWars streams	CEO of Global Tetrahedron and The Onion, as himself and fictional Global Tetrahedron and The Onion CEO Bryce P. Tetraeder
Vic Berger	Week of Miracles	Co-host of Week of Miracles
Ben Craw	Week of Miracles	Co-host of Week of Miracles
Jay Weingarten	Alpha Child System	Host of Alpha Child System
Sean Coleman	The Tim Heidecker Podcast	Guest speaker
Rajat Suresh	The Tim Heidecker Podcast	Guest speaker
Jeremy Levick	The Tim Heidecker Podcast	Guest speaker
Patti Harrison	InfoWars Nerve Center	Co-host of InfoWars Nerve Center, Morgan Kerrigan
David Brown	InfoWars Nerve Center	Co-host of InfoWars Nerve Center, Camden X
On-camera cast members
Name	Show/special presentation episode they appear in	Role
Brent Weinbach	Emergency with Tim Heidecker	Ben Collins
Anna Konkle	Emergency with Tim Heidecker	Mia Di Pasquale
Brad Holbrook	The Jim Haggerty Show	Jim Haggerty, Today NOW! variant of Jim Haggerty chatbot
Eric Russo's back	Emergency with Tim Heidecker	Alex Jones' body double in the explosion footage
Phil Braun	Emergency with Tim Heidecker Emergency with Phil Braun/The Jim Haggerty Show	Himself as the host of Emergency with Phil Braun Every unspecified Phil on the phone call-ins Neil Riker
Troy Dillinger	Advertisements released by InfoWars Emergency with Tim Heidecker	The retired sheriff and brand spokesman Dominic Banner
Shinya Miyakoshi	Emergency with Tim Heidecker	The Japanese iodine businessman Mr. Takamora
Carmen Christopher	Emergency with Tim Heidecker	The whistleblower "The Jack-o'-Lantern"
Bruce Burns	Emergency with Tim Heidecker	Audiowave expert Stan Bennett
Cindy Jo Hinkleman	Emergency with Tim Heidecker	Herself as a guest demonologist
Bill Jones	Emergency with Tim Heidecker	Forensics expert Lester Reeve
Griffin Kelly	The Cake Hunt with Griffin Kelly	Herself as the host of The Cake Hunt with Griffin Kelly short skit series.
Xochi Mochi	Advertisements released by InfoWars	Drag queen, and the brand spokesman of "gay frogs" plushies
Eric Fiel	InfoWars HQ	Tony
Stephanie Jackson	InfoWars HQ	Suzanne
Jennifer Mather	InfoWars HQ	The secretary of InfoWars HQ
Mark Riefenstahl	InfoWars HQ	Jerry
Yohan Tanaka	InfoWars HQ	Alex
Dev Lemons	InfoWars HQ	Devon from Broken Life Simulator
Voice only cast members
Name	Show/special presentation episode they appear in	Role
Edi Patterson	Emergency with Tim Heidecker, Emergency with Phil Braun	Chesapeake
Tim Robinson	Emergency with Tim Heidecker Advertisements released by InfoWars	Ohioan caller Tim The brand spokesman of "turning piss into gold/gold into piss" scheme
Will Sasso	Emergency with Tim Heidecker	"Not Alex Jones" AJ
Bob Odenkirk	Emergency with Phil Braun	InfoWars' network president Bob Tuna
Anthony Atamanuik	Emergency with Tim Heidecker	Donald Trump and Robert F. Kennedy Jr.
James Adomian	Emergency with Tim Heidecker InfoWars HQ	Mitch McConnell and Graham Platner
Martha Kelly	Emergency with Phil Braun	Californian caller Martha

== Reception ==
=== Alex Jones' reaction ===
Jones has reacted and commented on The Onion's winning bid for taking over everything related to Infowars and its brand on his X account, as seen on CNN:

Are the Connecticut Democrats with The Onion newspaper bought us, they asked, do they outbid? They said, well, it was competitive. So they changed all the bidding rules, made it secret. Two days ago, I had a bad feeling, I told you that. And just like they tried to shut us down back in late May without a court order, they're supposed to have a court order. There's going to be injuctions filed. About to go live out of Harrison's American Journal studio. I don't know what's going to happen. But I'm going to be here until they come in and turn the lights off.

== See also ==
- The Truth vs. Alex Jones, a documentary about the Sandy Hook families and Jones' conspiracy theories that led to their harassment.
- Infowars, the currently inactive source material.
- Knowledge Fight, a comedy podcast series dedicated to debunking Jones and Infowars prior to the former's end of broadcast and the debut of the satiric reboot.
