= Some Things Never Stay the Same =

Studio album by Heidecker & Wood
- Released: December 10, 2013
- Studio: Kingsize North, Los Angeles, California, US
- Genre: Soft rock
- Length: 44:17
- Language: English
- Label: Little Record Company
- Producer: Tim Heidecker; Davin Wood

Heidecker & Wood chronology
Starting from Nowhere (2011)	Some Things Never Stay the Same (2013)

It was similar to the first record where songs had just been collecting. We had this folder of projects. That’s the way it always kind of starts. This one was a little different in that there were these demos I’d make in my garage, and I’d do my best to kind of sketch them out and make them sound decent. Then, they’d get saved, and I’d send them to Davin, and they would just accumulate. It got to a point after like a year of the first record being out, where we said, “Okay, we’ve got a bunch of songs in various stages of completion, so let’s pick the best ten, and start working on them.”

—Tim Heidecker on recording Some Things Never Stay the Same

Some Things Never Stay the Same is the second full-length studio album by American folk rock duo Heidecker & Wood, including comedian Tim Heidecker and singer-songwriter Davin Wood. It has received positive reviews from critics.

== Reception ==
According to the review aggregator Metacritic, Some Things Never Stay the Same received "generally favorable reviews" based on a weighted average score of 69 out of 100 from 9 critic scores. Editors at AllMusic rated this album 3.5 out of 5 stars, with critic Heather Phares writing that "Some Things Never Stay the Same shows the duo has more mileage in its Yacht Rock sendups" than the novelty of 2011 debut Starting from Nowhere, resulting in "a classic second album: it's not as consistent as Starting from Nowhere, but its highlights suggest Heidecker & Wood will deliver even more convincing and subtly funny songs next time". Nick Freed of Consequence of Sound graded this release a C+, stating that there is good material on the release but comparing Heidecker to prankster Andy Kaufman, cautioning listeners to "approach the music with a kind of dubious caution reserved for snake handlers and schizophrenics" and concludes that this is stronger work than their debut. In The Los Angeles Times, Randall Roberts called this genre-mixing collection "eleven songs about the thrill of drugs, the challenges of a life of crime and the dangers of weather patterns, the work resonates for a variety of reasons" and saved his only critique for Aimee Mann's backing vocals.

In Paste, Mark Rozeman scored this release a 7.2 out of 10, stating that Heidecker's vocals "perfectly emulat[e] the vocal stylings of Michael McDonald, Harry Nilsson and Warren Zevon in a way that leans more towards homage than straight-up parody" and "the fervor and appreciation that the two men hold for their influences" raises this music above being only comedy. Adam Finley of PopMatters gave Some Things Never Stay the Same a 4 out of 10, calling it "a mash-up of classic rock styles that too seldom gives the listener a reason to not simply listen to the music that it emulates" that "is intentionally front-loaded with snappier jams while the second half is weighed down by songs that could have used more charm and less fidelity to their source material". Willcoma of Tiny Mix Tapes gave this release a 3.5 out of 5, characterizing it as feeling "like a series of montages for fuzzy, opaque 70s and 80s dramadies one would watch in the throes of a cold while home from school". Under the Radar's Austin Trunick scored this work a 5.5 out of 10 and compared it to Dennis Wilson's Pacific Ocean Blue, with music that is authentic to the yacht rock period and comedy lyrics that are "awkwardly earnest and remarkably mundane" that makes for "surprisingly catchy" songs.

== Track listing ==
All songs written by Tim Heidecker and Davin Wood.

1. "Cocaine" – 3:28
2. "What Else Is New?" – 3:37
3. "Getaway Man" – 2:46
4. "This Is Life" – 3:35
5. "Tell Her I Love Her" – 4:05
6. "Coming Home" – 3:48
7. "Sunday Man" – 5:02
8. "Hurricane" – 4:14
9. "On Our Own" – 4:52
10. "Salvation Street" – 5:38
11. "The Next Ten Years" – 3:12

== Personnel ==
- Tim Heidecker – guitar, keyboards, vocals, recording, production
- Davin Wood – guitar, bass guitar, keyboards, vocals, production
- Ron Baldwin – backing vocals
- Mike Bloom – lead guitar
- Jason Boesel – drums
- David Brennan – tenor saxophone
- Mike Green – drums
- Eric D. Johnson – guitar
- Jordan Kim – design
- Mary Kobayashi-Connole – violin
- Elizabeth Lea – trombone
- Danny T. Levin – euphonium, trumpet
- Aimee Mann – backing vocals
- Maima Obairori – backing vocals
- Taylor Plenn – saxophone
- Pierre de Reeder – bass guitar, audio engineering, mixing
- Clark Reinking – backing vocals
- Zach Robinson – guitar
- Chris Senseney – guitar
- Deborah Sharpe-Taylor – backing vocals
- Lynn Walton – backing vocals
- Nick Weidner – photography

== See also ==
- 2013 in American music
- List of 2013 albums
