= Starting from Nowhere =

Studio album by Heidecker & Wood
- Released: March 15, 2011
- Studio: Sherman Hall, Denver, Colorado, US
- Genre: Folk rock; soft rock
- Length: 55:16
- Language: English
- Label: Little Record Company
- Producer: Tim Heidecker; Davin Wood

Heidecker & Wood chronology
Starting from Nowhere (2011)	Some Things Never Stay the Same (2013)

Starting from Nowhere is the debut studio album by American folk rock duo Heidecker & Wood, including comedian Tim Heidecker and singer-songwriter Davin Wood. It has received mixed reviews from critics.

== Reception ==
Writing for The A. V. Club, Scott Gordon graded this album a B−, stating that "these songs are humorous in the same way unintentionally funny Velveeta-caliber pop tunes are funny" and praised Heidecker's delivery and Wood's musicianship. Editors at AllMusic rated this album 3.5 out of 5 stars, with critic Heather Phares writing "the duo has inspirations that span from Bread, Seals & Crofts, and Crosby, Stills, Nash & Young to Billy Joel, Gerry Rafferty, Steely Dan, and Mike Post" with musicality that "often exceeds their comedy pedigree" resulting in the duo having "skills to pull off this homage in gloriously cheesy detail". At Consequence of Sound, Nick Freed gave Starting from Nowhere a C−, praising Wood for doing "a fantastic job of harnessing the sounds of the mid-to-late 70’s soft rock genre", but expressing befuddlement at Heidecker's lyrics for being unclear if they are earnest or ironic, resulting in an album that is "somewhat obtuse and open".

Editors at Pitchfork scored this release 4.5 out of 10 and critic Matthew Perpetua characterized this music: "Heidecker's deep fascination with tacky 1970s and 80s aesthetics is foregrounded in a set of songs that strive to evoke the sound and feeling of vintage soft rock, but the comedy is dialed down considerably, to the point that many of the tracks barely register as comedy" and recommended that listeners seek out the music that inspired this release instead. Jay of Tiny Mix Tapes rated this release a 3.5 out of 5 also questioning the sincerity of the songs, with the strong talent of Wood leading the duo to "strike a balance among musicianship, songwriting, and humor that can only be compared to Ween" with genuinely enjoyable music.

== Track listing ==
All songs written by Tim Heidecker and Davin Wood.

1. "Cross Country Skiing" – 4:32
2. "Right or Wrong" – 3:41
3. "Grandest Canyon" – 3:27
4. "Wedding Song" – 3:55
5. "Desert Island" – 3:44
6. "Life On the Road" – 5:16
7. "Weatherman" – 5:34
8. "A Song for My Father" – 4:27
9. "Right to the Minute" – 5:29
10. "She Left You" – 3:40
11. "Million People" – 3:39
12. "Christmas Suite" – 7:51

== Personnel ==
- Tim Heidecker – acoustic guitar, electric guitar, fuzz bass, vocals, backing vocals, collage, layout, production
- Davin Wood – acoustic guitar, electric guitar, electric piano, Grand piano, synthesizer, horn arrangements, vocals, backing vocals, production
- Arliss Best – synthesizer
- Jason Boesel – drums
- Don Carter – drums, percussion
- Amy DeMarco – cello
- Thomas A. Fox – trumpet
- Ross Jackson – bass guitar
- Aimee Mann – cover art
- Dell "Easy" McKinney – bass guitar
- The Palo Alto String Ensemble – strings
- Rob Pierce – double bass
- Pierre de Reeder – collage, layout, mixing
- Mike Sheffler – bass guitar
- Mark Visher – saxophone
- Kevin Willis – electric guitar
- Denise Wood – flute

== See also ==
- 2011 in American music
- List of 2011 albums
