= Troy Dillinger =

American actor and musician

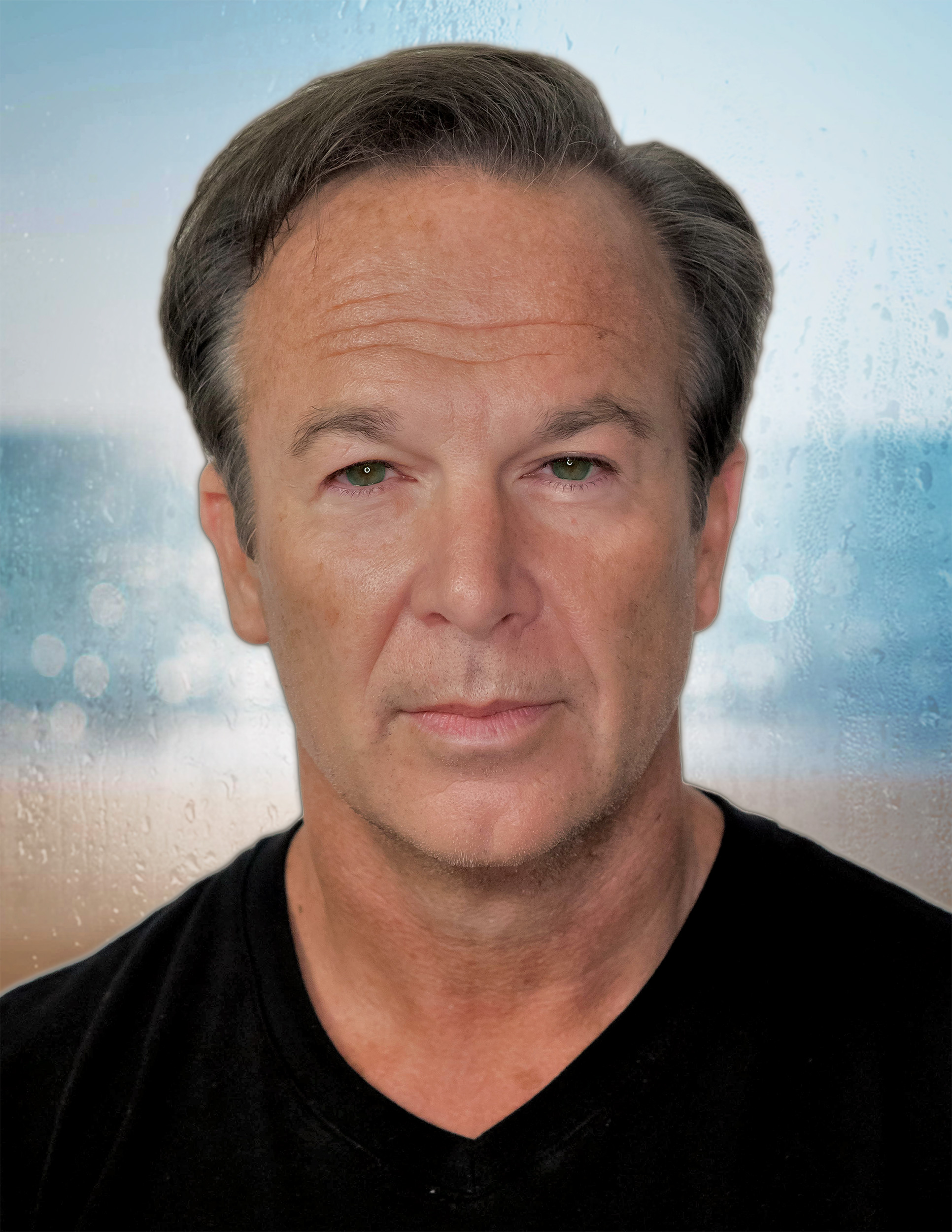

Troy Dillinger (born February 28) is an American musician, comedian, and actor. He is best known for his work as a singer-songwriter in the US and Europe, for founding Save Austin Music, creating [austin swim] and Adult Swim Presents, and creating, producing, writing, and hosting The Austin Variety Show.

== Early life ==
Dillinger was born in Canton, Ohio and grew up in Austin, Texas.

== Career ==
In 1992, Dillinger co-founded rock band the Del Dragons. The band broke up shortly after its first full-length release in 1997 and toured the US and Europe as "Troy Dillinger & Del Dragons" through 1999. In late 1999, Dillinger began performing as Troy Dillinger with a rotating lineup of band members which included Hunt Sales, Ian McLagan, and others.

In 1998, he began acting and landed small roles in movies such as American Outlaws, The New Guy, and Miss Congeniality.

In 2005, he released the award-winning Dirty & Harry CD/DVD full-length recording and film festival, which won awards from the Austin Music Network and The Austin Chronicle. The same year, he created Austin Swim, an Adult Swim viewing party which led to the creation of Adult Swim Presents.

In 2008, Dillinger severed his ties with Adult Swim and created The Austin Variety Show, a local television show which features Austin music, comedy, burlesque, and a live game show with members of the audience. The show aired on KBVO (TV) from 2010 to 2013 before moving to the internet.

In January 2017, Troy moved to Los Angeles, California, where he continued performing as a standup comic, while shopping Austin Variety Show's Game Show component as "LOSER: The Game Show".

Since 2026, Dillinger has regularly been featured on InfoWars, usually as a satirical infomercial pitchman.

== Discography ==
- BAND FROM HELL (1988)
- Lucky 13 (1990)
- Del Dragons (1994)
- Del Dragons - Southern Jumbo (1997)
- Troy Dillinger & Del Dragons - Live In Paris (1999)
- Troy Dillinger - And A Guitar (1999)
- Troy Dillinger - Vivre (2000)
- Dillinger - Live At Antone's (2002)
- Troy Dillinger - Fine So Far (2003)
- Troy Dillinger - Dirty & Harry (2005)
