= Nick Lutsko =

American musical artist and Internet personality (born 1990)

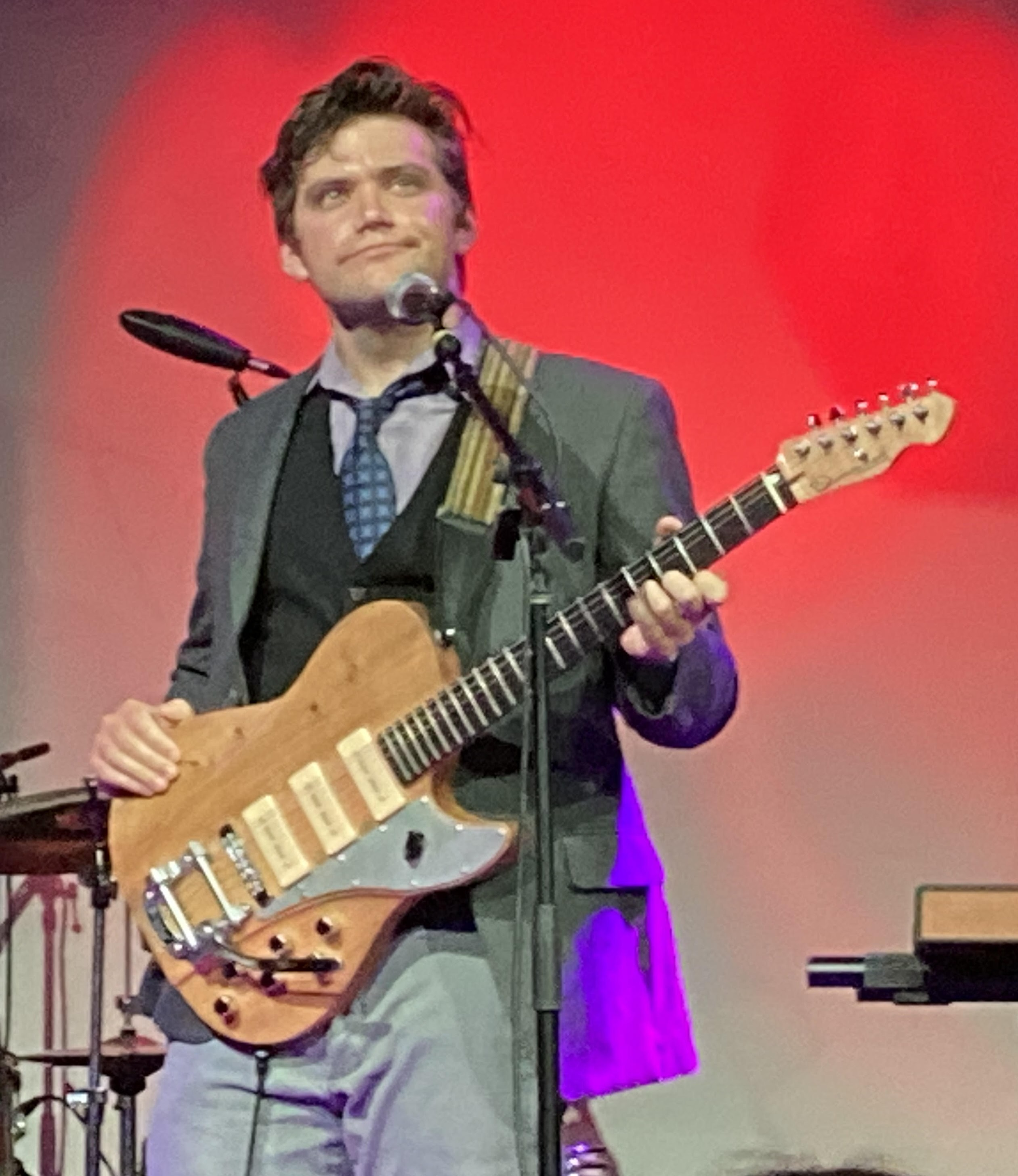
- Nick Lutsko performing at the Bowery Ballroom in New York City on June 29, 2022.

Background information
- Born: November 29, 1990 (age 35); Orlando, Florida, United States
- Genres: Indie rock; Pop
- Occupations: Musician, comedian
- Years active: 2012–present
- Label: Needlejuice
- Website: nicklutsko.com

Nick Lutsko (born November 29, 1990) is an American singer, songwriter, comedian, and multi-instrumentalist best known for his comedic songs and videos released via social media, particularly Twitter and YouTube. Most of the videos feature Lutsko portraying a fictional version of himself, singing directly into the camera about political figures, current events, or pop culture, often with absurdist or surreal tones.

== Biography ==
A long-time resident of Chattanooga, Tennessee and a graduate of Middle Tennessee State University, Lutsko films most of his music videos in and around his Chattanooga home. Lutsko has released several albums, including Swords (2019), a non-comedy album Lutsko worked on for four years. Several of his comedic Internet songs have been compiled into the albums Songs on the Computer (2020) and More Songs on the Computer (2021). Lutsko's videos have garnered millions of views online.

Lutsko has created songs parodying political figures and topics like Donald Trump, Joe Biden, Alex Jones, Donald Trump Jr., Fox News, and Pizzagate. Lutsko often appears sweaty and crazed in his videos, and his songs feature several running jokes and recurring characters, creating what Nerdist writer Michael Walsh called the "Nick Lutsko Expanded Universe". Among these jokes are Lutsko's adoration of conservative commentator Dan Bongino, his ongoing feud with Amazon CEO Jeff Bezos, and his relationship with his grandmother, who lives in a house with a basement Lutsko claims is inhabited by "men in the tunnels".

Lutsko's character repeatedly writes unsolicited theme songs, including for Space Jam: A New Legacy, The Irishman, and the Spirit Halloween retail store chain. The lattermost song inspired Spirit Halloween to solicit two additional songs from Lutsko about the company, which also led to recurring jokes about Lutsko being the "King of Halloween". Lutsko also regularly sings about the Gremlins film franchise, sometimes portraying a human/gremlin hybrid character named Desmond, and attempting to produce a fictional sequel film called Gremlins 3: Dawn of Desmond.

Some of his other commercial work includes writing songs for Netflix, CollegeHumor, Super Deluxe, and Life360. In 2022, he won a Webby Award for Best Original Music for his work with Lord Danger for Old Spice.

Beginning in 2026, Lutsko performed various theme songs for InfoWars under The Onion, introducing the short-lived mascot "InfoWars Elf". His songs tell an ongoing story, beginning with the dismissal of the elf, followed by it introducing a dance craze called the "InfoWars Twist", and then manifesting in the real world and murdering elders in order to claim their teeth.

Lutsko has long performed with his bandmate and bassist Eric "Greezy Rick" Parham, who performs while wearing a Muppet-like mask with brown fur and an elongated nose. He also regularly performs with "Cowboy Jon" Elliot, who plays saxophone and xylophone while wearing cowboy attire.

== Discography ==
=== Studio albums ===
- Heart of Mold (2013)
- Etc. (2015)
- Swords (2019)
- Songs on the Computer (2020)
- More Songs on the Computer (2021)
- HAUNTED (2024)
- Ends (2025)
- Infowars: The Album (2026)

=== Extended plays ===
- Mumbo Jumbo Trash (2012)
- Hell Yup! (2022)
- Seven Inch Swords (2022)
- Incantations (2022)
- SNL: Celebration of Summertime (2023)
- Cruel Experiments (2023)
- CUATRO (2024)

=== Singles ===
- "Grinning Like a Barracuda" (2018)
- "Spineless" (2020)
