= High School (album) =

Studio album by Tim Heidecker
- Released: June 24, 2022
- Genre: Folk rock; folk-pop; pop rock
- Length: 39:51
- Language: English
- Label: Spacebomb Records
- Producer: Drew Erickson; Tim Heidecker; Eric D. Johnson; Mac DeMarco

Tim Heidecker chronology
Fear of Death (2020)	High School (2022)	Live in Boulder (2023)

"This one started feeling like I wanted to make a counterpoint to the Fear of Death record sonically, in terms of not as many bells and whistles. It's not as sonically big or lush or live-sounding, which I think is great. I was like, 'The smart move is to do almost an acoustic record, a small record, like Tunnel of Love or Full Moon Fever or something,' which is almost like a garage record."

—Heidecker on the sound of High School

High School is a 2022 studio album by American comedian and pop rock singer-songwriter Tim Heidecker, released on Spacebomb Records. The album is themed around Heidecker's experiences of adolescence and young adulthood and has received positive reviews from critics.

== Reception ==
Editors at AllMusic rated this album 4 out of 5 stars, with critic Mark Deming writing that "High School is full of bittersweet tales of awkwardness, uncertainty, and poor decisions" and that Heidecker's writing has "parts [that] are quite funny, but most of High School is more than a bit rueful, less a celebration of the glories of youth than scattered memories of parking lot fights neither party wanted to happen, indulging in low-level decadence while wondering about that war on the other side of the world, and the nagging question of whether things are ever going to get better". Andy Crump of No Depression stated that this album "feels like a natural progression of Heidecker's development as an artist, an album shaped around a contrast between vulnerability and buoyancy", reflecting his growing seriousness as a songwriter. In Paste, Brianna Zigler scored this release a 6.5 out of 10, considering it a step down from the more experimental and textured Fear of Death released in 2020, consequently being "less perceptive and less honest". Editors at Pitchfork scored this release 7.5 out of 10 and critic Sam Sodomsky summed up that it "glows with the hard-earned belief that someone, somewhere could hear his story and reach the same epiphany about their own future".

== Track listing ==
All songs written by Tim Heidecker.

1. "Buddy" – 4:19
2. "Chillin' in Alaska" – 4:29
3. "Future Is Uncertain" – 3:59
4. "Get Back Down to Me" – 4:21
5. "I've Been Losing" – 2:55
6. "Punch in the Gut" – 3:22
7. "Stupid Kid" – 5:29
8. "Sirens of Titan" – 3:28
9. "What Did We Do with Our Time" – 4:29
10. "Kern River" – 3:05

== Personnel ==
- Tim Heidecker – guitar, vocals, production
- Greg Calbi – audio mastering at Sterling Sound, Edgewater, New Jersey, United States
- Mac Demarco – bass guitar, guitar, drums, percussion, drum programming, audio engineering, production
- Drew Erickson;– guitar, keyboards, drums
- Eric D. Johnson – guitar, keyboards, percussion, vocals, engineering, production
- Jonathan Rado – piano on "Stupid Kid"
- Travis Robertson – design
- Nathan Vanderpool – mixing at Tiny Pinecone Studio
- Kurt Vile – guitar and vocals on "Sirens of Titan"

== See also ==
- 2022 in American music
- 2022 in rock music
- List of 2022 albums
