= An Evening with Tim Heidecker =

Stand-up comedy special

An Evening with Tim Heidecker is a 2020 stand-up comedy special written and performed by American comedian Tim Heidecker. Released on YouTube on October 23, 2020, the special presents a deliberately awkward and self-aware comedic persona that parodies conventional stand-up tropes. Upon release, it received mixed reviews, with critics noting its precise parody of stand-up conventions while differing on whether its intentionally uneven tone sustained its impact.

== Background ==
Throughout the special, you tease the audience that you’re going to do this totally dangerous comedy that’s going to blow their minds, but the actual danger is when these terrifying aspects of your personal life start coming out. That’s pretty consistent across your work. What appeals to you about playing these self-destructive people?
It’s a fundamentally funny thing for me. On the surface, [he’s] an entirely narcissistic bully, and then you can play off some really sad, pathetic qualities in that person. I’m glad you picked up on that. It’s woven throughout. If you read between the lines of this character, he’s in a really bad place, he’s an alcoholic, he’s got a bad relationship with his wife ... or ex-wife.

— Heidecker on the "Tim Heidecker" stand-up character

An Evening with Tim Heidecker developed out of Heidecker's long-running interest in stand-up comedy as a performance form. Before filming the special, he had been performing and refining the material in live shows for nearly a decade. The character presented in the special was partly inspired by Heidecker's experiences watching comedians struggle onstage, shaping the persona’s exaggerated confidence and confrontational tone.

In interviews, Heidecker has explained that the act deliberately leans into familiar stand-up rhythms and structures, exaggerating them to parody mainstream comedy styles. He has described the character as outwardly confident but inwardly unstable, incorporating references to alcoholism and failed relationships as part of the persona's underlying tension. More broadly, Heidecker has said he is drawn to portraying flawed or inept characters, noting in an interview with Indy Week that failure is "a big component" of his comedy and that he enjoys "showing characters who we see in the world, and laughing at them and making fun of them."

The special was filmed in Los Angeles in 2017 and directed by Ben Berman, a previous collaborator of Heidecker. It was announced on October 15, 2020, with a trailer previewing its format and tone. Rather than debuting through a streaming service, the special premiered independently on YouTube on October 23, 2020.

== Reception ==
Critical response to An Evening with Tim Heidecker was mixed and often centered on its engagement with stand-up comedy conventions. The A.V. Club's Randall Colburn gave the special an A−, praising Heidecker's ability to lampoon traditional stand-up formats and portray the kind of self-important performers he has depicted throughout his career. Ashwin Rodrigues of Vice described the special as a parody of contemporary streaming-era stand-up, writing that it "walks a tightrope" between sincerity and satire and plays with audience expectations shaped by familiar comedy structures.

In its coverage of the release, Vulture characterized the project as consistent with Heidecker's broader comedic approach, in which exaggerated characters are used to explore discomfort and self-delusion.

Other critics were less favorable. Sean L. McCarthy of Decider wrote that the public should skip the special, arguing that "You have to already be fully in on the Tim & Eric experience to even begin to enjoy this... It's an inside non-joke." Brian Logan of The Guardian gave the special two out of five stars, writing that while Heidecker effectively captures the “brittle self-regard” of the character and includes inventive meta-comedy, much of the material relies on groan-inducing puns and autobiographical bits that lack strong punchlines. Logan concluded that the performance ultimately becomes repetitive, limiting its overall impact.
