= Patti Paniccia =

Early Woman Pro Surfer and Co-Founder of Women's Pro Surfing

Patti Paniccia (born 19 Sept 1952) is an American law professor, lawyer, journalist and former professional surfer.

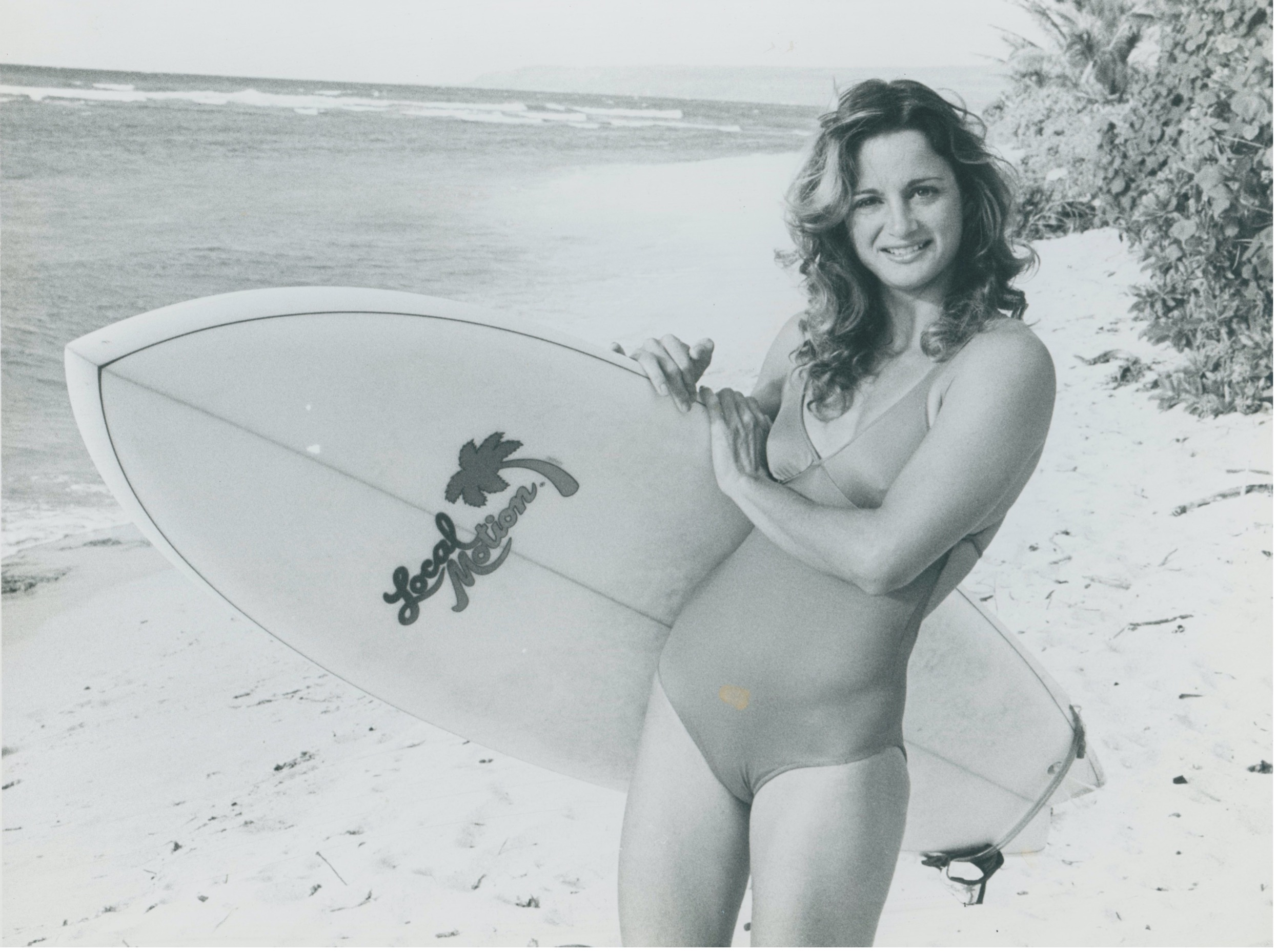
Paniccia in 1979

== Early life and education ==
Born in Glendale, California, Paniccia grew up in Los Angeles and Huntington Beach, as well as in Waialua, Hawai‘i.

She graduated from the University of Hawai'i with a BA in Communication in 1977 and from Pepperdine Law School in 1981.

== Career ==
=== Surfing ===
Paniccia was a co-founder of the Hawai'i Women’s Surfing Hui, a group of women surfers formed in 1974 that sought recognition for female athletes and equality in surfing competitions. As the Hui’s Pro Competition Director, she worked with Fred Hemmings to create an improved rating and invitation system for women and ran the first open qualifying contest for women seeking invitations to pro contests.

Paniccia is a co-founder of professional surfing. In 1976 she joined with Hemmings and Randy Rarick to form International Professional Surfing in order to launch the first world tour. Paniccia was Director of the Women's Division.

She is recognized as one of the early women who professionally surfed Hawaii's big waves. In 1976 she qualified for the first Lancer’s Women’s World Cup held in on the North Shore of Oahu, which was the first women’s event broadcast on a national sports program. She took 7th place. The contest, held January 7, 1976, was broadcast May 9, 1976 on CBS Sports Spectacular.

She was one of six women who competed on the first women’s world pro surfing circuit in 1976, which included six contests in Hawaii, Brazil and South Africa. IPS declined to give official rankings or name a women's world champion until the following year, at which point Paniccia retired from competition to continue working with IPS to expand the women’s tour to include California and Australia.

Working with other women surfers in the Hui, Paniccia helped to create the North Shore Haleiwa Menehune Surf Contest in 1977 for children ages 3–12.

=== Journalism ===
After leaving the pro surfing circuit, Paniccia pursued a career in journalism in 1982. She held reporter and anchor positions at KEYT-ABC Santa Barbara and KCOP-TV in Los Angeles before becoming a network news correspondent at CNN’s Los Angeles Bureau.

After Paniccia became pregnant with her first child while at CNN in 1990, CNN Executive Vice-President Ed Turner criticized her choice to have children and questioned her ability to continue working. Upon the birth of her second child in 1992, Paniccia was fired on the assumption that she would be incapable of maintaining a regular work schedule while caring for two children. A pregnancy discrimination suit she brought against CNN garnered national attention. CNN settled the case two years later. Terms were not disclosed.

=== Legal ===
In 1987 Paniccia began teaching First Amendment law as an adjunct professor at Pepperdine Law School. After her discrimination lawsuit, she instituted two additional classes, Gender and Law and Employment Discrimination Law. She is a frequent commenter on issues of gender discrimination.

In 1997, she created Pepperdine’s Patti Paniccia Law Scholarship, which financially assists students who are raising minor children.

== Awards and recognition ==
In 1988 Paniccia received an Emmy nomination from the Los Angeles Area Academy of Television Arts and Sciences for an investigative series on the Los Angeles justice system's failure to adequately deal with infant abuse.

In 2000 and again in 2018, she was awarded Pepperdine Law School’s David McKibben Excellence in Teaching Award.

In 2005 Paniccia was honored at the kickoff event of the Women's Pro Tour at Waimea Bay, Hawaii. In 2015 she was featured in an exhibit called “Trailblazers in Women’s Surfing” at the Surfing Heritage and Culture Center in San Clemente, California. In 2018 she was invited to give a keynote speech for an exhibit and gala at the Surfing Heritage and Culture Center, "Women Making Waves," in which she addressed past and current discrimination against women surfers.

== Selected books and articles ==
Paniccia, Patti (2000), Work Smarts for Women: The Essential Sex Discrimination Survival Guide. New York: Ballantine ISBN 0345422619

Paniccia, Patti (2002-1-27). “My Cold, Dark Place,” Los Angeles Times Sunday Magazine. Retrieved 2020-12-31 My Cold, Dark Place

Paniccia, Patti (2003-11-16) “In the Name of the Duke,” Los Angeles Times Sunday Magazine In the Name of the Duke Retrieved 2020-12-31. Reprinted 2006-11-1 as “Who Owns the Duke?” Honolulu Magazine. Who Owns the Duke?

Paniccia, Patti (2003 Volume 12 Spring) “Progressions: 70’s Pro Genesis” The Surfers Journal. Progressions Retrieved 2021-1-6

Paniccia, Patti (2004-7-25) “The Devil’s Advocate,” Los Angeles Times Sunday Magazine. The Devil's Advocate Retrieved 2020-1-31.
