= Tim Heidecker =

American comedian and actor (born 1976)

- Tim Heidecker on the set of the EMERGENCY Reunion episode in 2026
- Born: Timothy Richard Heidecker; February 3, 1976 (age 50); Allentown, Pennsylvania, U.S.
- Occupations: Comedian; writer; director; actor; musician
- Years active: 1996–present
- Spouse: Marilyn Porayko (m. 2007)
- Children: 2
- Website: timheidecker.com

Timothy Richard Heidecker (/ˈhaɪdɛkər/; born February 3, 1976) is an American comedian, writer, director, actor, and musician. Along with Eric Wareheim, he is one half of the comedy duo Tim & Eric.

As an actor, Heidecker's filmography includes roles in Bridesmaids (2011), Tim and Eric's Billion Dollar Movie (2012), The Comedy (2012), Ant-Man and the Wasp (2018), and Us (2019). He currently hosts the parodic film review web series On Cinema, with Gregg Turkington, and hosts a weekly call-in show, Office Hours Live with Tim Heidecker, with DJ Douggpound and Vic Berger. In April 2026, Heidecker was announced as creative director of the satirical Infowars reboot by The Onion.

Heidecker is also a singer-songwriter, having released a blend of comedy rock and more earnest folk rock across an eight-album solo discography. His latest album, Slipping Away, was released in 2024.

== Early life and education ==
Heidecker was born in Allentown, Pennsylvania, on February 3, 1976. He attended and graduated from Allentown Central Catholic High School in Allentown, then attended Temple University in Philadelphia, where he met his comedy partner Eric Wareheim.

== Career ==
=== Television ===
Heidecker and Wareheim created, wrote, and starred in Tom Goes to the Mayor, a limited animation series that aired from November 2004 to September 2006 on Adult Swim. Heidecker plays Tom, the protagonist of the show who continually brings his ideas to the Mayor (played by Wareheim) only to have them thwarted in most cases, leaving Tom worse off than when he started. According to their website, Wareheim and Heidecker had mailed copies of an early version of the show to comedian Bob Odenkirk, who agreed to take on the project as the executive producer of the series and sold it to Adult Swim.

The duo's second show, Tim and Eric Awesome Show, Great Job!, premiered in 2007, on Adult Swim. They also created and starred in Tim and Eric's Billion Dollar Movie, and appeared together as debt collectors on the Adult Swim special Young Person's Guide to History and have made guest appearances in the movie Let's Go to Prison, as well as the Scottish video game series VideoGaiden and a Version 2 episode of Mega64. Heidecker also had a small role in the 2011 film Bridesmaids, and a leading role in the 2012 independent drama The Comedy, directed by Rick Alverson and also starring Wareheim. In July 2012, Heidecker starred in an episode of Workaholics. In 2012, he guest starred in Dinosaur Jr.'s music video "Watch the Corners". In the same year, Heidecker made a cameo appearance on the independent movie reviewing site, Red Letter Media. Heidecker appeared in an episode of the RedLetterMedia series, "Half in the Bag." The episode is titled "Season Finale: Step Up Revolution." Within the short sketch comedy, Heidecker plays a VCR repairman named "Tim". Shortly after his introduction into the scene, he flies through the ceiling and makes his exit from the skit.

Heidecker starred in a series of films for Absolut Vodka's website with Wareheim and Zach Galifianakis. In 2010, Heidecker and Wareheim directed a series of Old Spice commercials starring actor Terry Crews. Using characters and skits from Awesome Show, Heidecker and Wareheim (via their Abso Lutely Productions company) created an online-only show called "Tim and Eric Nite Live!," originally broadcast on the website SuperDeluxe.

Since 2012, Heidecker has hosted a parodic web series and podcast called On Cinema, where he and special guest (Gregg Turkington) discuss films from past and present. In 2013, an On Cinema Film Guide app was released, featuring the voices of Heidecker and Turkington reviewing over 17,000 films. Heidecker, Wareheim, Sarah Silverman, Michael Cera, and Reggie Watts announced on the podcast Comedy Bang! Bang! that they were starting a comedy YouTube channel called Jash.

Since 2016, Heidecker has hosted the podcast and web series Office Hours Live along with Vic Berger and Doug Lussenhop. It features phone and video calls with fans, comedians, musicians, and political commentators.

The duo's anthology horror series, Tim and Eric's Bedtime Stories, aired on Adult Swim from 2014 to 2017. A sitcom starring the duo, Beef House, premiered in March 2020.

On October 23, 2020, Heidecker released his first stand-up comedy special, An Evening with Tim Heidecker, on YouTube. Filmed in the style of a typical standup special, Heidecker's special is a parody of the format in which he deliberately plays a hack stand-up comic.

In December 2020, Heidecker and Turkington launched the HEI Network internet platform, independently run, with subscriptions to finance and distribute On Cinema, after all of Adult Swim livestream programs were cancelled.

On April 20, 2026, satirical publication The Onion announced that it would be taking control of the far-right conspiracy outlet Infowars, with Heidecker announced as the new "creative director" of the site, planning to create satirical content under the moniker. Heidecker stated in an interview, "I just thought it would be just a beautiful joke if we could take this pretty toxic, negative, destructive force of Infowars and rebrand it as this beautiful place for our creativity." The Onion announced that a share of merchandise proceeds would be sent to Sandy Hook families. Tim had initially contacted The Onion about collaborating when they previously attempted to acquire Infowars in 2024. The show later featured Heidecker dying, which The Onion presented as fact with memorials and merch, but the death itself was a satirical fabrication.

=== Music ===
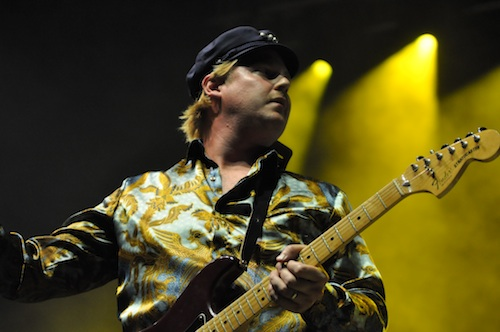
Heidecker performing in Tim & Eric in October 2009

Heidecker played in various indie rock bands in Philadelphia. In 2008, he made an appearance in the Ben Folds and Regina Spektor music video, "You Don't Know Me".

Davin Wood composed the music for Awesome Show, but Heidecker would sometimes sing and write lyrics. Williams Street Records released both Awesome Record, Great Songs! and Uncle Muscles Presents Casey and His Brother in 2008, featuring music from the first two seasons. Wood previously composed the music for Tom Goes to the Mayor, and he and Heidecker form the duo Heidecker & Wood. Inspired by 1970s soft rock, they released their first album, Starting from Nowhere, on March 15, 2011. The duo released a second album in the same style on November 12, 2013, Some Things Never Stay the Same. They cite the influence of Randy Newman, Warren Zevon, Harry Nilsson, and Boz Scaggs.

In 2012, Heidecker contributed a parody campaign jingle for Herman Cain's presidential bid titled "Cain Train". This was the first of nine songs which would eventually become a full album, titled Cainthology: Songs in the Key of Cain. Proceeds from the album's benefited the Violence Intervention Program. The number nine was chosen as the number of songs, and $9.99 the original price, in reference to Herman Cain's 9–9–9 financial plan.

Before the release of Bob Dylan's album Tempest in September 2012, Heidecker released a Dylan pastiche called "Titanic", spoofing the news that the album would feature a 14-minute track about the RMS Titanic. In 2013, he released two more Dylan parodies, "Running Out the Clock", inspired by Dylan's 1983 album Infidels, and "Long Black Dress", a song in the actual style of Dylan's album Tempest. He also collaborated with the indie band The Earth is a Man on a cover of Dylan's "All the Tired Horses."

In 2013, Heidecker released the album Urinal St. Station under the Drag City label with his band, The Yellow River Boys. The lead single, "Hot Piss", was released in June 2013. Vice Magazine named Urinal St. Station as the best album of 2013.

Heidecker and Davin Wood composed and performed the song "Weatherman" which was used in the 2014 film The Age of Reason.

In June 2014, Heidecker and Wareheim released a 12" single, "Jambalaya", as Pusswhip Banggang.

Heidecker's solo album In Glendale was released on May 20, 2016, on Rado Records.

Heidecker released "I Am a Cuck", a parody of Paul Simon's song "I Am a Rock", on August 26, 2016.

He released Too Dumb for Suicide: Tim Heidecker's Trump Songs via Jagjaguwar on November 8, 2017, a year to the date after Trump's presidential victory.

In August 2020, Heidecker announced Fear of Death, a concept album featuring members of Foxygen, the Lemon Twigs, and Weyes Blood, slated for release on September 25 from Spacebomb Records.

Heidecker's sixth album, High School, was released June 24, 2022, on Spacebomb Records followed by a supporting North American tour.

Heidecker appeared on the 2026 "Super Deluxe" version of Box for Buddy, Box for Star by This Is Lorelei, providing a cover of "An Extra Beat for You and Me".

== Personal life ==
In 2006, Heidecker was stabbed twice in the back while defending his neighbor, an elderly woman, from an attack by her son (the stabber) who was high on PCP. Heidecker later said that he was not aware of the stabbings during the confrontation, only noticing the wounds after the attacker was subdued.

Heidecker is married to actress Marilyn Porayko. They live in Glendale, California and have two children: a daughter born in 2013 and a son born in 2016.

Heidecker joined the Democratic Socialists of America in June 2018. He has described himself as both an atheist and an agnostic.

== Filmography ==
=== Film ===
Year	Title	Role	Notes
2001	The Attic Expeditions	Orderly	Film debut
2002	Tom Goes to the Mayor	Tom Peters (voice)	Short film
2003	Tom Goes to the Mayor: The Return	Tom Peters (voice)	Short film
2006	Let's Go to Prison	Wine Taster	
2009	Al's Brain	Brain Stretcher	Short film
2010	Blood into Wine	Tim Heidecker	
2011	Terri	Mr. Flemisch	
2011	Bridesmaids	Dougie	
2012	The Comedy	Swanson	
2012	The Five-Year Engagement	Chef	
2012	Tim and Eric's Billion Dollar Movie	Tim	Also writer, director and producer
2014	A Merry Friggin' Christmas	Dave	
2015	Vacation	Utah Cop	
2015	Fantastic Four	Mr. Richards	
2015	Entertainment	The Celebrity	Co-writer
2016	First Girl I Loved	Mr. Quibodeaux	
2017	Brigsby Bear	Coach Brad	
2017	Kuso	Phil	
2017	Flower	Bob Sherman	
2017	Sundowners	Tom	
2018	Ant-Man and the Wasp	Captain Daniel Gooobler	
2019	Us	Josh Tyler / Tex	
2019	Mister America	Tim Heidecker	Also writer and producer
2021	Some of Our Stallions	Dr. Thrush	
2022	Spin Me Round	Fran	
2022	The People's Joker	Perry White (voice)	Cameo appearance
2023	First Time Female Director	Greggy Thompson	
2024	Y2K	Howard	
2024	Fetus Monster	Derek (voice)	Short film
2024	Pavements	Gerard Cosloy	
2024	Nutcrackers	Deputy Cox	
2025	Atropia	Hayden	
2025	Him	Tom	
2025	Fior Di Latte	Mark	
2025	Prime	Peter	Short film
2026	Full Phil	Chad	
2026	The Comedy Hour	Jimmy	
2027	Lizard Music	TBA	Filming

=== Television ===
Year	Title	Role	Notes
2004	Aqua Teen Hunger Force	Basketball (voice)	Episode: "Hypno-Germ"
2004–06	Tom Goes to the Mayor	Tom Peters (voice)	Also writer, director, and producer
2007	Acceptable TV	Mood Swing Cosby (voice)	Episode: "Kosbees"
2007–10	Tim and Eric Awesome Show, Great Job!	Tim Heidecker / Various roles	Also writer, director, and producer
2008	Young Person's Guide to History	Debt Collector	TV special
2008–10	The Sarah Silverman Program	Frances	2 episodes
2009	Talkshow with Spike Feresten	Jim Heckler	Episode: "Jim Heckler and Derrick Whipple"
2010–11	Funny or Die Presents	Various	Also writer
2010–16	Check It Out! with Dr. Steve Brule	Jan Skylar	Also writer, director, and producer
2011	Jon Benjamin Has a Van	Mosham the Alien Lawyer	Episode: "Stardoor"
2011	The Simpsons	Amus Bruse (voice)	Episode: "The Food Wife"
2011–22	Bob's Burgers	Burt Dellalucci / various (voice)	4 episodes
2012	Workaholics	Reverend Troy	Episode: "The Lord's Force"
2012–16	Comedy Bang! Bang!	Phil Gorsley	2 episodes
2013	Kroll Show	Jason	Episode: "Secret Room"
2013	Eastbound & Down	Gene	8 episodes
2013–14	Drunk History	Max Schmeling / Cop	2 episodes
2013–17	Tim & Eric's Bedtime Stories	Various	Also writer, director, and producer
2014	Community	Male Four #1	Episode: "App Development and Condiments"
2014	The Birthday Boys	Mill Owner	Episode: "Plight of the Working Class"
2015	Man Seeking Woman	Bartender	Episode: "Pitbull"
2015	Another Period	Hal Carnegie	Episode: "Funeral"
2015	W/ Bob & David	—N/a	Executive producer
2016	Fresh Off the Boat	Mr. Jenkins	Episode: "Phil's Phaves"
2016–17	Decker	Jack Decker/Various	Also writer and producer
2017	Jeff & Some Aliens	Bruce Starr (voice)	Episode: "Jeff & Some Confidence"
2017	Portlandia	Ant Guy	Episode: "Ants"
2017	Clarence	Tim / Teddy / Damien Dawson (voice)	Episode: "Rock Show"
2017	Animals	Stan (voice)	Episode: "Rats"
2018	Pickle and Peanut	Zip / additional voices	Episode: "Black Light Bowling/90's Adventure Bear And The Coconut Helmet"
2019	A.P. Bio	Greg Miller/Bouvier	Episode: "Personal Everest"
2019	Black Monday	Not Milken #1	Episode: "243"
2019–23	I Think You Should Leave with Tim Robinson	Various	3 episodes
2019–23	Crank Yankers	Brad	3 episodes
2020	Beef House	Tim	Also writer and producer
2020	Wild Life	Doug (voice)	Episode: "Doug the Bear"
2020	Moonbase 8	Professor Scott "Rook" Sloan	Writer; Producer
2021	Ultra City Smiths	Mayor Kevin De Maximum (voice)	5 episodes
2021	Just Beyond	Dale	Episode: "Parents Are From Mars, Kids Are From Venus"
2022	Our Flag Means Death	Doug	Episode: "Wherever You Go, There You Are"
2022–23	Killing It	Rodney Lamonca	10 episodes
2023	Fired on Mars	Darren Young (voice)	Main role
2023	Miracle Workers	Stephen	Episode: "Olympus"
2023	Solar Opposites	Garth (voice)	Episode: "The Mobile AISHA Emitter"
2023	Teenage Euthanasia	Edu-Mart Announcer (voice)	Episode: "Sexually Educated"
2023	Carol & the End of the World	Guest Performer (voice)	5 episodes
2024	What We Do in the Shadows	Jordan	Recurring
2025	Small Town, Big Story	Brad	5 episodes
2025	Kiff	Rodney, Humphrey, Baby New Year	3 episodes
2026	Strip Law	Lincoln Gumb Actor	Episode: "We Need to Talk About Heaven"
2026	Robot Chicken	Tim Heidecker (voice)	Television special: "The Robot Chicken Adult Swim Special"

=== Web media ===
Year	Title	Role	Notes
2005	House of Cosbys	Mood Swing Cosby (voice)	Episode: "Episode 2"
2006	Mega64	Mega64 Ragtime Jug Brother	Episode: "Stranger"
2007	Clark and Michael	Self-Defense Instructor	
2007–08	Tim and Eric Nite Live!	Tim Heidecker	Also co-creator and co-writer
2012–present	On Cinema at the Cinema	Tim Heidecker	Also writer, director, and producer
2012	Half in the Bag	Himself	
2013	Tim & Eric's Go Pro Show	Tim Heidecker	Also writer and director, and producer
2013	Tim's Kitchen Tips	Tim Heidecker	
2013	Dr. Wareheim	Tim Heidecker	Also writer and director
2014–15	Decker	Agent Jack Decker	Also writer
2026–present	InfoWars	Tim Heidecker	Also creative director

=== Podcasts ===
Year	Title	Role	Notes
2006	Tim and Eric: The Podcast	Various	Also co-writer, co-director, and producer
2011–13	On Cinema	Tim Heidecker	Also writer and producer
2011–19	Comedy Bang! Bang!	Himself, Elton John, George Burns, Nick Nolte	15 episodes
2013	How Did This Get Made?	Himself (guest)	Guest commenter for The Odd Life of Timothy Green (Episode 54)
2016–22	Chapo Trap House	Himself (guest)	4 episodes: 79, 150, 357, 629
2016–present	Office Hours Live with Tim Heidecker	Himself (host)	Co-hosted with DJ Douggpound and Vic Berger
2018	H3 Podcast	Himself (guest)	Episode 82
2019	Hollywood Handbook	Himself (guest)	Episode 284: "Tim Heidecker, Our Close Friend"
2019	This Is Branchburg	Producer	8 episodes
2020	QAnon Anonymous	Himself (guest)	Episode 100: Mr. Nobody feat Tim Heidecker
2023	Therapy Gecko	Himself (guest)	Episode: "TIM HEIDECKER GIVES ADVICE AS A GECKO"
2023	Cheapshow	Himself (guest)	Episode 359: Stars Over 45
2024	Joy Tactics	Himself (guest)	The Notion of Tim Heidecker
2024	The Matan Show	Himself (guest)	Tim Heidecker Freaks Out And Leaves After Matan Threatens Him
2025	Doomscroll	Himself (guest)	Tim Heidecker: Irony, Comedy and the Internet

=== Applications ===
Year	Title	Role	Notes
2015	On Cinema Film Guide	Tim Heidecker	Also writer

== Discography ==
=== Solo ===
Studio albums

- 2011: Cainthology: Songs in the Key of Cain
- 2012: Titanic and Other Songs
- 2016: In Glendale
- 2017: Too Dumb for Suicide
- 2019: What the Brokenhearted Do...
- 2020: Fear of Death
- 2022: High School
- 2024: Slipping Away

Compilation albums

- 2018: Another Year in Hell: Collected Songs from 2018

Live albums

- 2023: Live in Boulder

=== The Tim Heidecker Masterpiece ===
- 2000: Working Vacation (EP)
- 2002: Theatre of Magic (rock opera)

=== Tim & Eric ===
- 2008: Awesome Record, Great Songs! Volume One
- 2008: Uncle Muscles Presents Casey and His Brother (as Casey and His Brother)
- 2014: Jambalaya (12" single, as Pusswhip Banggang)

=== Heidecker & Wood ===
- 2011: Starting from Nowhere
- 2013: Some Things Never Stay the Same

=== The Yellow River Boys ===
- 2013: Urinal St. Station
- 2021: Greatest Hits

== Bibliography ==
- (2010) Bicycle Built for Two (with Gregg Turkington)
- (2015) Tim and Eric's Zone Theory (with Eric Wareheim)
- (2019) Brendan Kearney's Official On Cinema at the Cinema Reader Volume 1 : 2010–2018 (with Gregg Turkington and Brendan Kearney)

== Stand-up special ==
- 2020: An Evening with Tim Heidecker

== Awards and honors ==
- Webby Award for best actor as part of the comedy team of Tim and Eric
- Directors Guild of America Awards nomination for "Outstanding Directorial Achievement in Commercials" for CeraVe's "Michael CeraVe" (shared with Eric Wareheim)
