= In Glendale =

Studio album by Tim Heidecker
- Released: May 20, 2016
- Label: Rado Records

In Glendale is the second solo album by American comedian Tim Heidecker, released on May 20, 2016. The album is not a parody like his usual absurdist comedy and garnered some positive reviews.

Professional ratings
Aggregate scores
Source	Rating
Metacritic	72/100
Review scores
Source	Rating
AllMusic	3.5/5 stars
Consequence of Sound	B
Pitchfork	6.5/10

== Track listing ==
In Glendale track listing
No.	Title	Length
1.	"In Glendale"	4:15
2.	"Cleaning Up the Dog Shit"	2:55
3.	"Work from Home"	3:41
4.	"Ghost in My Bed"	1:35
5.	"Good Looking Babies"	4:30
6.	"When the Cash Runs Out"	1:25
7.	"I Dare You to Watch Me Sleep"	3:07
8.	"Central Air"	3:37
9.	"I Saw Nicolas Cage"	3:35
10.	"Ocean's Too Cold"	3:05
Total length:		31:45

== Personnel ==
Main personnel

- Tim Heidecker
- Jonathan Rado
