= This House Has People in It =

2016 short film by Alan Resnick

- Genre: Found footage horror Analog horror Psychological horror Supernatural horror Horror-comedy; Surreal horror
- Written by: Alan Resnick; Robby Rackleff; Dina Kelberman
- Directed by: Alan Resnick
- Starring: Naomi Kline; Robby Rackleff; Rory Ogden; Jackson Manning; Sharyn Kmieciak; Ben O'Brien
- Country of origin: United States
- Original language: English

Production
- Executive producers: Dave Hughes; Robby Rackleff; Alan Resnick; Ben O'Brien; Dina Kelberman
- Producer: Cricket Arrison
- Cinematography: Alan Resnick; James Trevor
- Editors: Alan Resnick; Robby Rackleff; Ben O'Brien
- Running time: 11 minutes
- Production companies: Williams Street; AB Video Solutions

Original release
- Network: Adult Swim
- Release: March 15, 2016

This House Has People in It is a 2016 American found footage analog horror short film directed by Alan Resnick and produced by his production company, AB Video Solutions, with Williams Street. It premiered as part of Adult Swim's Infomercials series on March 15, 2016. Framed as surveillance footage inside a suburban home, the 11-minute special follows parents Ann and Tom as they attempt to save their daughter Madison, who is sinking through the floor, while their son Jackson's birthday party takes place outside.

It was written by, produced by, and starred members of the Baltimore comedy collective Wham City, including Resnick, Robby Rackleff, Dina Kelberman, Ben O'Brien, and Cricket Arrison. A link at the end of the film led viewers to an alternate reality game (ARG) surrounding the film and created by Kelberman. The film received critical acclaim, particularly for its unsettling tone and its transmedia component.

== Plot ==
A suburban family is viewed through security cameras placed throughout their home and monitored by a company called AB Surveillance Solutions on the day of their son, Jackson's ("Subject 4"), birthday party. The film is presented as found footage. Parents Ann ("Subject 1") and Tom ("Subject 2"), who is holding their baby, discuss their family vacation and argue in the kitchen about the defiance of their teenage daughter, Madison ("Subject 3"), as she lies prone on the floor behind them. As Jackson and his grandmother ("Subject 5") sit in the living room and watch TV, another man, Dennis ("Subject 6"), does handiwork in the basement beneath the kitchen.

After trying to get Madison off of the floor, Tom realizes she is stuck and not moving, and neither he nor Ann know why. The two frantically and unsuccessfully try to pry her off of the floor as guests arrive for Jackson's birthday party. Jackson arrives in the kitchen and Tom asks him through tears to keep his party guests outside. Madison starts to sink into the floor and through the basement ceiling. Jackson's birthday party guests gather in the front yard without him. Dennis, after seeing Madison in the kitchen, runs back down to the basement with Ann and tries to push her up using a wooden plank. He soon goes back upstairs and starts to cut around her with a saw.

Tom hands the baby to the grandmother, who places her on the floor and continues to watch TV as the baby crawls away. He goes to the basement and manically rants to Ann, then to himself, about their bond as a family being tested. Smoke begins to pour out of the oven and fill the house. In the front yard, children open Jackson's birthday presents and start to destroy them. Ann and Dennis grab the mattress from Jackson's bed and bring it to the basement, placing it under Madison to catch her. Immediately after she falls into the mattress, the video feed cuts out as the words "Out of range" flash on the screen; the audio remains uninterrupted, and Tom and Ann begin to shout and then scream in apparent terror. When the video feed resumes, the mattress Madison supposedly fell onto is vacant and the children in the front yard are all shown lying prone on the ground. Tom and Ann continue to scream until both the video and audio feeds cut out. "Out of range" appears again and remains onscreen, followed by the credits and a link for AB Surveillance Solutions' website.

== Cast ==
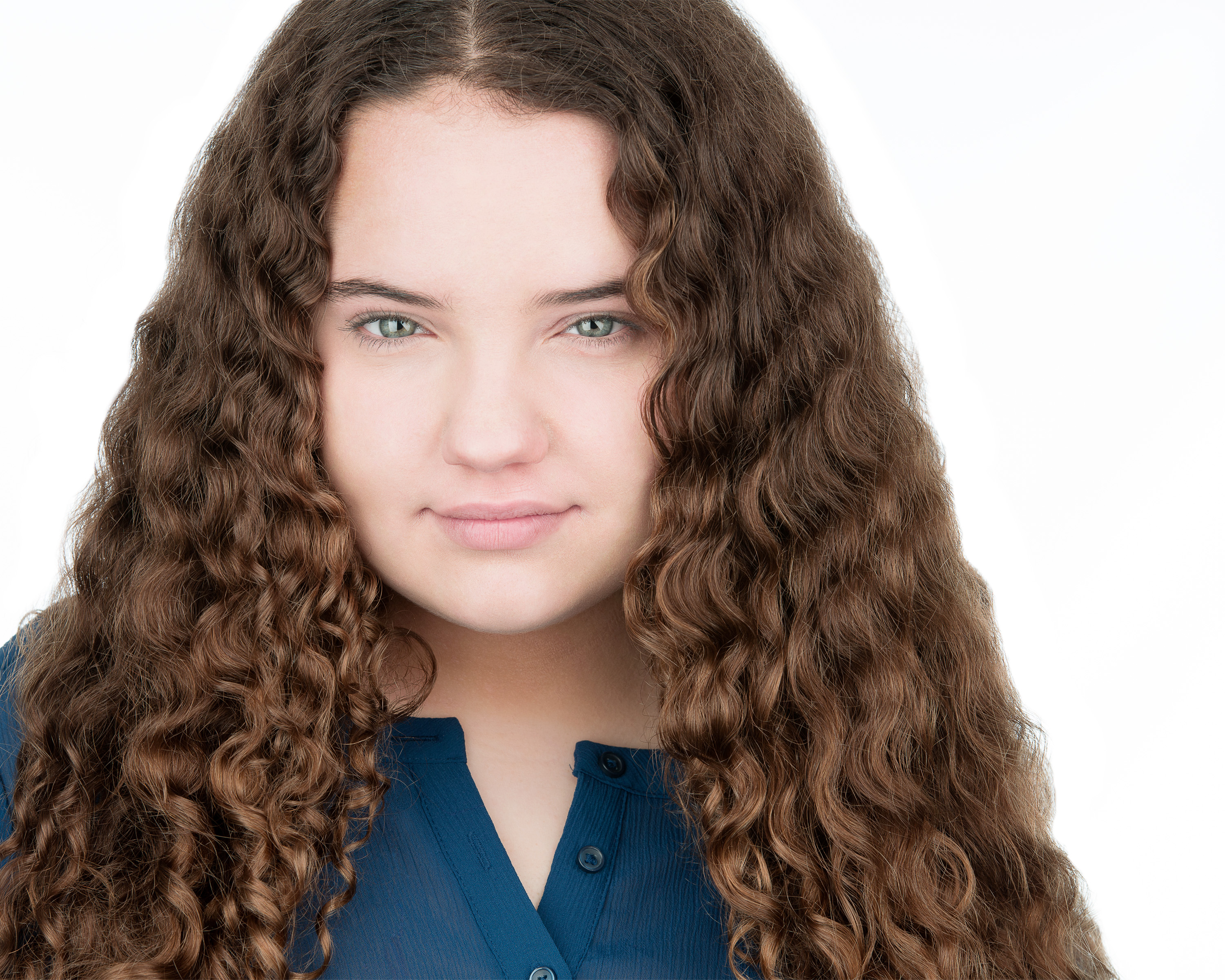
Rory Ogden (pictured) stars as teenager Madison.

- Naomi Kline as Ann / Subject 1
- Robby Rackleff as Tom / Subject 2
- Rory Ogden as Madison / Subject 3
- Jackson Manning as Jackson / Subject 4
- Sharyn Kmieciak as Grandma / Subject 5
- Ben O'Brien as Dennis / Subject 6
- Violet Stack as Baby
- Stephanie Barber as Guest 1
- Evelyn Bachman as Guest 2
- James Bachman as Guest 3
- Adam Bachman as Guest 4
- Dakota Sullivan as Guest 5
- Jeri Forman as Guest 6
- Anderson Brexler as Guest 7
- Jo Keller as Guest 8
- Ben Keller as Guest 9
- Max Keller as Guest 10
- Alan Resnick as TV Man / The Sculptor
- Cricket Arrison as Family Friend

== Production and release ==
Comedian and artist Alan Resnick, who wrote and directed This House Has People in It, originally rose to prominence with his YouTube channel "alantutorial", which Vice described as a "creepypasta-meets-series" and which posted videos from 2011 to 2014. This House Has People in It was produced by AB Video Solutions, his production company, with Ben O'Brien, Dina Kelberman, Robby Rackleff, and Cricket Arrison, all members of the Baltimore-based comedy collective Wham City. It is a follow-up to their short horror film Unedited Footage of a Bear, which premiered on Adult Swim as part of their Infomercials series.

This House Has People in It was first conceived of by Rackleff as being about a cult living in a compound, wherein they would be filmed "like a '90s WB show", whereas the tone would become "grainier", "grimier", and "threatening" whenever they left the compound to go outside, which would be filmed with a different camera. Resnick and Kelberman then came up with the idea of surveillance footage of a suburban family arguing playing without context during a TV broadcast. Rackleff has stated that he was inspired by the found footage horror of The Blair Witch Project, while Resnick said that the "unsettling" nature of poor quality video that he observed when he began learning to use video cameras was influential on the film's techniques.

This House Has People in It was initially intended to be a series, with each episode having a different tone or genre, but ended up as a short film. It was filmed with security cameras placed throughout different rooms and monitored by Resnick, as well as a pan–tilt–zoom camera that he controlled with a joystick. Early scripts, according to Rackleff, revolved around the idea of "adulthood as pain", with the events of the film turning the parents into "exaggerated personifications" of their pain. Other themes in the film include mental illness and family as "a natural form of surveillance".

This House Has People in It premiered on Adult Swim at 4 a.m. EST on March 15, 2016, as one of their Infomercials, and was also uploaded to YouTube.

=== Alternate reality game ===
The link at the end of the film, absurveillancesolutions.com, led to an alternate reality game (ARG) created by Kelberman, who designed the website and, according to Resnick, wanted "to make something so convoluted that only the most dedicated person will fully understand it". Logging into the website using an account number shown at the beginning of the film, 00437, and the password "bedsheets", which is shown on the kitchen fridge in the film, would lead to a "security log" about the family containing audio files, text files, videos, images, and hidden links found through clues hidden within the short film. Additional content of the ARG is also available on YouTube, with a supposed episode of The Sculptor’s Clayground, a pottery show often watched by Grandma/Subject 5.

A subreddit was created to catalogue discoveries within the ARG, which contains other fictional media and topics, including a series called The Sculptor's Clayground, a blue cartoon mascot named Boomy the Cat, and a mysterious disease called Lynks, all of which are referenced within the film itself. YouTuber Night Mind also uploaded a video compiling all of the discoveries from the ARG. Kelberman stated that there were so many details within the ARG that "I don't think any of us know about all of them".

== Critical reception ==
Vice described This House Has People in It as "bizarrely horrifying" and "part Too Many Cooks, part Paranormal Activity, and wholly fucking weird". D. J. Pangburn of the same publication wrote that "the fun in experiencing [This House Has People in It] is to be found in exploring the various strands of media that comprise it". Fast Company's Joe Berkowitz wrote soon after its release that This House Has People in It was "another win for Adult Swim's anything-goes 4 a.m. time slot", calling it "chilling" with "a bizarre premise" that the film "challenge[d] viewers to make sense of". Ellie Houghtaling of Mashable included This House Has People in It on a 2019 list of "the best disturbing, unsettling, spooky shorts from the past few years", writing that it was "a definition project about cryptids" that got creepier "the further you look into it". Bloody Disgusting's Wesley Lara wrote in 2020 that the film being depicted as security camera footage "escalat[ed] the disturbing nature of what happens to a higher degree" and that it was "one of the most notorious [Infomercials] segments".

In 2022, Collider listed This House Has People In It as one of the best analog horror series on YouTube, with Samantha Graves writing that it contained "a lot of 'blink and you'll miss it' horror aspects" and "creepy moments" and describing it as "unsettling". Lex Briscuso /Film praised This House Has People In It in 2023 as an "analog horror nightmare" and "Adult Swim's defining gem" for its unique concept, specific story, production design, worldbuilding, the "brilliant and wacky" performances of the cast—particularly that of Rackleff, who Briscuso wrote had a "fierce intensity" that "forces the audience to become intimately familiar with the terror this family is facing"—and Resnick's "singularly strange sense of humor". For Little White Lies in 2024, Sam Moore wrote that the film "captures a very specific online anxiety: what it means to be constantly seen, whether you want to be or not" and compared Madison falling into the floor to a glitch and "that strange sensation of falling off the edge of the map". Also in 2024, for Bloody Disgusting, Luiz H. C. wrote that This House Has People in It was a "transmedia oddity" with an "abundance of supplemental material".
