= Infomercials (TV specials) =

Quarter-hour television comedy specials airing on Adult Swim

- Genre: Parody; satire; comedy; black comedy; horror; comedy horror; anthology
- Starring: Various
- Country of origin: United States
- Original language: English

Production
- Executive producers: Keith Crofford (Note: Keith Crofford serves as Executive Producer for Williams Street on all infomercials.); Mike Lazzo (Note: Mike Lazzo and Walter Newman serve as Executive Producers for Williams Street on select infomercials individually alongside Crofford.); Walter Newman
- Producers: Melissa Warrenburg (Note: Melissa Warrenburg serves as Producer for Williams Street on live action infomercials from 2016 and prior, as well as Final Deployment 4: Queen Battle Walkthrough in 2018 and When Panties Fly in 2019.); Ollie Green (Note: Ollie Green serves as Producer for Williams Street on animated infomercials and on M.O.P.Z.); Mark Costa (Note: Mark Costa serves as Producer for Williams Street on live action infomercials after 2016.); Paige Boudreaux (Note: Paige Boudreaux serves as Producer for Williams Street on action infomercials after 2018.)
- Camera setup: Single camera
- Running time: 5–22 minutes (15-30 min. with commercials); 91 minutes (Adult Swim Yule Log); 87 minutes (Adult Swim Yule Log 2: Branchin' Out)
- Production company: Williams Street

Original release
- Network: Adult Swim
- Release: November 3, 2009 – present

Infomercials is an umbrella title for independent, quarter-hour television comedy specials airing on Adult Swim. Unlike actual paid programming, all of the programs are fictitious, and for the most part maintain no continuity with each other.

Most of the specials closely resemble and lampoon the format of infomercials, while others parody tropes in niche media such as closed-circuit hotel information channels, industrial films, sitcoms, outdated reality television formats, and public-access television. A number of the titles have a purposeful standard definition look and framing, to match a dated aesthetic. The specials typically air at 4 a.m. ET/PT.

There is no title card or common identifier for the specials, and on some program guide listings, it can be confused with an actual segment of paid programming; if there is a description, it is sometimes blank, with no season or episode numbers. Every title has a different look, as outside of the Williams Street production logos, there are no common directors, cast or crew between the specials, though some directors have returned.

One in particular, Too Many Cooks, is notable for gathering media interest in November 2014. It contains a long-form introduction sequence common to 1980s and 1990s TV shows, except with a seemingly endless cast that continues to be introduced for 11 minutes straight.

One infomercial, Joe Pera Talks You to Sleep, later led to the regular Adult Swim show, Joe Pera Talks with You.

== Specials ==
All the titles are or have been aired under the homonym banner, according to the Adult Swim schedule.

| No. | Title | Created by / Developed by | Written by | Directed by | Co-production(s) | Original air date |
|---|---|---|---|---|---|---|
| 1 | Icelandic UltraBlue | H. Jon Benjamin and David Cross | | Jeff Buchanan | — | November 3, 2009 |
| 2 | Dangerously Delicious: Paid Advertisement | Aziz Ansari (original stand-up comedy film) (d): Aziz Ansari, Jason Woliner, and Eric Wareheim | Aziz Ansari, Jason Woliner, and Eric Wareheim | Eric Wareheim | Abso Lutely Productions; Grandpa Pictures | July 23, 2012 |
| 3 | The NTSF:SD:SUV:HISS Infomercial (Note: These three Infomercials are the only ones to be related to TV series.) | Paul Scheer | Alex Fernie and Nick Wiger | Alex Fernie | 2nd Man On The Moon; Abominable Pictures | November 9, 2012 |
| 4 | Swords, Knives, Very Sharp Objects and Cutlery | Paul Scheer | Rob Huebel | Eric Appel | 2nd Man On The Moon; Abominable Pictures | November 27, 2012 |
| 5 | Broomshakalaka | Justin Becker, Steve Clemmons, and Becca Kinskey | Justin Becker and Steve Clemmons | Daniel Kwan and Daniel Scheinert | Abominable Pictures | December 10, 2013 |
| 6 | For-Profit Online University | Wild, Aggressive Dog | (s): Geoff Haggerty, Dan E. Klein, Matthew Klinman, Michael Pielocik, Chris Sartinsky, and Sam West (t): Sam West | Sam West | Abominable Pictures; Wild, Aggressive Dog (uncredited) | December 17, 2013 |
| 7 | Live Forever as You Are Now with Alan Resnick | Ben O'Brien and Alan Resnick | Alan Resnick and Dina Kelberman | Ben O'Brien and Alan Resnick | AB Video Solutions, LLC | December 24, 2013 |
| 8 | Fartcopter (Note: These Infomercials also serve as pilot episodes for Adult Swim.) | Rob Huebel | | Alex Fernie | Abominable Pictures | October 6, 2014 |
| 9 | The Salad Mixxxer | Chris Amick, Ben Mekler, and David Soldinger | | Ken Marino and David Soldinger | Abominable Pictures | October 13, 2014 |
| 10 | Alpha Chow (Note: These two Infomercials are the only eighth-hour ones of the project, and are always scheduled as one program listed in TV guides as "Alpha Chow & Goth Fitness". No commercial break is aired between it.) | Justin Becker, Steve Clemmons, and Becca Kinskey | Justin Becker and Steve Clemmons | Dave Green | Abominable Pictures | October 20, 2014 |
| 11 | Goth Fitness | Chris Amick, Ben Mekler, and David Soldinger | | Danny Jelinek | Abominable Pictures | October 20, 2014 |
| 12 | Too Many Cooks | Casper Kelly | | | Awesome Inc. | October 28, 2014 |
| 13 | The Newbridge Tourism Board Presents: "We're Newbridge, We're Comin' to Get Ya!" | Tom Scharpling and Jon Wurster | | Tom Scharpling | Production Company Productions | November 3, 2014 |
| 14 | In Search of Miracle Man | Matt Besser and Rich Fulcher | | Neil Mahoney | Abominable Pictures | November 10, 2014 |
| 15 | Smart Pipe | Wild, Aggressive Dog | (s): Geoff Haggerty, Dan E. Klein, Matthew Klinman, Micheal Pielocik, Chris Sartinsky, and Sam West (t): Micheal Pielocik (in Smart Pipe); Chris Sartinsky (in Book of Christ) | Zachary Johnson and Jeffrey Max | Abominable Pictures; Wild, Aggressive Dog | November 17, 2014 |
| 16 | Book of Christ | Wild, Aggressive Dog | (s): Geoff Haggerty, Dan E. Klein, Matthew Klinman, Micheal Pielocik, Chris Sartinsky, and Sam West (t): Micheal Pielocik (in Smart Pipe); Chris Sartinsky (in Book of Christ) | Zachary Johnson and Jeffrey Max | Abominable Pictures; Wild, Aggressive Dog | November 24, 2014 |
| 17 | Frank Pierre Presents: "The Frank Pierre Resort & Casino" | Paul Scheer | | Matthew Freund | Abominable Pictures; 2nd Man On The Moon | December 2, 2014 |
| 18 | Unedited Footage of a Bear | Ben O'Brien (concept) | Alan Resnick, Robby Rackleff, and Dina Kelberman | Alan Resnick and Ben O'Brien | Wham City | December 16, 2014 |
| 19 | This House Has People in It | Alan Resnick (concept) | Alan Resnick, Robby Rackleff, and Dina Kelberman | Alan Resnick | Wham City | March 15, 2016 |
| 20 | Joe Pera Talks You to Sleep (Note: These three Infomercials are the only animated ones of the project.) (Note: In 2019, the Adult Swim's official YouTube channel posted a version of this special repeated for 10 hours.) | Joe Pera; (d): Kieran O'Hare | Joe Pera | Kieran O'Hare | Chestnut Walnut Unlimited | March 21, 2016 |
| 21 | Big Grams: "Born to Shine" / "Run for Your Life" (Note: Only music video Infomercial of the entire project.) | Antwan Patton, Sarah Barthel, and Josh Carter (original EP) (d): Erik Minkin | Sarah Barthel, Antwan Patton, and Jim Petosa | Awesome Inc. | Awesome Inc. | March 28, 2016 |
| 22 | M.O.P.Z. | Todd Rohal and Benjamin Kasulke | | Todd Rohal | Mechanical Dreams; PFFR | April 4, 2016 |
| 23 | Gigglefudge, USA | Nicholas Maier and Dimitri Simakis | | John Lee | PFFR; Everything Is Terrible! FishBowl Worldwide Media | April 11, 2016 |
| 24 | Giles Vanderhoot | Michael Showalter | Michael Showalter and Jonathan Stern | Michael Showalter | Abominable Pictures | April 25, 2016 |
| 25 | Live at the Necropolis: The Lords of Synth | Nick Corirossi, Scott Gairdner, Charles Ingram, Danny Jelinek, and Ryan Perez | Scott Gairdner and Ryan Perez | Nick Corirossi and Charles Ingram | Abominable Pictures | May 2, 2016 |
| 26 | NewsHits | Rob Huebel | | Sergio Cilli | Abominable Pictures | May 31, 2016 |
| 27 | Mulchtown | Chris Sartinsky and Becca Kinskey | Chris Sartinsky | Danny Jelinek | Ideal Milk Co. Abominable Pictures (uncredited) | June 7, 2016 |
| 28 | Check It Out! with Scott Clam | John C. Reilly, Tim Heidecker, and Eric Wareheim | | Tim Heidecker and Eric Wareheim | Abso Lutely Productions | October 23, 2017 |
| 29 | The Suplex Duplex Complex | Zack Carlson, Bryan Connolly, and Todd Rohal | | Todd Rohal | PFFR; Ten Acre Films | October 30, 2017 |
| 30 | Wet Shapes | Kati Skelton | | | Little Bear Bear Productions; It's Grim | November 6, 2017 |
| 31 | Innovation Makers: The Coyote Suit | Dan Guterman and John Harris | | Danny Jelinek | Abso Lutely Productions | December 12, 2017 |
| 32 | A Message from the Future (Note: These two Infomercials were originally called: Nuclear Political Ad (for the first), and Farm to Table (for the second).) | Paul Scheer | Paul Scheer and Jonathan Stern | Ryan Perez | Abominable Pictures; 2nd Man On The Moon | June 4, 2018 |
| 33 | Cool Dad - Official Trailer | Alex Kavutskiy and Ariel Gardner | | | Abominable Pictures | June 11, 2018 |
| 34 | Dayworld | Cole Kush and Jay Weingarten | | | Abso Lutely Productions; Daytime Studio | June 18, 2018 |
| 35 | Final Deployment 4: Queen Battle Walkthrough (Note: Only half-hour Infomercial of the entire project.) | Casper Kelly and Nick Gibbons | | | Awesome Inc. | June 25, 2018 |
| 36 | Food: The Source of Life | Greg Hess | | Ryan Perez | Abominable Pictures | July 2, 2018 |
| 37 | Pervert Everything | Lorelei Ramirez | | | PFFR; Wham City | December 10, 2018 |
| 38 | Flayaway | Sarah Sherman | | Kati Skelton | Abso Lutely Productions; Helltrap Nightmare | December 17, 2018 |
| 39 | When Panties Fly | Chiyoung Lee | | | — | December 16, 2019 |
| 40 | Piggy | Steve Smith | Steve Smith & Clay Tatum | Steve Smith | Abso Lutely Productions | April 27, 2020 |
| 41 | Skeleton Landlord (Note: This infomercial was greenlit after being pitched on Adult Swim's weekly Development Meeting livestream.) | Doug Bleichner & Sam Wagstaff | | | — | May 4, 2020 |
| 42 | Wormholes | Benjamin Berman | Clark Baker, Benjamin Berman & Kirk C. Johnson | Benjamin Berman | The Ranch Productions | September 8, 2020 |
| 43 | 11 Minute Whambam 90's Ride! | Anders Holm | | | Abominable Pictures | November 30, 2020 |
| 44 | A Life In Questions: Wisdom School with Aaron Chen | Aaron Chen & Henry Stone | | Henry Stone | West Street Sports, Pty Ltd. | December 8, 2020 |
| 45 | Rate The Cookie (with Jo Firestone) | Jo Firestone | | Julie Miller | PFFR | December 14, 2020 |
| 46 | Danny Ketchup | Casper Kelly | | | Fried Society; Awesome Inc | December 21, 2020 |
| 47 | Adult Swim Yule Log | Casper Kelly | | | Fried Society | December 11, 2022 |
| 48 | Adult Swim Yule Log 2: Branchin' Out | Casper Kelly | | | Fried Society | December 6, 2024 |

=== Scrapped ===
- The Six Pack Comedy Minute
- Ultimate Beetles Collection
