= For-Profit Online University =

2013 Adult Swim television special

- Genre: Satire; Alternative comedy
- Created by: Wild, Aggressive Dog
- Teleplay by: Sam West
- Story by: Geoff Haggerty; Dan E. Klein; Matthew Klinman; Michael Pielocik; Chris Sartinsky; Sam West
- Directed by: Sam West
- Starring: Nicole Byer; Nelson Cheng; Nick Corirossi; Geoff Haggerty; Brian Huskey; Ingrid Tejada
- Country of origin: United States
- Original language: English

Production
- Executive producers: Geoff Haggerty; Becca Kinskey; Dan E. Klein; Matthew Klinman; Michael Pielocik; Chris Sartinsky; Jonathan Stern; Sam West
- Producers: Becca Kinskey; Jonathan Stern
- Cinematography: Kevin Atkinson
- Editor: Matthew Freund
- Running time: 11 minutes
- Production companies: Abominable Pictures; Williams Street

Original release
- Network: Adult Swim
- Release: December 17, 2013

Related
- Infomercials

For-Profit Online University is a television special written and directed by Sam West for Adult Swim. The special is presented as an infomercial parodying for-profit universities. The special is created by Wild, Aggressive Dog, a conglomerate of former Onion writers, consisting of Geoff Haggerty, Dan E. Klein, Matthew Klinman, Michael Pielocik, Chris Sartinsky and Sam West.

The special aired on December 17, 2013 at 4 a.m. on Cartoon Network's late-night programming block, Adult Swim. The special was viewed by 871,000 viewers and received a 0.6 rating in the 18–49 demographic Nielsen household rating.

== Synopsis ==
The infomercial consists of various students giving testimonies of their success, owing it to the school, literally named For-Profit Online University. Students pay for knowledge from a cloud service instead of attending traditional classes, and are offered jobs as 'Digital Gardeners,' solving CAPTCHA for digital currency. The first half foreshadows and the second half details the threat of an evil rogue spambot named Howard, who was bribed with a large sum of ThoughtCoins, a digital currency used through the school, in an attempt to placate him. The infomercial ends with Howard hijacking the filming process and exposing the university as a scam.

== Cast ==
- Nicole Byer as "22MuchBIZ"
- Nelson Cheng as "LetsFunHans"
- Nick Corirossi as "FPOU_DEAN"
- Geoff Haggerty as "USAdude1981"
- Brian Huskey as "FPOU_PROF_300954"
- Ingrid Tejada as "sALTedAngel69"
- HOWARD as "HOWARD"

== Production ==
The special presents itself as a spoof of for-profit universities infomercials, a source of frequent criticism and congressional investigation in the United States. The special is written and directed by Sam West, and is co-written by the creative writing team Wild Aggressive Dog, a conglomerate of former Onion writers, consisting of Geoff Haggerty, Dan Klein, Matthew Klinman, Michael Pielocik, Chris Sartinsky and Sam West.

== Reception ==
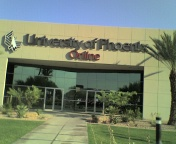
Gabe Dunn of The Daily Dot compared the fictional college to the University of Phoenix (Online campus pictured).

For-Profit Online University aired on December 17, 2013, at 4 a.m. on Cartoon Network's late-night programming block, Adult Swim. The special was published onto Adult Swim's YouTube channel the same day. Initially made private on their channel, the special became popular online after being spotted by comedy blogs. The special was viewed by 871,000 viewers and received a 0.6 rating in the 18–49 demographic Nielsen household rating.

Dan Simmons of the Wisconsin State Journal praised the special as "hilariously" parodying "what some in academia fear is a growing movement toward commodifying college." Andy Thomason of The Chronicle of Higher Education called the presentation of the special "brutal" in its criticism of both for-profit and traditional universities. Gabe Dunn of The Daily Dot compared the fictional college to the University of Phoenix in their review of the special. Laughing Squid's EDW Lynch called the infomercial "hilarious", while Splitsider stated of all of Adult Swim's faux-infomercials, the special was "the best one yet".

== See also ==
- Live Forever as You Are Now with Alan Resnick
- Paid Programming
- You're Whole
- Too Many Cooks
