= Alan Resnick =

American artist, filmmaker and comedian (born 1986)

- Born: July 16, 1986 (age 40); Oswego, New York
- Education: SUNY Purchase
- Years active: 2011–present
- Spouse: Dina Kelberman

Comedy career
- Medium: Television; film; internet
- Genres: Alternative comedy; black comedy; comedy horror; surreal humor; absurdist fiction; satirical comedy

Alan Resnick (born July 16, 1986) is an American comedian, visual artist, and filmmaker. He is a member of the Wham City arts collective and founding member of Wham City Comedy.

== Life and education ==
Resnick was born and raised in Oswego, New York and went on to attend college at SUNY Purchase. In 2008, he moved to Baltimore, Maryland where he maintains a studio at the Copycat Building and, along with friends from SUNY Purchase, joined Wham City, an arts and music collective.

== Career ==
=== 2011–2014: Early work on YouTube ===
Before working on Adult Swim, Resnick first gained recognition for creating the popular YouTube web series, alantutorial, in 2011. The surrealist series initially began as a tutorial channel from a man attempting to instruct the viewer on nonsensical tasks. Over the course of three years, the series gained strong horror elements as the videos depicted Alan locked out of his house, left homeless, and kidnapped. In the final "tutorial" video, uploaded on December 12, 2014, Alan breaks through a wall and escapes the building where he was being held. Gizmodo called Resnick's video "ARM tutorial" one of the "weirdest videos on the internet".

In 2012, Resnick self-published the book $8.95, a series of online customer service chats between Resnick and Bank of America in which Resnick pleads to recover his eponymous bank fee. Also that year, Resnick directed the music video for Dan Deacon's "Guilford Avenue Bridge" and Lower Dens' "Candy".

=== 2013–present: Adult Swim ===
In 2013, Resnick and fellow Wham City member Ben O'Brien created and directed the television special Live Forever as You Are Now with Alan Resnick, pitched to Adult Swim. The short starred Resnick as himself, in a surreal parody of self-help infomercials, selling digital immortality. This was the duo's first collaboration with Adult Swim and premiered on the network's Infomercials block at 4:00 a.m., without a title card or common identifier. Despite this, it received positive acclaim and recognition for Wham City, being called "hilarious" and "a good representation of their bizarre comedic stylings." Principal photography for the infomercial was conducted in the Copycat Building during the summer of 2013.

In 2014, Resnick and O'Brien continued to work with Adult Swim's Infomercials, creating the horror short Unedited Footage of a Bear, a parody of allergy medication advertisements, and a veiled cautionary tale about antidepressant abuse, which slowly descends into chaos. The short gained the duo more popularity, and was called "the scariest TV show of 2014". Since launching that year, Resnick has been a contributing writer for The Onion's sister publication, ClickHole. Resnick also premiered a set of new media art pieces in collaboration with artist Lesser Gonzalez, at the Springsteen Gallery in Baltimore, MD.

In 2016, Adult Swim aired Resnick's third short film, This House Has People in It. The short film aired at 4:00 a.m. between March 14–19. The short itself consists of surveillance camera footage of a mundane suburban family that descends into surreal horror as the eldest daughter begins phasing through the kitchen floor, based on the found footage genre. Clues hidden throughout This House then direct viewers towards a fake security company website with additional surveillance material of the family and the paranormal events surrounding them, as well as a bootleg episode of a fictional TV show titled the Scultor's Clayground [sic] and its associated website run by the eponymous host (played by Resnick himself). The resulting alternate reality game explores many of the events leading up to and following This House with a total of over two hours' worth of video and audio files alongside numerous logs, images, and text documents.

In 2022, he created a music video for "I Didn't Know I Was Dead" by Negativland. That same year, he co-directed (with Patti Harrison) the music video for "Bicstan" by Hudson Mohawke.

=== 2026–present: InfoWars ===
In 2026, Resnick directed the web series Nerve Center for the satirical rendition of InfoWars.

== Personal life ==
Resnick lived in Baltimore for 10 years and is currently residing in Los Angeles. He is married to fellow artist Dina Kelberman.

== Filmography ==
=== Television ===
Year	Title	Role	Notes
2013	Live Forever as You Are Now with Alan Resnick	Himself	Also creator and writer
2014	Unedited Footage of a Bear	Bear narrator	Also director, writer and executive producer
2016	This House Has People in It/Sculptor's Clayground	The Sculptor	Also director, writer and executive producer
2018	May I Please Enter	Lone Cowboy/Himself	Writer and director
2020	What Codec Should I Use?	Himself	Writer and director
2022	Cool Blue Car	Writer and director	
2024	Star Wars: Skeleton Crew	Tuut Orial	In the episode "Way, Way Out Past the Barrier"
2025	Common Side Effects	Zane (voice)	3 episodes

=== Web series ===
Year	Title	Role	Notes
2011–2014	alantutorial	Alan	Also creator and writer
2015	Visitor Information	Sick person/garage	Also director and writer
2016	Children of the Mirror	Wesley	Also editor, photography director and executive producer
2017	The Cry of Mann: A Trool Day Holiday Spectacular in Eight Parts	Jack Mann	Also writer
2018	Electronic Game Information	Himself	Also additional writer
2019	Everything Borrowed	Dancing Jerry Paper	Also director
2021	Mac and Cheese	n/a	Creator
2026–present	Nerve Center	n/a	Director

=== Audiobook ===
Year	Title	Role	Notes
2021	Reverse Transmission	Car	
