= Williams Street =

American animation studio

Williams Street Productions, LLC
- Logo used since 1999

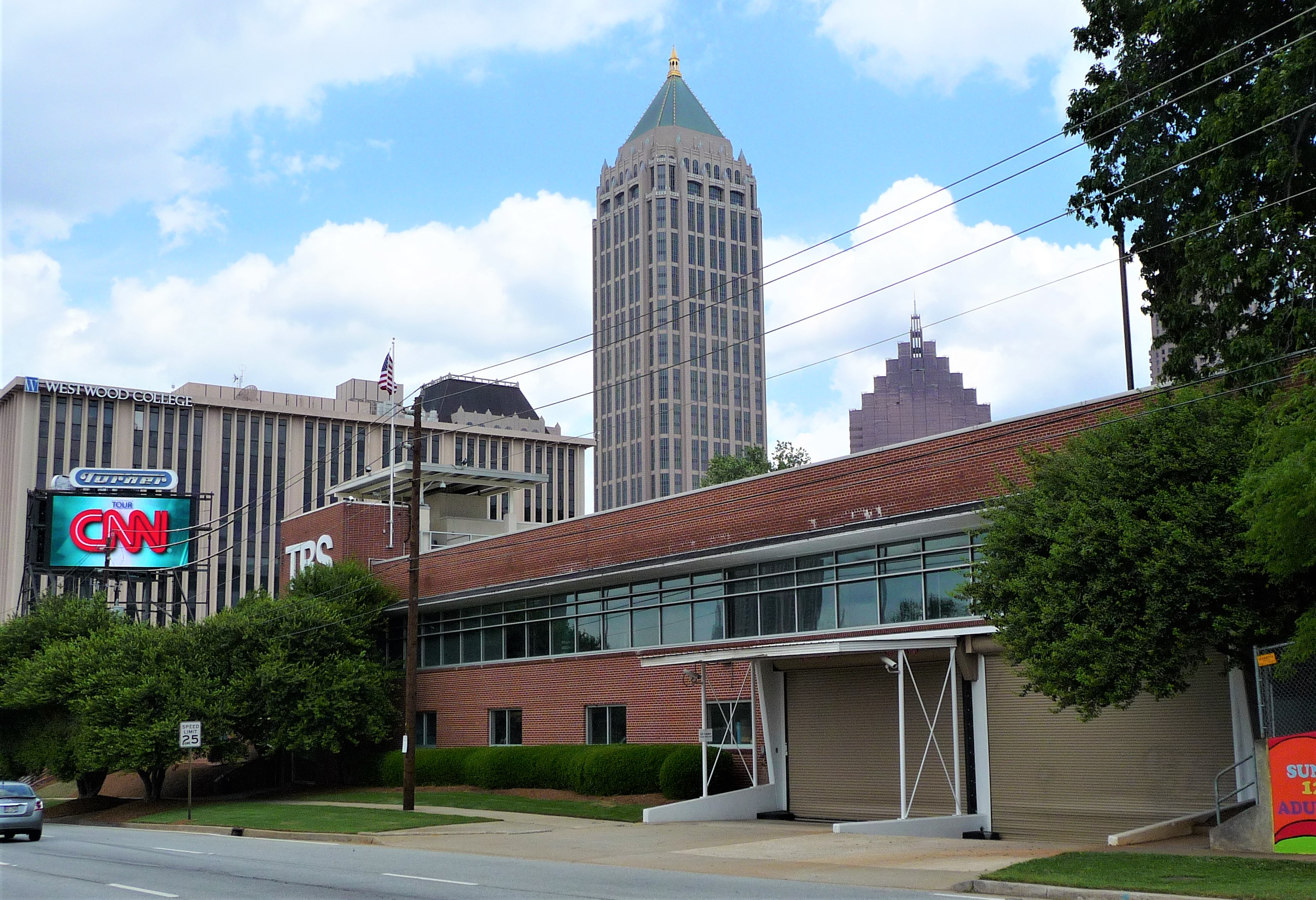
- Headquarters in Midtown Atlanta, photographed in 2011
- Trade name: Williams Street
- Formerly: Cartoon Network Productions (1992–1999); Ghost Planet Industries (1994–1999)
- Type: Label
- Industry: Film; Television
- Genre: Animation; Live action
- Founded: March 12, 1992; 34 years ago
- Founders: Mike Lazzo; Andy Merrill; Khaki Jones
- Headquarters: 1065 Williams Street NW, Atlanta, Georgia, U.S. (1992–present); 100 S California St., Burbank, California, U.S. (2023–present)
- Key people: Michael Ouweleen (President, The Cartoon Network, Inc.); Jason DeMarco (SVP, action/anime); Michael Cahill (VP, on-air/social media); Chris Hartley (VP, on-air production); Kim Manning (VP, programming); Cameron Tang (VP, development)
- Products: Television series; Television specials; Feature films
- Owner: Skydance
- Parent: The Cartoon Network, Inc. (1992–2026); Skydance Television Animation (2026–present)
- Divisions: Williams Street Records

Williams Street Productions, LLC, formerly known as Cartoon Network Productions and Ghost Planet Industries, is an American animation and live action television production studio owned by Skydance Television Animation, a unit of Skydance through its TV division. The studio is the in-house production arm of Cartoon Network and mainly produces content for its nighttime programming block Adult Swim. Mike Lazzo and Keith Crofford oversaw operations for the building for most of its existence.

On December 16, 2019, co-founder Lazzo retired from the company, with business partner and co-founder Crofford retiring the following year. Michael Ouweleen was named president of Adult Swim on April 29, 2020 as well as The Cartoon Network, Inc. from November 27, 2019 to July 1, 2020 and since May 13, 2022.

== History ==
In 1976, Ted Turner bought a building at 1065 Williams Street NW in Atlanta, Georgia, using it for his own television station, WTCG. This new channel was the result of a recent UHF takeover. The facility began as a carpet factory and was purchased by Turner as overflow offices for, among other things, set building and woodworking facilities. In December 1976, the first WTCG signal was beamed via satellite to its four cable systems located around Georgia. Starting out as a minor local channel, the station grew into success and was re-launched as WTBS in 1979, Turner bought the call sign from MIT's low-power student-run Technology Broadcasting System FM station. Then, after a five-year period, WTBS was renamed TBS Superstation. During this time, Turner also created CNN, a 24-hour news network. Both became the standard for cable providers by the late 80s. Due to this success, the studio building became too small to operate as a headquarters. A new campus was built across the street for the expanding Turner empire. Upon completion, Turner launched Cartoon Network to showcase their recent acquisitions of the vast Metro-Goldwyn-Mayer (MGM) and Hanna-Barbera library of cartoons, operated by newly formed division The Cartoon Network, Inc. When Cartoon Network moved out of the Williams Street building, they kept ownership, using it as a storage facility. Although no longer its main purpose, to this day, it houses all the show tapes for Turner Networks. The current name of the company originates from the location of its headquarters building. The street is named for early Atlanta settler Ammi Williams.

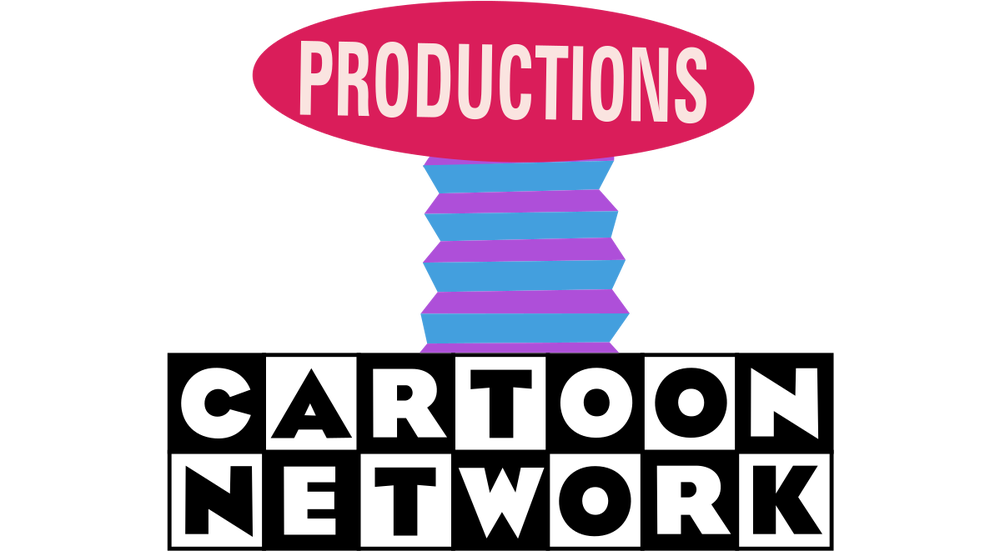
Logo used from 1994 to 1998.

Cartoon Network Productions was formed in 1992 to produce the channel's programming, with its first programmers including Turner employee Mike Lazzo, CNN holdover Andy Merrill and executive Khaki Jones. From 1990 to 1993, TBS started original animated programming from Hanna-Barbera such as Captain Planet and 2 Stupid Dogs. Turner refused to allow them to commission original programming, instead emphasizing they needed to prioritize using the corporate archive of animation he recently acquired, such as the Hanna-Barbera library. Among the first productions by the network were anthology series such as ToonHeads.

As Lazzo recounts, “Ted has said, ‘I bought you a library, now utilize it.'" It was from this library that the Cartoon Network programmers created the channel's first fully original series, The Moxy Show. The series' failure was followed by Lazzo's desire to create an adult-oriented series for the network's late night block, leading to the creation of Space Ghost Coast to Coast. They decided to produce their own series pilot. On a shoestring budget, they tried to come up with compatible ideas. During brainstorming, they realized they could simply re-use footage of any series in the Turner library. They eventually settled on Space Ghost and Dino Boy. Because they felt it would fit, they paired it with Mike Lazzo's idea of a satirical talk show with a clueless host asking guests a stream of stupid questions. The final pilot featured rotoscoped animation superimposed on a simple background and used CNN interview footage for the live-action interview. The pilot was completed and presented to Cartoon Network, and Space Ghost Coast to Coast was then greenlit for a ten-episode season. Soon the series was acquiring its first C and D-list celebrity guests, small animation and writing crew, and voice actors. Space Ghost was voiced by local voice actor George Lowe instead of Gary Owens to save costs, while C. Martin Croker, an animator poached from Designefx, performed other roles. Screenwriter Matt Maiellaro and editor Michael Cahill were brought on through connections to Lazzo, contributing to the series' unique surreal humor and rapid-fire editing. The series eventually premiered on April 14, 1994. Due to its more mature and surreal humor, the series attracted a devoted cult audience. Its success led to a special that was simulcast on TBS, a special short for VHS release of blockbuster The Mask, and guests who were more well-known.

Jones and Merrill left the series to handle the network's children-focused programming, while Maiellaro and Cahill left with their own intentions. In the height of its popularity, Turner commissioned Cartoon Network to produce a child-friendly version of the series for TBS, due to a need for children's programming. Cartoon Planet premiered on TBS in 1995 and later moved to Cartoon Network in 1996; Merrill returned to both series to provide Brak's voice. The studio eventually split from Cartoon Network's programming department to form Williams Street, while Hanna-Barbera, later Cartoon Network Studios, was commissioned to produce daytime programming for the network. The series featured Space Ghost hosting segments and cartoons for young viewers. After two seasons, TBS decided to cancel all kids' programming, following the trend of TNT and USA Network, with its segments being repurposed for a variety show of the same name on Cartoon Network. "Ghost Planet Industries" was a label used by Cartoon Network exclusively for Space Ghost-related projects at the time.

Alongside Cartoon Network Studios' rapid expansion since What a Cartoon!'s success, Williams Street started producing series for Cartoon Network's late night time slots, with Matt Maiellaro, Dave Willis and former production assistants Adam Reed and Matt Thompson among those being contracted to develop new series. Between 4:00 and 5:00 a.m. on December 21, and December 30, 2000 (while Space Ghost Coast to Coast was on hiatus), several new Williams Street series made unannounced "stealth" premieres. Sealab 2021; Harvey Birdman, Attorney at Law; Aqua Teen Hunger Force; and The Brak Show all premiered unannounced; the official schedules listed the shows as "Special Programming". Prior to that, in Entertainment Weekly, it was stated that Michael Ouweleen's next project was working on the Harvey Birdman, Attorney at Law Pilot with J. J. Sedelmaier. In a 1999 interview, the indie pop rock band Calamine stated they had recorded the theme song for Sealab 2021. While entertaining pitches for a variety of adult cartoons, Lazzo realized the potential for packaging them as a complete adult-focused block. Different names were considered, "Parental Warning" and "Parental Block" but he eventually settled on "Adult Swim" .

Cartoon Network originally intended to launch the adult animation block on April 1, 2001, but it was delayed by five months. In June 2001, TV Guide had recorded an interview with Cartoon Network's former president, Betty Cohen. She stated there was a new programming block coming out in September that was aimed for an adult audience. During this month at the Cartoon Network Confidential, "Cartoon Network's best originals and outrageous animated shorts for discriminating adults" in New York City, an upcoming episode of Space Ghost Coast to Coast titled "Kentucky Nightmare", the stealth pilots from December, Captain Linger, and an episode of Home Movies were screened for free. The screening was part of the Toyota Comedy Festival. On Saturday, July 21, 2001, the Space Ghost Coast to Coast panel at San Diego Comic-Con had a trivia game in which the winners won a promotional CD that had the theme songs to the upcoming Adult Swim Shows. Everybody who attended got a free Adult Swim t-shirt that was packaged to look like a roll of bandages that a lifeguard might carry.

== Name and logo ==
The company's original name, Ghost Planet Industries, came from Space Ghost's fictional planet, where the animated talk show Space Ghost Coast to Coast was purportedly filmed. The company's production logo features a wavy, blurred gray image of Space Ghost's fictional studio, with the words "Williams Street" or formerly "Ghost Planet Industries" beneath it. The soundtrack of Jack Webb's Mark VII Limited's production logo (a rumbling drum roll and two clinks of a hammer) is used while the GPI/Williams Street production card is shown.

== Filmography ==
=== TV animated series ===
Title	Creator(s) Developer(s)	Co-production(s)	Notes	Started
ToonHeads	N/A	N/A	Anthology series. Credited as Cartoon Network.	1992–2003
The Moxy Show	N/A	Colossal Pictures; Turner Studios	Anthology series known under various titles. Credited as Cartoon Network.	1993–96
Space Ghost Coast to Coast	Mike Lazzo	N/A	Based on the original 1966 animated series. Credited as Cartoon Network Productions for the first five seasons and Williams Street West for the eighth and ninth seasons. The company was not involved with the GameTap season.	1994–2004
Cartoon Planet	Andy Merrill and Pete Smith	N/A	Series version of the programming block of the same name. Credited as Cartoon Network Productions.	1997–98
Sealab 2021	Adam Reed and Matt Thompson	70/30 Productions	Based on Sealab 2020.	2000–05
The Brak Show	Jim Fortier, Andy Merrill, and Pete Smith	Turner Studios	A spin-off of Space Ghost Coast to Coast. This series ran for 28 episodes, and a webisode was released as the series finale.	2000–03; 2007
Harvey Birdman, Attorney at Law	Michael Ouweleen and Erik Richter	J. J. Sedelmaier Productions, Inc. (Pilot only); Turner Studios (Seasons 2–4)	The company produced the Pilot, and from Season 2's eleventh episode to Season 4. Reused assets from Birdman and the Galaxy Trio.	2000–07; 2018
Aqua Teen Hunger Force	Matt Maiellaro and Dave Willis	N/A	Animated series also known by various alternative titles. First spin-off of Space Ghost Coast to Coast. It was the first series that had a theatrical movie. One episode was never aired. Longest running Cartoon Network/Adult Swim original series that was in production.	2000–15; 2023
The Popeye Show	N/A	N/A	Anthology series. Credited as Cartoon Network.	2001–03
The Venture Bros.	Jackson Publick and Doc Hammer	Astro-Base GO! World Leaders Entertainment; Titmouse, Inc.	Credited as Cartoon Network for the first five seasons.	2003–18
Stroker & Hoop	Casper Kelly and Jeffrey G. Olsen	Turner Studios		2004–05
Perfect Hair Forever	Mike Lazzo, Matt Harrigan, and Matt Maiellaro	N/A	A spin-off of Space Ghost Coast to Coast.	2004–07; 2014
Tom Goes to the Mayor	Tim Heidecker and Eric Wareheim	Dipshot Films (Season 1); Abso Lutely Productions (Season 2)		2004–06
Robot Chicken	Seth Green and Matthew Senreich	Stoop!d Monkey; ShadowMachine (Seasons 1–5); Stoopid Buddy Stoodios (Season 6–present); Sony Pictures Digital (Seasons 1–5); Sony Pictures Television (Seasons 6–10) (Note: Post-2025 specials only, after SPT pulled out of co-producing the show's eleventh season onwards.)	Second longest running original series on Adult Swim that is still in production.	2005–present
12 oz. Mouse	Matt Maiellaro	N/A		2005–07; 2018; 2020
Squidbillies	Jim Fortier and Dave Willis	N/A		2005–21
Lucy, the Daughter of the Devil	Loren Bouchard	Fluid Animation; Loren Bouchard L.L.C.		2005–07
Minoriteam	Adam de la Peña, Peter Girardi, and Todd James	Funny Garbage; Reas International; Monkey Wrangler Productions		2005–06
Moral Orel	Dino Stamatopoulos	ShadowMachine; Fragical Productions		2005–08
Metalocalypse	Brendon Small and Tommy Blacha	Titmouse, Inc.		2006–13
Frisky Dingo	Adam Reed and Matt Thompson	70/30 Productions		2006–08
Assy McGee	Matt Harrigan and Carl W. Adams	Soup2Nuts (Season 1); Clambake Animation (Season 2)		2006–08
Superjail!	Christy Karacas, Stephen Warbrick, and Ben Gruber	Titmouse, Inc. Augenblick Studios (Pilot and Season 1)		2007–14
The Drinky Crow Show	Tony Millionaire and Eric Kaplan	Mirari Films		2007–09
Xavier: Renegade Angel	Vernon Chatman, John Lee, Alyson Levy, and Jim Tozzi	PFFR; Cinematico		2007–09
Titan Maximum	Tom Root and Matthew Senreich	ShadowMachine; Stoop!d Monkey; Tom Is Awesome		2009
Mary Shelley's Frankenhole	Dino Stamatopoulos	Fragical Productions (Season 1); ShadowMachine (Season 1); Starburns Industries (Season 2 only)		2010–12
Off the Air	Dave Hughes	Million Monkeys Inc.	First live-action/animation hybrid series aired on Adult Swim.	2011–present
Mongo Wrestling Alliance	Tommy Blacha	Mirari Films	Originally called The Galaxy Wrestling Alliance.	2011
Soul Quest Overdrive	Matt Maiellaro and Dave Willis	N/A	Based on the short pilot winner of the online contest Big, Über, Network Sampling, sponsored by Burger King. A spin-off of Aqua Teen Hunger Force. There was also an unaired pilot when the first episode was shown online for the same online contest.	2011; 2010
China, IL	Brad Neely	Neely Comics; Titmouse, Inc. Working For Monsters (Season 3 only)		2011–15; 2010
Black Dynamite	Michael Jai White, Byron Minns, and Scott Sanders (original live-action movie) (d): Carl Jones	Ars Nova Entertainment; Titmouse, Inc. (Season 1 only); N-BOMB SQUAD (Season 2 only); Cartoon Network Studios (Season 2 only)	Based on the 2009 film of the same name. Rights owned by Ars Nova.	2012–15; 2011
Mr. Pickles	Will Carsola and Dave Stewart	HotHouse Productions; Day by Day Productions		2013–19
Rick and Morty	Justin Roiland and Dan Harmon	Justin Roiland's Solo Vanity Card Productions! (Seasons 1–8); Harmonious Claptrap; Starburns Industries (Seasons 1–2); Green Portal Productions (Seasons 4–5)		2013–present
Mike Tyson Mysteries	Mike Tyson, Lee Stimmer, and Hugh Davidson (d): Giancarlo Volpe and Hugh Davidson	Warner Bros. Animation	First collaboration with sister studio Warner Bros. Animation. Rights owned by Warner Bros. Entertainment.	2014–20
Brad Neely's Harg Nallin' Sclopio Peepio	Brad Neely	Neely Comics; Working For Monsters; Titmouse, Inc.		2016
Hot Streets	Brian Wysol	Stoopid Buddy Stoodios; Justin Roiland's Solo Vanity Card Productions!		2016–19
Apollo Gauntlet	Myles Langlois	Mosaic Media Group; 6 Point Harness		2016–17
Samurai Jack	Genndy Tartakovsky	Cartoon Network Studios	Only the fifth season. Premiered on Toonami.	2017
The Jellies!	Tyler Okonma and Lionel Boyce	Bald Fade Productions; Augenblick Studios; Whalerock Industries		2017–19
Tender Touches	David Bonawits, Lauren Payne, and Maxime Simonet	N/A		2017–20
FLCL Progressive / Alternative	Gainax (original OVA series) (d): Production I.G	Production I.G; Toho		2018
Ballmastrz: 9009	Christy Karacas	Titmouse, Inc. (Seasons 1–2); C.C.K. Rad (Season 2); PFFR (Special); Studio 4°C (Special)		2018–20; 2023
Tigtone	Andrew Koehler and Benjamin Martian	Babyhemyth Productions; Titmouse, Inc.		2018–20
The Shivering Truth	Vernon Chatman	PFFR; ShadowMachine (Season 1); HouseSpecial (Season 2)		2018–20
Lazor Wulf	Henry Bonsu (d): Henry Bonsu and Daniel Weidenfeld	Titmouse, Inc. (Pilot); Bento Box Entertainment (Season 1); 6 Point Harness (Season 2)		2019–21
Gēmusetto	Maxime Simonet	N/A	All 6 episodes of season 1 premiered in one go in 2019; season 2 was released on Toonami in 2020.	2019–20
Primal	Genndy Tartakovsky	Cartoon Network Studios	First full series collaboration with Cartoon Network Studios that is not based on a pre-existing property.	2019–present
Momma Named Me Sheriff	Will Carsola and Dave Stewart	HotHouse Productions; Day by Day Productions	A spin-off of Mr. Pickles.	2019–21
YOLO	Michael Cusack	Princess Bento Studio; Monkeystack; Cusack Creatures (Seasons 2–3)	Pilot for the series premiered as part of Adult Swim's April Fools' Day celebration.	2020–25
JJ Villard's Fairy Tales	J.J. Villard	Villard Film; Cartoon Network Studios	Pilot for the series premiered as part of Adult Swim's April Fools' Day celebration.	2020
Smiling Friends	Zach Hadel and Michael Cusack	6 Point Harness (Pilot only); Goblin Caught on Tape	Pilot for the series premiered as part of Adult Swim's April Fools' Day celebration.	2020–2026
Birdgirl	Michael Ouweleen and Erik Richter (d): Erik Richter and Christina Miller	Bedford Avenue	A spin-off of Harvey Birdman, Attorney at Law.	2021–22
Tuca & Bertie	Lisa Hanawalt	The Tornante Company; Brave Dummy; Vegan Blintzes; ShadowMachine	Starting with the second season. Rights owned by The Tornante Company.	2021–22
Fena: Pirate Princess	Kazuto Nakazawa and Production I.G	Crunchyroll; Production I.G	First Adult Swim series to be produced with Crunchyroll. Rights owned by Production I.G.	2021
Teenage Euthanasia	Alyson Levy and Alissa Nutting	PFFR; Augenblick Studios (Season 1); Atomic Cartoons (Season 2)		2021–23
Blade Runner: Black Lotus	Philip K. Dick (original characters) (d): Kenji Kamiyama and Shinji Aramaki	Alcon Entertainment; Crunchyroll	Second Adult Swim series to be co-produced with Crunchyroll. A spin-off of Blade Runner. Rights owned by Alcon Entertainment.	2021–22
Shenmue: The Animation	Yu Suzuki (concept) and Sega (story) (d): Chikara Sakurai	Sega; Crunchyroll	Based on the video games Shenmue (1999) and Shenmue II (2001). Rights owned by Sega.	2022
Housing Complex C	amphibian (original concept)	Production I.G USA	Rights owned by Production I.G.	2022
Oh My God... Yes! A Series of Extremely Relatable Circumstances	Adele "Supreme" Williams	Undercooked Rice; 6 Point Harness; Honeywater Entertainment (pilot only)		2023–25
Royal Crackers	Jason Ruiz (d): Jason Ruiz and Seth Cohen	The Cheesesteak Factory; AntiLaugh; Titmouse, Inc.		2023–24
FLCL: Grunge / Shoegaze	Gainax (original OVA series) (d): Production I.G	Production I.G	Rights owned by Production I.G.	2023
Ninja Kamui	Sunghoo Park	E&H Production; Sola Entertainment		2024–present
Uzumaki	Junji Ito (original manga series)	Production I.G USA	Rights owned by Production I.G.	2024
Common Side Effects	Joseph Bennett and Steve Hely	Green Street Pictures; Bandera Entertainment; Tell Me More		2025–present; 2024
Lazarus	Shinichirō Watanabe	Sola Entertainment		2025
Women Wearing Shoulder Pads	Gonzalo Cordova	Tres Tristes Tigres; Cinema Fantasma	First Spanish-language series to be produced for Adult Swim.	2025
Haha, You Clowns	Joe Cappa	N/A	First series to be picked up after airing as part of the Adult Swim Smalls series.	2025–present
President Curtis	James Siciliano and Dan Harmon	Pug Party; Harmonious Claptrap	Spin-off of Rick and Morty.	2026–present

=== TV live-action series ===
Title	Creator(s) Developer(s)	Co-production(s)	Notes	Started
Tim and Eric Awesome Show, Great Job!	Tim Heidecker and Eric Wareheim	Abso Lutely Productions	First live-action series produced for Adult Swim.	2007–10; 2017
Saul of the Mole Men	Craig Lewis (d): Peter Girardi, Craig Lewis, and Tom Stern	Funny Garbage		2007
Fat Guy Stuck in Internet	John Gemberling and Curtis Gwinn	Cowboy & John Productions		2007–08
Delocated	Jon Glaser	PFFR; Unintelligible Grunt		2008–13
Check It Out! with Dr. Steve Brule	John C. Reilly, Tim Heidecker, and Eric Wareheim	Abso Lutely Productions	A spin-off of Tim and Eric Awesome Show, Great Job!.	2010–17
Childrens Hospital	Rob Corddry	The Corddry Company; Abominable Pictures; Warner Bros. Studio 2.0; Warner Bros. Television	Based on the web series of the same name on TheWB.com. Rights owned by Warner Bros. Entertainment.	2010–16
Run It Back	Mike Terrell and Sean Akins	Turner Sports; Turner Studios	A remix version of NBA on TNT that which was aired only on the Cartoon Network block CN Real.	2010–11
Eagleheart	Michael Koman and Andrew Weinberg	Dakota Pictures; Conaco		2011–14
NTSF:SD:SUV::	Paul Scheer	2nd Man On The Moon; Abominable Pictures	First spin-off of Children's Hospital.	2011–13
The Heart, She Holler	Vernon Chatman, John Lee, and Alyson Levy	PFFR		2011–14
Loiter Squad	Odd Future	Dickhouse Productions (Seasons 1–2); Gorilla Flicks (Season 3); The Great Wang Of The Floggnaw Land (Season 3)		2012–14
The Eric Andre Show	Eric André	Abso Lutely Productions; Sick Duck Productions; Naked Faces (Seasons 1–4); Working For Monsters (Seasons 1–2); Fugue State (Seasons 5–6)		2012–23
The Restless Bell	Dave Drabik and Andrew Benator	Fine Line Productions; Turner Studios		2012
You're Whole	Michael Ian Black	Abominable Pictures		2012–13
Newsreaders	Rob Corddry, Jonathan Stern, and David Wain	The Corddry Company; Abominable Pictures; Warner Bros. Studio 2.0; Warner Bros. Television	Also known as Newsreaders with Louis LaFonda. Second and final spin-off of Children's Hospital.	2013–15
Your Pretty Face Is Going to Hell	Casper Kelly and Dave Willis	Fake Wood Wallpaper Films		2013–19; 2011
Hot Package	Derrick Beckles	Abso Lutely Productions; TV Carnage; Abominable Pictures (Season 1 only)		2013–15
Tim & Eric's Bedtime Stories	Tim Heidecker and Eric Wareheim	Abso Lutely Productions		2013–17
Black Jesus	Aaron McGruder and Mike Clattenburg	5 Mutts Productions; Triage Entertainment; Mainstay Entertainment (Season 3)		2014–19
Decker	Tim Heidecker and Gregg Turkington	Abso Lutely Productions	Both web and TV series on a spin-off from On Cinema.	2014–17
Neon Joe, Werewolf Hunter	Jon Glaser	PFFR; Unintelligible Grunt		2015–17
Million Dollar Extreme Presents: World Peace	Million Dollar Extreme	Million Dollar Extreme; Rent Now Productions		2016
Dream Corp LLC	Daniel Stessen	BEMO; Artbelly Productions; Caviar Content (Season 1); Sunday Night Productions; Alive and Kicking, Inc. (Seasons 2–3)	Second live-action/animation hybrid series aired on Adult Swim.	2016–20
Joe Pera Talks with You	Joe Pera	Chestnut Walnut Unlimited; Factual Productions (Season 1); Alive and Kicking, Inc. (Seasons 2–3)		2018–21
Mostly 4 Millennials	Derrick Beckles	TV Carnage; Sick Duck Productions; Factual Productions		2018
Tropical Cop Tales	Jim Hosking and Toby Harvard	Another HH Production; Boxel Studio; Alive and Kicking, Inc.		2018–19
Three Busy Debras	Sandy Honig, Mitra Jouhari, and Alyssa Stonoh	Mail Lizard; Paper Kite Productions; Alive and Kicking, Inc.		2020–22
Beef House	Tim Heidecker and Eric Wareheim	Abso Lutely Productions		2020
The Terrors of Jordan Mendoza	Jordan Mendoza	Avalon Television; Abominable Pictures; Sasa Pictures		2026–present

=== Internet series ===
Title	Creator(s) Developer	Co-production(s)	Notes	Started
Carl's Stone Cold Lock of the Century of the Week	Matt Maiellaro and Dave Willis	N/A	Based on Carl Brutananadilewski from Aqua Teen Hunger Force.	2007–16
King Star King	J.J. Villard; Eric Kaplan (co-creator, Pilot only) (d): Tommy Blacha	Mirari Films (Pilot); Kurtis (Series); Titmouse, Inc. (Series); Villard Film (Special)		2013–14; 2023
The Cry of Mann	Robby Rackleff	AB Video Solutions, LLC	Also known as The Cry of Mann: A Trool Day Holiday Spectacular, or The Cry of Mann: A Trool Day Holiday Spectacular in Eight Parts.	2017
Williams Stream: On Cinema (2012–20); FishCenter Live (2014–20); Pregame Prognostifications from the Pigskin Wyzzard (2017–18); Last Stream on the Left (2016–20)	N/A	(See Online programming)	This service plays highlights of various programs (in talk show and live podcast/chat formats) played on Adult Swim's live stream.	2017–20
The Call of Warr	Robby Rackleff	AB Video Solutions, LLC	Only sequel to The Cry of Mann.	2018
Alabama Jackson	Donald Faison	Adeosun; Stoopid Buddy Stoodios	Spin-off of Robot Chicken.	2022
Aquadonk Side Pieces	Matt Maiellaro and Dave Willis	N/A	Spin-off of Aqua Teen Hunger Force.	2022
Vindicators 2	Justin Roiland and Dan Harmon	Atomic Cartoons	Spin-off of Rick and Morty.	2022
Your Pretty Face Is Going to Hell: The Cartoon	Casper Kelly and Dave Willis	N/A	Sequel to Your Pretty Face Is Going to Hell.	2022

=== Failed pilots ===
Title	Creator(s) Developer(s)	Co-production(s)	Notes	Year
Spacecataz	Matt Maiellaro and Dave Willis	N/A	A failed spin-off of Aqua Teen Hunger Force.	2004
Korgoth of Barbaria	Aaron Springer	Cartoon Network Studios	Rejected due to high production costs. First collaboration with sister studio Cartoon Network Studios.	2006
Let's Fish (Note: Part of Night of 1000 Pilots.)	Mark Rivers	Titmouse, Inc.	Also known as Let's Fish with Don Conway.	2007
That Crook'd 'Sipp	Nick Weidenfeld, Jacob Escobedo, and Mike Weiss	Turner Studios	Spun-off into the special Freaknik: The Musical. Episode: "That Tree of Strife".	2007
Lowe Country	George Lowe	N/A		2007
Stiff	Matt Maiellaro	N/A		2007
Neon Knome (Note: Part of the online contest Big, Über, Network Sampling, sponsored by Burger King.)	Ben Jones	PFFR	Greenlit but moved to Cartoon Network due to Adult Swim executives thinking it was too "mind-blowingly cute" for the block and reworked into The Problem Solverz.	2008
Snake 'n' Bacon	Michael Kupperman, Scott Jacobson, and Rich Blomquist	Fayettenam Records Corp.	Based on the comic strip on the same name.	2009
Paid Programming	H. Jon Benjamin and David Cross	N/A	Despite being rejected by Adult Swim, the pilot gave way to a project of stand-alone specials based on fake infomercials.	2009
The New Big Ball with Neil Hamburger	Gregg Turkington, Tim Heidecker, and Eric Wareheim	Abso Lutely Productions	A failed spin-off of Tim and Eric Awesome Show, Great Job!.	2009
Yappy Broads	Madeleine Smithberg	Mad Cow Productions		2009
Cheyenne Cinnamon and the Fantabulous Unicorn of Sugar Town Candy Fudge	Dave Willis and Matt Harrigan	N/A		2010
Duckworth	Dave Willis and Matt Harrigan	N/A	Also known as Duckworth of Ellington.	2010
Southies	Carl W. Adams (d): Will Hayes	Clambake Animation		2011
Totally for Teens	Derrick Beckles and Sabrina Saccoccio	TV Carnage		2011
Major Lazer	Diplo, Switch, Ferry Gouw, and Kevin Kusatsu	Mad Decent; Titmouse, Inc.	After its cancellation, FXX picked up it for a TV series as part of FOX's Animation Domination High-Def (ADHD) block.	2011
Guy Suavé: Homicidal Spy	Eric Von Hoffman and Jay Johnston	Dakota Pictures; Johnston Hoffman Production	Shown as a trailer at The ABC Sunday Night Movie.	2011
Tight Bros	Sam Johnson and Chris Marcil	Clambake Animation	The series, originally planned to air in 2012, was canceled some time before the premiere for unknown reasons.	2011
Freestyle Love Supreme	Thomas Kail, Adam Peltzman, and Anthony Veneziale	Ars Nova Entertainment; Just Us Chickens		2012
Let's Do This!	Bob Odenkirk, Brian Jarvis, and Jim Freeman	LeFoole, Inc. Odenkirk Provissiero	Also known as Let's Do This!: The Story of Cal-Gold Pictures.	2012
Green Bench: The American Day Dream (Note: Part of the online contest Adult Swim Pilots, sponsored by KFC.)	Jamaal R. Fisher, John Holland, and Nicholas Travis (d): Lawrence Denning, Jr., Larnell Harris, and Louis Hatcher	Dakota Pictures; Greenbench Productions		2013
Candy Ranch	Three Loco	Abso Lutely Productions		2013
Übermansion	Zeb Wells and Matthew Senreich	Stoop!d Monkey; Stoopid Buddy Stoodios	Re-tooled as SuperMansion for Crackle.	2013
Filthy Sexy Teen$	Paul Scheer, Jonathan Stern, and Curtis Gwinn	2nd Man On The Moon; Abominable Pictures	Greenlit as an online series titled Filthy Preppy Teens by Fullscreen.	2013
Coffin Dodgers	Dave Jeser and Matt Silverstein	Double Hemm	Released on Adult Swim's official website as an "internet-only exclusive".	2013
Rolling with Dad	David Katzenberg and Seth Grahame-Smith	KatzSmith Productions; Bento Box Entertainment		2013
Sperm Boat	Matt Harrigan	Flannypop; Thank You, Brain! Productions		2013
Hellbenders	Chris O'Neill and Zach Hadel	N/A	The pilot was dropped before production ever completed.	2013
The Team Unicorn Saturday Action Fun Hour!	Clare Grant, Rileah Vanderbilt, Seth Green, and Matthew Senreich	Stoop!d Monkey; Stoopid Buddy Stoodios; Danger Maiden Productions	Shown as a sneak peek at San Diego Comic-Con's Nerd HQ, and never released or aired since then.	2014
Youth Large	Nathan Barnatt, Seth Barnatt, and Paul B. Cummings	Barnatt Brothers Productions; New Wave Entertainment		2014
Fartcopter (Note: Part of Infomercials.)	Rob Huebel	Abominable Pictures		2014
Harold & Kumar	Jon Hurwitz and Hayden Schlossberg (original live-action films)	Lionsgate Television; Bento Box Entertainment	Unfinished and never aired.	2014
The Pound Hole	Daniel Weidenfeld (d): Daniel Weidenfeld and Doug Lussenhop	Working For Monsters; Douggpound; Rent Now Productions		2015
Doble Fried	Matt Furie	PFFR; Titmouse, Inc.	There was no updates to whether the pilot was finished or not, or aired since then.	2015
Gigglefudge, USA!	Nicholas Maier and Dimitri Simakis	PFFR; Everything Is Terrible! FishBowl Worldwide Media	Also a part for Infomercials.	2016
The Hindenburg Explodes!	Rob Corddry, Josh Perilo, and Jonathan Stern	Abominable Pictures; The Corrdry Company; Timers Head Productions		2016
The Mark Lembeck Technique	Adam Lustick	Scrubble; Alive and Kicking, Inc.		2016
Scavengers	Joseph Bennett and Charles Huettner	Titmouse, Inc.	Greenlit by Max as Scavengers Reign.	2016
Bad Guys	Nick Giovannetti and Paul Scheer	Bento Box Entertainment; Geezus; 2nd Man On The Moon	Episode: "Watch the Throne".	2016
Chuck Deuce	Matt Iles, Chioke "Stretch" McCoy, and Lars Kenseth	ShadowMachine		2018
Trap Universe	J.J. Villard	Villard Film; Titmouse, Inc.		2018
Dayworld	Cole Kush and Jay Weingarten	Abso Lutely Productions; Daytime Studio		2018
Art Prison	Tom Kauffman and Paul Isakson	Yum Yum; Starburns Industries		2018
Ole Bud's ANU Football Weekly	Chris "CP" Powell and Chip Hall	Dutch Treat Productions; Alive and Kicking, Inc.		2018
Di Bibl	John Lee and Kytten Janae	PFFR; Daisy Studio		2019
Lusty Crest	Kati Skelton	It's Grim; Factual Productions		2020
Bad Manners	Todd Rohal	PFFR; TUbb; Alive and Kicking, Inc.		2020
The Animated Adventures of Jack Decker	Tim Heidecker and Gregg Turkington	Abso Lutely Productions; Copernicus Studios		2020
Skeleton Landlord	Doug Bleichner and Sam Wagstaff	N/A		2020
Macbeth with Dinosaurs	Matt Foster and Dave W. Campbell	N/A		2021
Learning With Pibby	Dodge Greenley	Cartoon Network Studios		2021
I'm the Mayor of Bimmi Gardens	Pat Bishop, Chris Fleming, Matt Ingebreston, and Jake Weisman	No Joe; Incredible Success; Alive and Kicking, Inc.		2021
Eggland	Conner O'Malley, Brendan O'Hare, and Cole Kush	Irony Point; Grin Machine		2022
Yenor	Matt Maiellaro and Jim Fortier	N/A		2023
Mystery Cuddlers	Pendleton Ward and Jack Pendarvis	N/A		2024

=== Specials ===
==== Stand-alones ====
Title	Creator(s)	Co-production(s)	Notes	Year(s)
Infomercials: For-Profit Online University (2013); Live Forever as You Are Now with Alan Resnick (2013); Too Many Cooks (2014)	Various	(See List of specials)		2009–present
Freaknik: The Musical	Carl Jones and Nick Weidenfeld	Nappy Boy Entertainment; Titmouse, Inc.	Retooled version of 2007 pilot That Crook'd 'Sipp.	2010
Earth Ghost	George Lowe	N/A	Special and updated version of the 2007 pilot Lowe Country. Being premiered on April 1, Adult Swim used it as part of their annual April Fools' Day prank.	2011
The Greatest Event in Television History	Adam Scott and Naomi Scott	Gettin' Rad; Electric Soup Productions (Special from 2 to 4)	Four specials have been produced.	2012–14
Dinner with Friends with Brett Gelman and Friends	Brett Gelman and Jason Woliner	Abso Lutely Productions		2014
Dinner with Family with Brett Gelman and Brett Gelman's Family	Brett Gelman and Jason Woliner	Abso Lutely Productions		2015
The Adult Swim Golf Classic: Daly vs. Scott	Jon Daly	J.O.N. Alive and Kicking, Inc.	An "extended" version of this special has been released on Adult Swim's official website, and production is sponsored by Arby's.	2016
Dinner in America with Brett Gelman	Brett Gelman and Jason Woliner	Abso Lutely Productions		2016
Mr. Neighbor's House	Jesse Falcon, Brian Huskey, and Jason Mantzoukas	El Zombie, Inc. Mantzoukas; Marimacha; The Corddry Company; Alive and Kicking, Inc.	Two specials have been produced.	2016–18
Joe Pera Helps You Find the Perfect Christmas Tree	Joe Pera	Chestnut Walnut Unlimited; Rent Now Productions		2016
Mother, May I Dance with Mary Jane's Fist?	Mary Elizabeth Ellis and Artemis Pebdani	Abso Lutely Productions; Bounce Castle	Also known as Mother, May I Dance with Mary Jane's Fist?: A Lifetone Original Movie for Adult Swim.	2018
Soft Focus	Jena Friedman	CNT Productions; Factual Productions	Also known as Soft Focus with Jena Friedman. Two specials have been produced.	2018–19
Hunky Boys Go Ding-Dong	Zack Carlson, Bryan Connolly, and Todd Rohal	PFFR; Steak Beef Bee Jamesandwich Beef Version; Factual Productions	Two specials have been produced. Episodes: "Don't Die Alone" and "Terrific Journey".	2018–19
Smalls	Various	Various	A program to showcase short films by independent animators. Haha, You Clowns was picked up as a full series after the pilot aired as part of the program.	2018–present
Adult Swim Yule Log	Casper Kelly	Media Team; Fried Society	Also known as The Fireplace.	2022
Adult Swim Yule Log 2: Branchin' Out	Casper Kelly	Media Team; Fried Society		2024
The Elephant	Rebecca Sugar; Ian Jones-Quartey; Pendleton Ward; Patrick McHale	Titmouse, Inc.	Animated television special.	2025

==== TV series-related ====
Title	Co-production(s)	Notes	Year
Space Ghost Coast to Coast: The Mask	N/A	Under Cartoon Network Productions.	1994
A Space Ghost Christmas	N/A	Under Cartoon Network Productions.	1994
Space Ghost Coast to Coast: Jonny Quest	N/A	Under Cartoon Network Productions.	1996
Brak Presents the Brak Show Starring Brak	N/A	Predecessor to The Brak Show.	2000
Adult Swim Brain Trust	N/A	Originally unnamed and dubbed Anime Talk Show due to it airing after the premiere of Perfect Hair Forever; later renamed after being uploaded to Adult Swim's YouTube channel.	2004
Tom Goes to the Mayor: A Look Behind the Scenes	Abso Lutely Productions	Behind the scenes look for Tom Goes to the Mayor.	2005
12 oz. Mouse Spider-Man Special		Alternate version of the episode "Spider" from 12 oz. Mouse	2005
Robot Chicken's Christmas Special	ShadowMachine; Stoop!d Monkey; Sony Pictures Digital		2005
Robot Chicken: Star Wars	ShadowMachine; Stoop!d Monkey; Sony Pictures Digital; Lucasfilm		2007
Robot Chicken's Half-Assed Christmas Special	ShadowMachine; Stoop!d Monkey; Sony Pictures Digital		2007
The Young Person's Guide to History	Funny Garbage	Spin-off special of Saul of the Mole Men.	2008
The Xtacles	70/30 Productions	Only two episodes were produced and aired as a single special. Spin-off of Frisky Dingo.	2008
Robot Chicken: Star Wars Episode II	ShadowMachine Films; Stoop!d Monkey; Lucasfilm; Sony Pictures Digital		2008
Robot Chicken: Star Wars Episode 2.5	ShadowMachine Films; Stoop!d Monkey; Lucasfilm; Sony Pictures Digital		2009
Robot Chicken's Full-Assed Christmas Special	ShadowMachine Films; Stoop!d Monkey; Sony Pictures Digital	Also known as Dear Consumer.	2009
Tim and Eric Awesome Show, Great Job!: Chrimbus Special	Abso Lutely Productions	Spin-off special of Tim and Eric Awesome Show, Great Job!	2010
Robot Chicken: Star Wars Episode III	Stoop!d Monkey; ShadowMachine Films; Lucasfilm; Sony Pictures Digital		2010
Robot Chicken's DP Christmas Special	Stoop!d Monkey; ShadowMachine Films; Sony Pictures Digital		2010
Robot Chicken DC Comics Special	Stoop!d Monkey; Stoopid Buddy Stoodios; DC Entertainment; Sony Pictures Television; Warner Bros. Animation		2012
The NTSF:SD:SUV:HISS Infomercial	2nd Man On The Moon; Abominable Pictures		2012
Beforel Orel: Trust	Starburns Industries	Prequel special to Moral Orel.	2012
NTSF:SD:SUV:: – Christmas Activity	2nd Man On The Moon; Abominable Pictures		2012
Swords, Knives, Very Sharp Objects and Cutlery	2nd Man On The Moon; Abominable Pictures		2012
Robot Chicken's ATM Christmas Special	Stoop!d Monkey; Stoopid Buddy Stoodios; Sony Pictures Television		2012
The Eric Andre New Year's Eve Spooktacular	Abso Lutely Productions; Naked Faces; Sick Duck Productions		2012
NTSF:SD:SUV:: – Inertia	2nd Man On The Moon; Abominable Pictures		2013
Dan Deacon: U.S.A.	Million Monkeys Inc.	Special episode of Off The Air. Also known as Dan Deacon Special.	2013
Metalocalypse: The Doomstar Requiem	Titmouse, Inc.	Also known as Metalocalypse: The Doomstar Requiem – A Klok Opera.	2013
Robot Chicken: Born Again Virgin Christmas Special	Stoop!d Monkey; Stoopid Buddy Stoodios; Sony Pictures Television		2013
Robot Chicken DC Comics Special 2: Villains in Paradise	Stoop!d Monkey; Stoopid Buddy Stoodios; DC Entertainment; Sony Pictures Television Warner Bros. Animation		2014
The Robot Chicken Bitch Pudding Special	Stoop!d Monkey; Stoopid Buddy Stoodios; Sony Pictures Television		2014
Robot Chicken: Lots of Holidays Special	Stoop!d Monkey; Stoopid Buddy Stoodios; Sony Pictures Television	Also known as The Robot Chicken Lots of Holidays (but Don't Worry Christmas Is Still in There Too So Pull the Stick Out of Your Ass Fox News) Special.	2014
Bagboy	Abso Lutely Productions	Spin-off special of both Tim and Eric Awesome Show, Great Job! and Check It Out! with Dr. Steve Brule.	2015
Robot Chicken DC Comics Special III: Magical Friendship	Stoop!d Monkey; Stoopid Buddy Stoodios; DC Entertainment; Sony Pictures Television Warner Bros. Animation		2015
Tim & Eric's Bedtime Stories: Sauce Boy	Abso Lutely Productions		2015
Black Jesus: A Very Special Christmas in Compton	5 Mutts Productions; Triage Entertainment		2015
Tim & Eric's Bedtime Stories: Tornado	Abso Lutely Productions		2015
The Robot Chicken Christmas Special: The X-Mas United	Stoop!d Monkey; Stoopid Buddy Stoodios; Sony Pictures Television		2015
Awesome 10 Year Anniversary Version, Great Job?	Abso Lutely Productions	10th anniversary special to Tim and Eric Awesome Show, Great Job!.	2017
The Robot Chicken Walking Dead Special: Look Who's Walking	Stoop!d Monkey; Stoopid Buddy Stoodios; Sony Pictures Television		2017
Check It Out! with Scott Clam	Abso Lutely Productions	Follow-up to Check It Out! with Dr. Steve Brule.	2017
Freshly Baked: The Robot Chicken Santa Claus Pot Cookie Freakout Special – Special Edition	Stoop!d Monkey; Stoopid Buddy Stoodios; Sony Pictures Television		2017
Squidbillies: The War on the War on Christmas	N/A		2017
Eric Andre Does Paris	Sick Duck Productions; The Kitao Boyz; Delirio Films		2018
Bushworld Adventures	N/A	Rick and Morty parody written, directed and animated by Michael Cusack.	2018
12 oz. Mouse: Invictus	N/A		2018
Harvey Birdman: Attorney General	11:36 Entertainment		2018
KRFT Punk's Political Party	Abso Lutely Productions; Full Clarity; Sick Duck Productions	Spin-off special of The Eric Andre Show.	2019
Robot Chicken's Santa's Dead (Spoiler Alert) Holiday Murder Thing Special	Stoop!d Monkey; Stoopid Buddy Stoodios; Sony Pictures Television		2019
The Bleepin' Robot Chicken Archie Comics Special	Stoop!d Monkey; Stoopid Buddy Stoodios; Sony Pictures Television; Archie Comics		2021
Happy Russian Deathdog Dolloween 2 U	Stoop!d Monkey; Stoopid Buddy Stoodios		2021
King Star King!/!/!/	Villard Film; Rough Draft Studios	Sequel to King Star King.	2023
Ballmastrz: Rubicon	PFFR; C.C.K. Rad; Studio 4°C	Sequel to Ballmastrz: 9009.	2023
The Robot Chicken Self-Discovery Special	Stoop!d Monkey; Stoopid Buddy Stoodios; Sony Pictures Television		2025

=== Blocks ===
Title	Notes	Started
Cartoon Planet	Originally ended in 1998, but revived in 2012. Revived block ended in 2014.	1995–1998 (1st run); 2012–2014 (2nd run)
Toonami	Originally ended in 2008 on Cartoon Network, but revived in 2012 on Adult Swim.	1997–2008 (1st run); 2012–present (2nd run)
Saturday Video Entertainment System		2003–2004
Miguzi		2004–2007
Checkered Past	Aired programs from Cartoon Network in the 1990s–2000s	2023–2025 (1st run); 2025–present (2nd run)

=== Feature films ===
Year	Title	Co-production	Distributor
2007	Aqua Teen Hunger Force Colon Movie Film for Theaters	Radical Axis	First Look Pictures
2019	Mister America	Abso Lutely Productions	Magnolia Pictures
In Development
TBA	Untitled Rick and Morty film	Harmonious Claptrap	Warner Bros. Pictures

==== Direct-to-video films ====
Year	Title	Co-production	Distributor
2022	Aqua Teen Forever: Plantasm	Bento Box Atlanta	Warner Bros. Home Entertainment
2023	The Venture Bros.: Radiant Is the Blood of the Baboon Heart	Astro Base GO! Titmouse, Inc.	Warner Bros. Home Entertainment
2023	Metalocalypse: Army of the Doomstar	Titmouse, Inc.	Warner Bros. Home Entertainment

=== Future series in development ===
Title	Creator(s)	Co-production(s)	Notes	Premiere
Heist Brothers	Genndy Tartakovsky	Cartoon Network Studios	Originally titled Heist Safari	TBA
My Two Cars	Dan Licata and Joe Pera	Green Street Pictures; Chestnut Walnut Unlimited		TBA

== Other ==
=== Games ===
This list is only for video games licensed by Williams Street Games; see Adult Swim Games for other video games produced after the label's dissolution.

- Aqua Teen Hunger Force Zombie Ninja Pro-Am (2007)
- Harvey Birdman: Attorney at Law (2008)

=== Music ===
Williams Street formed their own music label, Williams Street Records. The label was created after Jason DeMarco, Adult Swim's vice president of strategic marketing and promotions, worked on Danger Doom, a project with Danger Mouse and MF Doom in 2005. Danger Mouse had previously worked on the music for Toonami and wanted to do an album that sampled that work. The group suggested the idea to Mike Lazzo; the project was successful. Williams Street Records now releases a majority of the music related to their shows. The label is managed by DeMarco.

== Homages ==
1065, the street number for Williams Street, is also the hull number for FishCenter Live's USS FishCenterprise (a parody of the original Star Trek's USS Enterprise).

== See also ==
- List of programs broadcast by Adult Swim
- Adult animation
- Cartoon Network Studios
- List of animation studios owned by Warner Bros. Discovery
