= Paid Programming =

Paid programming may refer to:

- Infomercial, a program-length television commercial
- Brokered programming, a broadcast whose airtime is paid by the show producer
- Paid Programming (TV pilot), 2009

== See also ==
- PaidProgramming, a 2013 album by Bones
