= Ben O'Brien =

American comedian and filmmaker

Ben O'Brien (born November 4, 1984) is an American comedian and filmmaker from Baltimore, Maryland. They are a member of the Wham City arts collective and founding member of Wham City Comedy. They have directed videos for Adult Swim and Merge Records. They are the co-creator of the web series Showbeast (2006–2013) and they manage and perform with Wham City Comedy (2010–present). The website Brightest Young Things posted this about Wham City Comedy "...you should make a point to see them, as they’re super funny and doing DIY comedy like few others."

Most prominently they have co-created multiple short films and live performance shows on Adult Swim along with Alan Resnick, Cricket Arrison, and Robby Rackleff, including Live Forever as You Are Now with Alan Resnick, Unedited Footage of a Bear, and This House Has People in It which aired on Adult Swim the week of March 14, 2016.

== Life and education ==
O'Brien was born and raised in Oswego, New York, and went on to attend college at SUNY Purchase where they met Alan Resnick. In 2008 they moved to Baltimore, Maryland where they maintained a studio at the Copycat Building and joined Wham City, an arts and music collective.

== Live performance ==
Ben performs live, doing standup comedy and multimedia performances with their group Wham City Comedy, and has toured with found footage group Everything is Terrible! and electronic musician Dan Deacon. In April 2015 they began performing as Earth Universe, a spiritual guru who claims to be the reincarnation of Emanuel Bronner.

== Video work ==
Their notable projects include multiple music videos for Dan Deacon, a music video for the band Wye Oak for the song "The Tower," the short films for Adult Swim, and their self-produced web series "Showbeast".

== Personal life ==
O'Brien is a member of the Democratic Socialists of America.
