= Star Trek: Very Short Treks =

Series of promotional short films

- Genre: Science fiction; Comedy
- Created by: Casper Kelly
- Based on: Star Trek: The Animated Series by Gene Roddenberry
- Country of origin: United States
- Original language: English
- No. of seasons: 1
- No. of episodes: 5

Production
- Executive producers: Casper Kelly; Ashley Kohler
- Running time: 2–5 minutes
- Production companies: Secret Hideout; Roddenberry Entertainment; CBS Studios; Awesome Inc

Original release
- Network: StarTrek.com; YouTube
- Release: September 8 – October 4, 2023

Related
- Star Trek TV series; Star Trek: The Animated Series

Star Trek: Very Short Treks (stylized as very Short Treks) is a series of promotional short films created by Casper Kelly for the 50th anniversary of Star Trek: The Animated Series. It consists of five non-canon shorts that are two to five minutes long. They feature characters and settings from all previous Star Trek series.

The series was announced in July 2023. Kelly was encouraged to push the boundaries of humor for the franchise. The animation was provided by Awesome Inc and is in the same style as The Animated Series. Many Star Trek cast members returned to reprise their roles, with several comedians also hired to provide voices.

Very Short Treks were released on StarTrek.com and YouTube from September to October 2023.

== Episodes ==
No.	Title	Directed by	Written by	Original release date
1	"Skin a Cat"	Aaron Hawkins	Casper Kelly	September 8, 2023
Amidst a Klingon attack, the USS Enterprise's captain keeps accidentally insulting his crew members by using figures of speech they find offensive. Cast : Ethan Peck as Spock; Pete Holmes as the captain; Cristina Milizia as M'Ress, the dream woman, and the Knickersonian; Bonnie Gordon as the computer; Eric Bauza as the Antedian, Ass Face, and Screwhead
2	"Holiday Party"	Aaron Hawkins	Claire Friedman	September 13, 2023
At a First Contact Day party on the Enterprise, Spock is in charge of entertainment and showcases what he calls a blooper reel, which disturbs the crew. Cast : Bruce Horak as Hemmer; Ethan Peck as Spock; Bonnie Gordon as additional voices; Eric Bauza as additional voices; Celia Rose Gooding as Nyota Uhura; Gia Sandhu as T'Pring; Doug Jones as Saru
3	"Worst Contact"	Aaron Hawkins	Casper Kelly	September 20, 2023
William Riker and Beverly Crusher initiate first contact with a new alien species with particularly gross customs. Cast : Jonathan Frakes as William Riker; Dana Snyder as Bragu; Gates McFadden as Beverly Crusher; Sarah Sherman as Mucara
4	"Holograms, All the Way Down"	Aaron Hawkins	Aaron J. Waltke	September 27, 2023
Situations are revealed to be holodeck simulations within holodeck simulations to the point of crashing. Cast : Connor Trinneer as Trip Tucker; Jonathan Frakes as William Riker; Armin Shimerman as Quark; Noel Wells as D'Vana Tendi; Angus Imrie as Zero; George Takei as Hikaru Sulu; Doug Jones as Saru; Bruce Horak as Hemmer; Ethan Phillips as Neelix; Bonnie Gordon as the computer
5	"Walk, Don't Run"	Aaron Hawkins	Casper Kelly	October 4, 2023
D'Vana Tendi hosts a celebration of Star Trek: The Animated Series' 50th anniversary which quickly devolves into an insane musical number. Cast : Noël Wells as D'Vana Tendi; Carlos Alazraqui as Scotty; Cristina Milizia as M'Ress; George Takei as Hikaru Sulu; Jonathan Frakes as William Riker

== Production ==
Star Trek: The Animated Celebration, a celebration of the 50th anniversary of Star Trek: The Animated Series, was announced in July 2023 at San Diego Comic-Con. As part of the celebration, CBS Studios was set to release five promotional shorts from creative consultant Casper Kelly later in 2023. Kelly announced the shorts alongside John Van Citters, CBS's vice president of Star Trek brand development. The shorts were revealed to be called Star Trek: very Short Treks in September. This is a reference to the existing shorts series Star Trek: Short Treks, though, unlike that series, very Short Treks is not part of official Star Trek canon.

Kelly was first involved in Star Trek when producer Alex Kurtzman brought him in to work on Short Treks. For very Short Treks, Kurtzman was inspired by Kelly's work on a series of Wonder Twins shorts for Adult Swim. He encouraged Kelly to push the boundaries of humor for the franchise in the shorts, saying, "I want you to do the weird stuff you do, but with Star Trek". Kelly said very Short Treks would be more experimental and "fucked up" than the animated comedy series Star Trek: Lower Decks. He received approval from Lower Decks creator Mike McMahan for some elements of the shorts. Ten shorts were written but only five were produced; Kelly expressed interest in making the other five in the future. The animation was provided by Awesome Inc, who Kelly worked with on the short Too Many Cooks, and done in the style of The Animated Series.

When the shorts were first announced, Kelly and Van Citters said Star Trek actors Jonathan Frakes (William Riker), Doug Jones (Saru), and Armin Shimerman (Quark) would be reprising their roles. Additional returning cast members were announced in September: Ethan Peck as Spock, Gates McFadden as Dr. Beverly Crusher, Celia Rose Gooding as Uhura, Connor Trinneer as Trip Tucker, Bruce Horak as Hemmer, Noël Wells as Tendi, and George Takei as Sulu. Takei was initially ambivalent about returning for the shorts, until Kelly wrote him a "fan letter" that won him over. Kelly cast comedians who had not worked on Star Trek before to fill the other roles.

== Release ==
The first short premiered on StarTrek.com and the Star Trek YouTube channel on September 8, 2023, which is known as Star Trek Day. The other four shorts were released weekly through October 4. An additional episode, "The Making of very Short Treks with Casper Kelly", was released on October 10 and explores the making of the shorts.

== Tie-in media ==
Kelly was also asked to write a comic book for the celebration. He originally thought to adapt one of the unproduced scripts before deciding to write an original story. Star Trek: The Animated Celebration Presents The Scheimer Barrier was announced alongside the shorts in July 2023. It was also released on StarTrek.com on September 8, with physical copies from IDW Publishing available at New York Comic Con in October.
