= Tim & Eric's Bedtime Stories =

Television series

- Also known as: Bedtime Stories
- Genre: Comedy horror Surreal humor Dark comedy Anthology
- Created by: Tim & Eric
- Country of origin: United States
- Original language: English
- No. of seasons: 2
- No. of episodes: 13 (and 1 pilot and 2 specials)

Production
- Camera setup: Single-camera setup
- Running time: 11 minutes 22 minutes (select episodes)
- Production companies: Abso Lutely Productions; Williams Street

Original release
- Network: Adult Swim
- Release: October 31, 2013
- Release: September 18, 2014 – October 1, 2017

Tim & Eric's Bedtime Stories (also known as Bedtime Stories) is an American comedy horror anthology television series on Adult Swim. Tim & Eric's Bedtime Stories was created by Tim Heidecker and Eric Wareheim of the comedy duo Tim & Eric, who have been working with the network for several years with various shows and projects. The pilot episode aired on October 31, 2013, and the series officially premiered on September 18, 2014.

== Production ==
According to the network, the series would mark a stylistic departure from the duo's previous Adult Swim show, Tim and Eric Awesome Show, Great Job!, instead being formatted as an anthology series. Initial reports indicated that the series would have a quarter-hour running time. Reviewers, the network and Heidecker have commented that the series is inspired by The Twilight Zone, with the latter stating they will explore "different genres and different tropes" in the anthology format.

The series' pilot aired midnight, October 31, 2013, as a Halloween special. According to Heidecker, the pilot was produced in the same year that it aired, and the show had not been produced yet, waiting to start production toward the end of the year.

On May 7, 2015, two new half-hour episodes were announced to be in production. They aired in the fall of 2015.

On June 16, 2016, Tim Heidecker announced in an interview that Season 2, consisting of at least six full 30 minute episodes, would be aired in 2017.

Season 2 premiered on September 10, 2017. On October 3, 2018, Heidecker implied on Twitter that a third season was unlikely. As of December 2023, there has been no announcement of a third season.

== Episodes ==
Season	Episodes	Originally released	
Season	Episodes	First released	Last released
Pilot		October 31, 2013	
1	7	September 18, 2014	October 30, 2014
Thanksgiving Special		November 6, 2015	
Christmas Special		December 4, 2015	
2	6	September 10, 2017	October 1, 2017

=== Pilot (2013) ===
Title	Directed by	Written by	Original release date	US viewers (millions)
"Haunted House"	Tim Heidecker & Eric Wareheim	Tim Heidecker & Eric Wareheim	October 31, 2013	1.268
In order to collect their rich grandfather's inheritance, Tim, Eric & Zach must move to his haunted house for the rest of their lives. (Guest stars: Zach Galifianakis and John Heard)

=== Season 1 (2014) ===
No. overall	No. in season	Title	Directed by	Written by	Original release date	US viewers (millions)
1	1	"Hole"	Tim Heidecker & Eric Wareheim	Tim Heidecker & Eric Wareheim	September 18, 2014	1.152
Family man Dennis "Murph" Murphy (Eric) moves next door to Brenner (Tim), a friendly bully who torments Murph for declining his offer to hang out.
2	2	"Toes"	Tim Heidecker & Eric Wareheim	Tim Heidecker & Eric Wareheim	September 25, 2014	N/A
Detective Miller (M. Emmet Walsh) confronts toe-removal specialist Dr. Stork (Bob Odenkirk) about some troubling inconsistencies with a medical waste investigation. (Guest stars Gillian Jacobs)
3	3	"The Bathroom Boys"	Tim Heidecker & Eric Wareheim	Tim Heidecker & Eric Wareheim	October 2, 2014	0.827
Tim, Eric and Zach are three weird men who work as attendants and secretly live in the men's public restroom of the Stanton Building, where one day they run embarrassingly low on mints. Zach has a chance encounter at the candy store during his refill run, leading to a risky triple date with the Bathroom Boys and three sisters from England. (Guest stars Zach Galifianakis, Lauren Cohan)
4	4	"Angel Boy"	Tim Heidecker & Eric Wareheim	Tim Heidecker & Eric Wareheim	October 9, 2014	1.003
Before his son Patrick's Sweet 17th birthday party, Dan Dimler (Eric) is visited by Scotty Andrews (Tim), a hydrophobic young man who sells Dan his new DVD and enraptures him with his divine singing voice.
5	5	"Roommates"	Tim Heidecker & Eric Wareheim	Tim Heidecker & Eric Wareheim	October 16, 2014	0.843
Hollywood actor and talented mixologist Franklin Bing (Tim) welcomes fellow actor and out of work barista Tony K. Dort (Eric) as his new roommate. Their initial friendship becomes increasingly strained as Franklin learns of Tony's erotic misadventures.
6	6	"The Endorsement"	Tim Heidecker & Eric Wareheim	Tim Heidecker & Eric Wareheim	October 23, 2014	0.817
In order to protect his reputation and avoid low company, actor Jason Schwartzman strictly avoids product endorsement deals until his agent proposes a novel arrangement: the ad will never be seen in the US, and the entire photo shoot will take place while he is asleep. The endorsement appears to work great until Jason realizes that the terms of the arrangement were violated. (Guest stars Jimmy Kimmel, Shira Lazar, Dawnn Lewis, Jason Schwartzman, Brent Weinbach)
7	7	"Baby"	Tim Heidecker & Eric Wareheim	Tim Heidecker & Eric Wareheim	October 30, 2014	N/A
Jordan Terp (John C. Reilly) answers an ad for a baby-based personal development program but is instead robbed of all his possessions by a pair of con artist brothers (Tim & Eric) posing as creepy life coaches. (Additional guest star Laurie Metcalf as Gabrielle, the waitress)

=== Thanksgiving Special (2015) ===
Title	Directed by	Written by	Original release date	US viewers (millions)
"Sauce Boy"	Tim Heidecker & Eric Wareheim	Tim Heidecker & Eric Wareheim	November 6, 2015	0.847
Goodfella Bobby Balogna (Tim) helps struggling addict Gary Royce (Eric) overcome his debilitating addiction, but the cure comes at a price as Gary finds himself indentured to the mob.

=== Christmas Special (2015) ===
Title	Directed by	Written by	Original release date	US viewers (millions)
"Tornado"	Tim Heidecker & Eric Wareheim	Tim Heidecker & Eric Wareheim	December 4, 2015	N/A
A tornado devastates St. Charles County and rips Matt's parents' septic tank out of the ground, causing it to land on the church-run county hospital and spill the copious collected semen from his teen years all over the place. Matt must confront Father Krang to re-bury his past. (Guest stars Lance Reddick, Kurtwood Smith, Zach Gilford, Rosa Salazar, Jamey Sheridan, Cynthia Stevenson)

=== Season 2 (2017) ===
No. overall	No. in season	Title	Directed by	Written by	Original release date	US viewers (millions)
8	1	"Baklava"	Tim Heidecker & Eric Wareheim	Tim Heidecker & Eric Wareheim	September 10, 2017	N/A
Fazoli piano store salesman Barry “Big Bear” (Eric) must sell pianos to pay his recently kidnapped daughter Janey's (Summera Howell) ransom and save the city of Dallas, but his mission is frustrated by the constant interruptions and questionable judgment of his neurotic boss, Mr. Crown (Tim).
9	2	"The Duke"	Tim Heidecker & Eric Wareheim	Tim Heidecker & Eric Wareheim	September 10, 2017	N/A
At the absurd Pamungo Casino, where scratcher lottery tickets are the game of choice, Brian loses his wife but gains a dad, The Duke (Ray Wise)—a mysterious and hypnotic stranger. (Guest Stars Rhea Perlman (misspelled "Pearlman" in the credits) as Maureen, and Jorge Garcia as Brian)
10	3	"Angel Man"	Tim Heidecker & Eric Wareheim	Tim Heidecker & Eric Wareheim	September 17, 2017	N/A
In this sequel to Season One's "Angel Boy", Dan Dimler (Eric) escapes from a mental institution to see Scotty Andrews (Tim), who now works at an underground night club while perfecting his new musical style. Note: Following the initial airing of this episode, a double-length "Extended Cut" was released exclusively on Adult Swim's website.
11	4	"The Demotion"	Tim Heidecker & Eric Wareheim	Tim Heidecker & Eric Wareheim	September 24, 2017	0.98
After air traffic controller Will Schiffler's (Will Forte) sleep deprivation costs hundreds of lives in plane crashes, he turns to unorthodox sleep therapy techniques, with Tim and Eric as the therapists. Guest starring Sarah Sutherland as Dayna, Will's coworker and love interest, and Fred Willard as Dan, his supervisor.
12	5	"Squat"	Tim Heidecker & Eric Wareheim	Tim Heidecker & Eric Wareheim	September 24, 2017	0.81
Slovenly and overweight IT technician Forrest Gumb (Tim) is convinced to try out an automated and potentially deadly "AUTOGYM" health club. The CG trainer "Trent" is voiced and portrayed in animation by Eric. The disturbing experience at the gym makes him question his own existence. Guest starring Kris Lofton, Emily Rowan, and Emily Berry.
13	6	"Butter"	Tim Heidecker & Eric Wareheim	Tim Heidecker & Eric Wareheim	October 1, 2017	0.96
Southern butter saleswomen, Belle (Tim), and her wife, Bonnie (Eric), adopt various children from around the world to assist in their butter production and shop upkeep. A wealthy businessman, Jackson, claims to want to educate Belle's favorite child Mongo and offers a large financial donation to their business in exchange for custody of Mongo. After they agree to the transaction, Belle begins having second thoughts.
