= Live Forever as You Are Now with Alan Resnick =

2013 television special by Ben O'Brien and Alan Resnick

- Genre: Satire; Alternative comedy
- Created by: Ben O'Brien; Alan Resnick
- Written by: Ben O'Brien; Dina Kelberman
- Directed by: Ben O'Brien; Alan Resnick
- Presented by: Dan Deacon
- Starring: Alan Resnick
- Narrated by: Connor M. Kizer
- Composers: Dan Deacon; Drew Swinburne
- Country of origin: United States
- Original language: English

Production
- Executive producers: Alan Resnick; Ben O'Brien; Dan Deacon; Dave Hughes
- Cinematography: Noah Collier
- Editors: Alan Resnick; Ben O'Brien
- Running time: 11 minutes
- Production companies: AB Video Solutions, LLC; Williams Street

Original release
- Network: Adult Swim
- Release: December 24, 2013

Related
- Infomercials

Live Forever as You Are Now with Alan Resnick is a television special written, created and directed by Alan Resnick and Ben O'Brien for Adult Swim, as part of the Infomercials series. The special is presented as a parody of self-help infomercials, advertising a four-step program for creating a digital avatar that acts as a backup of its host. The special is hosted by Alan Resnick as himself, and is presented by Dan Deacon. Both, along with O'Brien, are members of the Baltimore-based art collective Wham City, who co-produced the episode under their video production division, AB Video Solutions.

The special aired on December 24, 2013, at 4 a.m. on Cartoon Network's late-night programming block, Adult Swim. The special was viewed by 926,000 viewers and received a Nielsen household rating of 0.7. Critical reception was positive, with both the humor and the performances receiving praise.

== Summary ==
Alan Resnick (portrayed by himself), an emerging young tech expert and innovator, is introduced to the viewer. He tells the audience of his four-step program to create a digital avatar that acts as a backup of its host, granting "the secret to eternal life". He tells the audience of his past: two years ago, Resnick was banished to his couch after getting into an argument with his wife, Janet. That night he dreamt of himself in a foggy meadow with an attractive, nude young woman (portrayed by "MKNZ") who solicits him for sex. He initially refuses, but then changes his mind, but before they are able to do so, he is shot in the head by a nameless man (Ben O'Brien), which totally destroys his face. This gave him the idea to come up with a way to digitally back himself up. Two months pass, and he is able to create an "exact digital copy" of himself who calls himself "Teddy" (for unknown reasons). "Teddy", a floating avatar head, acts as the co-host for the remainder of the program, often interrupting Resnick's speech to talk about his "wife".

Resnick goes on to explain the four steps behind his process:

1. Subjects are instructed to look in a mirror every night for five hours and observe their facial features, sketching what they recall while in the dark; subjects are then instructed to hang up said drawings around their house.
2. The subject comes over to Resnick's house, where blindingly bright patterns are projected into their eyes and face while they spin around. These patterns will be "queered" by their head form, generating three-point axes, which are then "booleaned" to generate a three-dimensional mesh of their head. Resnick then goes on to explain the "uncanny valley", which leads him into his third step:
3. The avatars are put through a series of intensive "skin stress tests", including "ball tests", "wiggle tests" and "durability and tear testing".
4. Resnick comes into his subjects' house for two months to analyze their interests and personality types; he will ask "hundreds of personal questions" involving friends, furniture, romance, animals, food, events and touch. All the information will be scanned into the USB flash drive of the subject's computer, which makes the "brain" of their avatar.

Various testimonials are then given; a widower and "textbook salesman" Ryan Syrell (Steve Izant) tells of the reconstruction of his wife Morgan and the creation of his own avatar. Jordan Card, an elderly woman, is thrilled with her digital avatar, who only insists that their room "is too cold." Chester Gwazda (Caynen Couture), a young bedridden boy, says getting an avatar was his mother's (Michelle Word) idea, and is clearly dissatisfied with his avatar, which does not share his interests. Concluding his seminar, Resnick thanks his audience and "Teddy", who speaks again of the love for his wife, shown to be a pink morphing sphere. A frustrated Resnick scolds his creation and informs the audience that his avatar is autonomous, and that he is being manipulative and disappointing. He reminds the viewer to purchase his program through the following informational screen.

== Cast ==
- Alan Resnick as himself and "Teddy" (Note: Denotes a member of Wham City.)
- Dan Deacon as the presenter
- Meredith Moore as a crowd member
- Steve Izant as Ryan Syrell
- Caynen Couture as Chester Gwazda
- Jordan Card as a person on a stool
- Mason Ross as a person on a stool
- Dina Kelberman as a person on a stool
- Christopher Colletti as Resnick's double
- MKNZ as "Dream Woman"
- Ben O'Brien as "Man with Gun"
- Mimi Gillet as Jordan Card
- Thomas Colley as a stagehand
- Michelle Word as Chester's mother
- Connor Kizer as the narrator

== Production ==
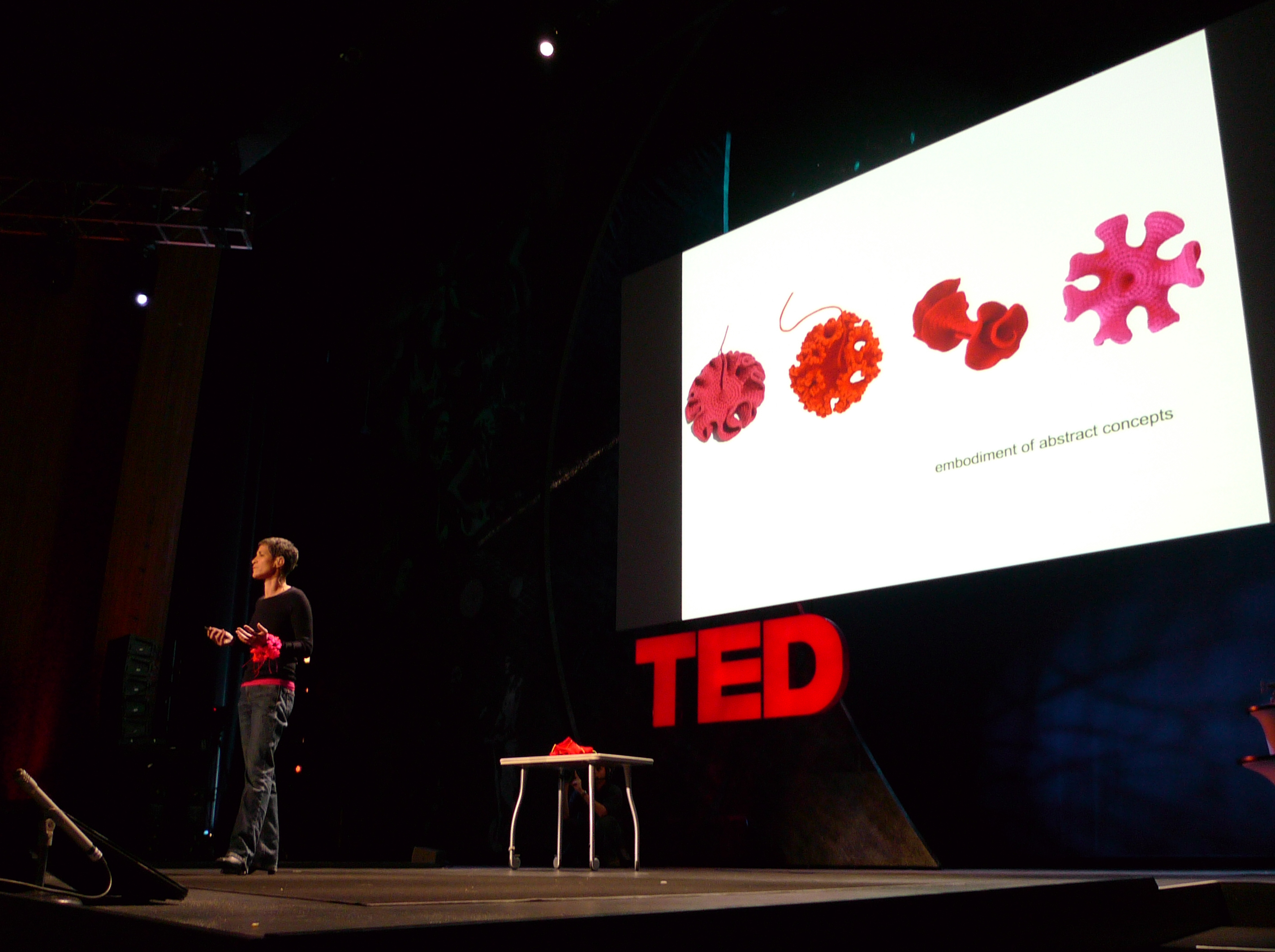
Resnick's skit, on which the special is based, is roughly modeled after TED Talks (example pictured).

The series was originally developed as a comedy sketch by Alan Resnick, as part of his comedy tours with the Baltimore-based art collective Wham City, best known for their work with Dan Deacon. The skit, first conceived in 2009 and roughly modeled after TED Talks, features Resnick telling the audience how to create a complete digital backup of himself. Long-time associate Ben O'Brien co-produced, directed and edited the special along with Resnick. In addition, both co-produced the episode under their video production division, AB Video Solutions. Resnick, along with set decorator Emma Alamo, transformed Resnick's house into the set of the special.

The collective had pitched a Wham City television sitcom to Adult Swim before, but according to Resnick, the network insisted that "no one would ever watch more than one episode." Resnick named Mr. Show with Bob and David, The Kids in the Hall and the Upright Citizens Brigade as influences on the special. Dave Hughes, creator of the series Off the Air, who had discussed with the group about developing a series, took note of Resnick's sketch and helped the collective develop it into an infomercial. After airing the special, Wham City featured the skit for their comedy tour of New York City. Resnick informed Network Awesome that they will probably not produce any more fake infomercials, and that O'Brien is working with the network to create something that viewers will "stumble on unintentionally."

== Broadcast and reception ==
Live Forever as You Are Now with Alan Resnick aired on Adult Swim on December 24, 2013, at 4 a.m. It was the third in a series of infomercial parodies broadcast by the network, succeeding Broomshakalaka and For-Profit Online University. The early-morning timeslot was chosen since infomercials usually air during such hours. The special was published onto Adult Swim's YouTube channel the same day. The special was viewed by 926,000 viewers and received a Nielsen household rating of 0.7, meaning that approximately 0.7 percent of households with a television watched it. A web chat allowing users to converse with "Teddy" was created for the network's website.

The special has received positive critical reception. In talking about Resnick with regards to the special, Baltimore City Paper's Baynard Woods wrote that it "combines the traditional kind-of-creepy positivity of the infomercial host with the creepy techno-utopian positivity of a TED Talk's technologist." He ultimately opined that the humor derived from "the disconnect between what Resnick claims—that his avatar is a complete backup of himself—and the reality that it is not at all like him and is, in fact, extremely limited." Ezra Lefko of What Weekly, another Baltimore-based publication, praised the special. In particular, he expressed his approval of seeing "success and national exposure for these talented artists." Lea McLellan of Mountain Xpress called it "hilarious" and "a good representation of their bizarre comedic stylings."

== See also ==
- Paid Programming
- You're Whole
