= Copycat Building =

Building in Maryland, United States

Coordinates: 39°18′24″N 76°36′43″W

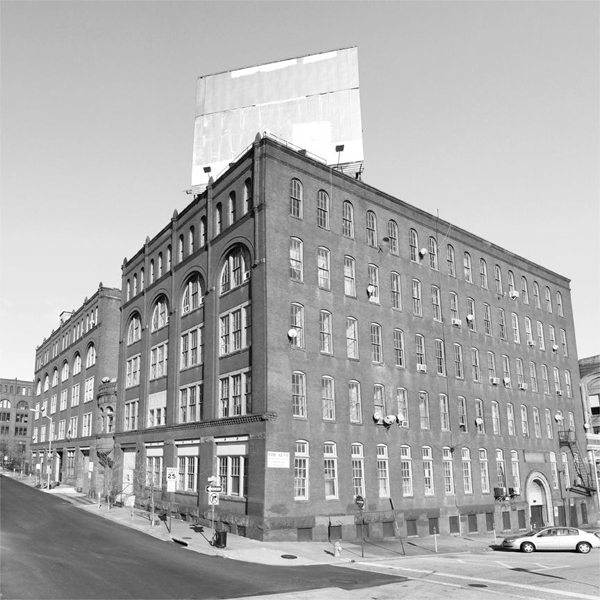
The Copycat Building shown from the corner of East Oliver Street and Guilford Ave.

The Copycat Building is a former manufacturing warehouse at 1501 Guilford Ave, Baltimore, Maryland, today used as an artists' studio and living space. Built in 1897, it is home to the city's creative class and a landmark of the Station North Arts and Entertainment District.

It earned the nickname "the Copycat" for a billboard advertising the Copy Cat printing company that stood on its roof for years. The building was purchased by Charles Lankford in 1983 for $225,000. At the time it housed a variety of light-industrial tenants, which Lankford sought to retain.

During the COVID-19 pandemic, the Copycat Building became a focal point of tenant-landlord conflict. Though state and national eviction moratoria prevented eviction proceedings against tenants, Lankford attempted to remove a number of tenants in arrears by refusing to renew month-to-month leases. Because Lankford operates the Copycat without the legally required licensing, tenants and state legal nonprofits challenged his right to relief in tenant holding over court. In December 2021, the Maryland Court of Appeals ruled in Lankford's favor, allowing him to displace tenants despite lacking a license in a blow tenant advocates have called "an 'earthquake' that could endanger tenants" throughout Maryland.” This ruling led to the passage of the Rental Licensing Accountability Act, which aims to block owners of unlicensed units from seeking relief in specialized tenant courts.

== Tenants ==
"After a while we decided, as an experiment, to take one floor and convert it into artist studios, since we were so close to Maryland Institute College of Art," Lankford says. "Over time, everybody started 'cheating'--instead of renting an apartment and a studio, they would save money by living in their studios." Lankford, who added a 40,000-square-foot (3,700 m^{2}) industrial building at 419 E. Oliver St. that has also come to house artists to his portfolio in 1983, says he has "never hidden" from the city that artists have been working and living in his buildings. But he has had run-ins with various cities agencies over its legality. As a first step to getting his buildings "legit," he launched his own campaign to change the area's zoning from industrial to residential three years ago—only to be told that such a move was illegal. "There was no mechanism to allow this type of change," Lankford says. "You couldn't go from industrial to residential."

— Brennen Jensen, "Industry to Easels", Baltimore City Paper

The Copycat Building was home to The Wham City Art's Collective, former home to Baltimore artist Dan Deacon, Blood Baby, Santa Dads, Videohipos, Ed Schrader, Jimmy Joe Roche, and others. In addition to hosting local and touring acts Wham City hosted live stage performances, including of their interpretation of Beauty And The Beast, and held the first Whartscape Festival in the building in 2006. The related group Wham City Comedy also maintains a studio at the Copycat, where filmmakers and comedians Ben O'Brien and Alan Resnick produce and direct works, including the infomercial parody Live Forever as You Are Now with Alan Resnick, which was produced for Adult Swim. The Copycat Building also housed Social Services Recording Studio and the offices of local label Morphius (Morphius relocated in 2002). Both businesses had practice spaces hosting local bands the Uniform, LandSpeedRecord!, Wilderness, Third Harmonic Distortion, The Brogues, and Axilla. Dub producer Hopeton Overton Brown Scientist often worked at Social Services in the late 1990s.

Bands that have performed in the warehouse include: Grimes, Lightning Bolt, Mac DeMarco, Future Islands, Japanther, Wolf Eyes, Gravenhurst, Honne Wells, The Death Set, Matt + Kim, Anathallo, The USAISAMONSTER, Need New Body, Porches, and Dan Deacon.

Today, the Copycat is still home to many young artists, musicians, filmmakers, and professionals looking for a large space to create, study, and live in the city. Many residents use their living spaces to host art and music-related events.
