= William Tokarsky =

American character actor

William Tokarsky is an American character actor known for his recurring role as Len on Welcome to Flatch. He is also known for playing the Demon William on the Adult Swim series Your Pretty Face Is Going to Hell, and the Killer in the cult short film Too Many Cooks.

== Career ==
Tokarsky began acting following retirement from a job at General Motors in Doraville, Georgia. While visiting the film set for Get Low to catch a glimpse of its stars, Robert Duvall and Bill Murray, Tokarsky spoke with some extras and decided that acting "looked like fun". His first roles were bit parts in The Hunger Games: Catching Fire and Anchorman 2: The Legend Continues. Following his role as William the Demon on the Adult Swim series Your Pretty Face Is Going to Hell, Tokarsky was cast as the killer Bill in the short film Too Many Cooks.

In a 2015 article about Adult Swim for the British newspaper The Guardian, it was mentioned that tourists took photos of "William Tokarsky’s grim face, as he reprises his role from Adult Swim’s 70s and 80s sitcom title-sequence parody Too Many Cooks."

In 2015, a life cast mold of Tokarsky was made by Silver Scream FX Lab.

== Filmography ==
Film
Year	Title	Role	Notes
2013	The Hunger Games: Catching Fire	Someone Else	
2013	Anchorman 2: The Legend Continues	Cab Driver	
2014	Too Many Cooks	Killer	short film
2014	Lifelines	Mike/Michael	short film
2014	Play	Birtram Terra	
2014	Home for the Holiday	Santa	short video
2014	Hearts of Dust	Chaplain	short film
2015	The Lost Footage	The Body	short film
2015	Auld Lang Syne	The Black Mask	short film
2015	The Exchange CMF	Brother 2	short film
2015	Mallick	Cheating Lawyer	short film
2015	Five Windows	Thomas	short film
2015	Keening Nigh	The Taise	short film
2015	Samhain	Grandpaw	short film
2015	Gwilliam	Ex-Con	short film
2015	Roanoke: Search for the Lost Colony	Englishman #1	
2016	Crime Avenue	Harvey Feueranzunder	short film
2016	Bleed	Prisoner	
2016	Osterhase	Osterhase	short film
2016	Hart of America	Not the serial killer	TV short
2016	The Conscience	Michael Bailey	short film
2016	Conflicted	Boss	short film
2016	Escape	Killer	short film
2016	Merry Christmas, Baby	Nursing Home Resident	
2016	Behind 13	Phil	
2017	The People Could Fly	Master	short film
2017	Tragedy Girls	Mr. Gordon	
2017	Hamlet & Hutch	Trailer Park Trash	
2017	The God Inside My Ear	Mr. Stuffy Bottoms	voice
2017	Jumanji: Welcome to the Jungle	Bread/Cake Vendor	
2017	Manak: Deck The Halls	Veteran	short video
2017	Progidy [sic?]	Coach Ramrod	
2018	The Good Die Young	Buck	
2018	Through Her Eyes	Harvey Winstein	
2018	Tropical Cop Tales	Man with Gold Boots	
2018	My Annoying Dead Brother	Groundskeeper	
2018	Trial by Fire	Man in the Stetson Hat	
2019	The Poison Rose	Sanitarium Patient	
2019	Jacob's Ladder	Commuter	
2020	Penance Lane	Crazy Ray	
2023	Fetal Position	Jedidiah	short film
2023	The Marks	Sinclair	
2024	Brothers	Muzzy	
TBA	Miss Winn's Garden	Mr. Hill	short film
TBA	Indomitable	Bartender Jack	post-production
TBA	The Bounty Hunter	Clarence 'Preacher' Turner	filming

Television
Year	Title	Role	Notes
2012 - 2013	The Walking Dead	Ham Burke	10 Episodes
2014	Swamp Murders	Choppin Charlie	Episode: "Quilbillies"
2015	The Carbonaro Effect	Eugene Burger	Episode: "Dangerously Drinkable"
2015	Snapped: Killer Couples	Willis Honeycutt	documentary; episode: "Dena Riley & Richard Dean Davis"
2015	Fatal Attraction	Neighbor	documentary; episode: Social Media Murder
2015	Victoria's Path	Gruff the Troll	Episode: "My Bully"
2014-16	Homicide Hunter: Lt. Joe Kenda	Freddie/Joe Economy	documentary; 2 episodes: "Bump in the Night", "Murder Haunts Me"
2016	#killerpost	Melvin Potter	Episode: "Payne/Potter"
2016	Hidden America with Jonah Ray	Redneck	Episode: "Atlanta: Past, Present, Living, and Dead"
2014-2016	It's Supernatural!	Crippled Man/Neighbor	3 episodes: "James Durham", "Steve Swanson", "Aliss Cresswell 2016"
2015–2016	The Bubble	Creepy Stalker	Mini-series; 2 episodes: "Double Trouble", "Pilot"
2013-2017	Your Pretty Face Is Going to Hell	William/Demon William	14 episodes
2017	Kelly Talk Show	Himself	
2017	Love in 500 Characters	Jake	Episode: "Pilot"
2018	Murder Comes to Town	Carl Sanders	documentary; episode: "The Sinner and the Saint"
2018	Lodge 49	Older Gentleman	Episode: "Full Fathom Five"
2018	Murder by Numbers	Neighbor	Episode: "Monster Among Us"
2020	A-Men	Nuada Necht	Episode: ”Pilot”
2022	Welcome to Flatch	Len	7 episodes
