= Awesome Inc =

American animation studio

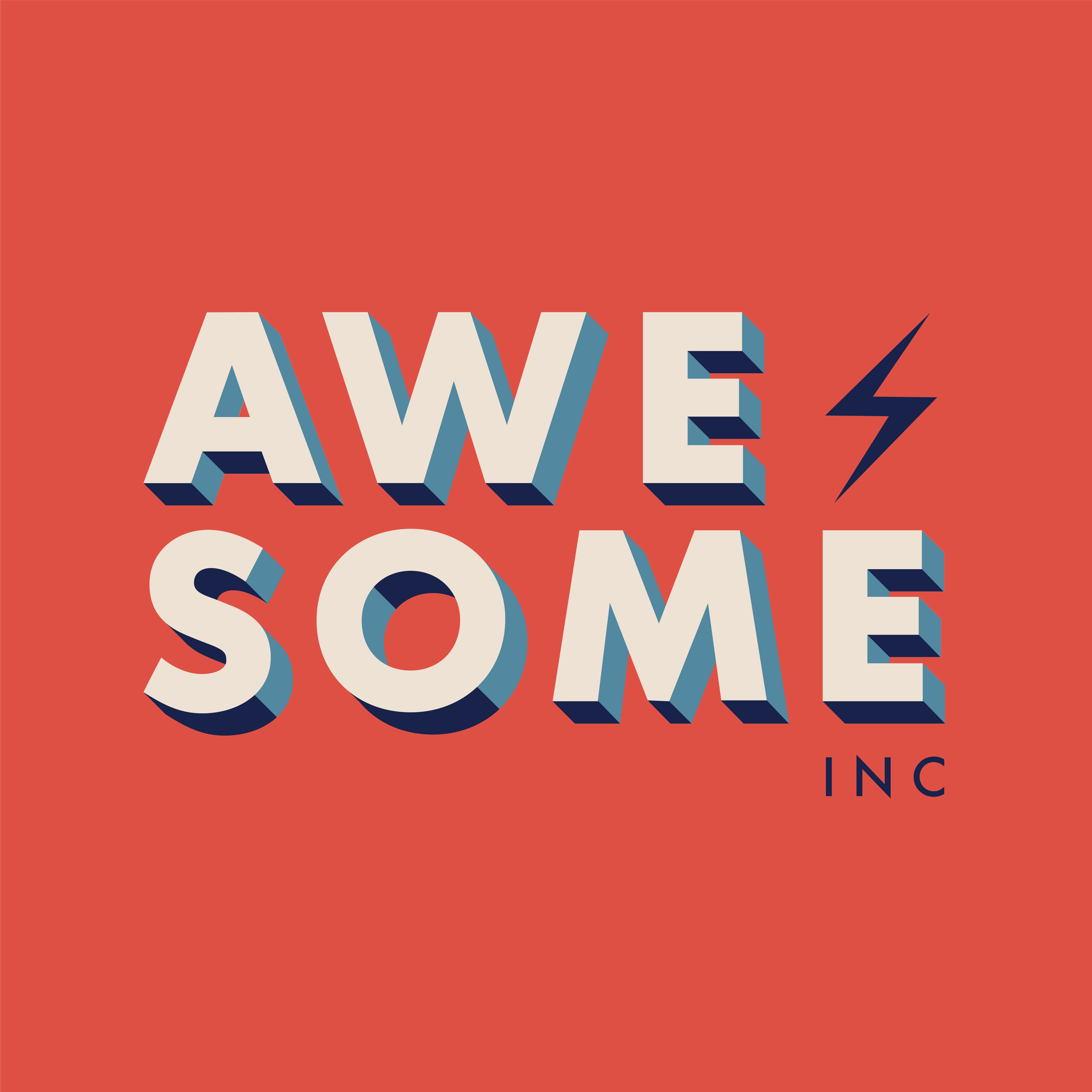
- Industry: Animation
- Founded: December 21, 2005; 20 years ago
- Founder: Ashley Kohler; Drew Tyndell
- Headquarters: Atlanta, Georgia, U.S.
- Website: www.awesomeinc.com

Awesome Incorporated, also known as Awesome Inc, is an American animation studio founded on December 21, 2005 by Ashley Kohler and Drew Tyndell. Located in Atlanta, Georgia, it produces adult animated television series as well as animation for commercials and live-action productions.

The studio is best known for its collaborations for Adult Swim, providing animation or producing shows such as Aqua Teen Hunger Force, Squidbillies, 12 oz. Mouse, Your Pretty Face Is Going to Hell, and Birdgirl. Awesome Inc also produces series for Comedy Central, including a reboot of Ren & Stimpy, and a spinoff of MTV's Daria, entitled Jodie.

== History ==
Launched on December 21, 2005, Awesome Inc began as a motion design studio, primarily focused on the creation of promos, commercials, and network packaging. In 2011, Awesome Inc became the studio of record to animate and composite Adult Swim's satire-comedy Squidbillies, which continued to run for another 10 seasons before concluding in November 2021. Awesome Inc also animated and composited 4 seasons of Adult Swim's Aqua Teen Hunger Force.

Upon the departure of Drew Tyndell as Creative Director and co-owner in 2013, Awesome Inc became a certified woman-owned business led by Ashley Kohler as President / CEO. In February 2021, Awesome Inc was tapped by ViacomCBS (now Paramount Global) to produce its first animated feature film Jodie.

== Productions ==
Project	Year(s)	
Squidbillies	2012–2021	Seasons 7–13
Aqua Teen Hunger Force	2013–2015	Seasons 10–11
The Awesomes	2013–2015	Opening animation
Too Many Cooks	2014	Television special
Your Pretty Face Is Going to Hell	2015–2019	Seasons 2–4
Final Deployment 4: Queen Battle Walkthrough	2018	Television special
Harvey Birdman: Attorney General	2018	Television special
12 oz. Mouse	2018–2020	Season 3, title sequence & TV special
Gēmusetto	2019–2020	Seasons 1–2
Tender Touches	2020	Season 3
Danny Ketchup	2020	Television special
Birdgirl	2021	Season 1
Macbeth With Dinosaurs	2021	Pilot
Star Trek: Very Short Treks	2023	Promotional shorts for the 50th anniversary of Star Trek: The Animated Series
