= Everything Is Terrible! =

Artist collective

Everything is Terrible!
- Title card as used at the end of the group's videos
- Abbreviation: EIT
- Formation: 2007
- Founders: Dimitri Simakis; Nic Maier; Katie Rife; Nick Moore; Joel Barhamand; Lehr Beidelschies; Aaron Maier
- Type: Artist collective
- Headquarters: 754 S. Atlantic Blvd East Los Angeles, California, United States
- Website: watch.everythingisterrible.com

Everything Is Terrible! is an artist collective based in Los Angeles that finds and edits dated, campy clips from VHS tapes. The collective was founded in 2007 by a group of friends who met while attending Ohio University.

== Activity and reception ==
According to NPR, they search thrift stores, garage sales, and bargain bins for the "worst and most ridiculous" VHS tapes. They have attempted to acquire the largest collection of Jerry Maguire on VHS. According to member Ghoul Skool, "Since the beginning, we have always noticed that thrift stores across the nation seem to be filled with nothing but Jerry Maguire tapes. I don't know why". In January 2017, the group opened their Jerry Maguire Video Store at iam8bit Gallery in Los Angeles. At the time of the installation, the number of Jerry Maguire VHS tapes collected was 14,000. As of May 30, 2023, the group has amassed an estimated 40,000 or more Jerry Maguire VHS tapes. While actively maintaining an online tally on their website, their ultimate goal was to construct a pyramid in the desert using the tapes.

While they are known for posting videos online of re-edited footage, the collective has also created 8 feature-length found-footage documentaries. In 2009, the group released its first film titled Everything Is Terrible! The Movie, made using the same style of VHS clips featured on their website. The A.V. Club called the video "a portal into a world halfway between showbiz and real-life—a look at how the people who make entertainment for a living think the rest of us saps actually live", adding that it's "simultaneously enlightening, hilarious, and deeply sad". Paste Magazine called the film "the best (worst?) clips from a range of categories [spun] together like a terrible salad". Wired has praised one of the collective's more popular clips titled "Infomercial Hell" – a series of clips from different infomercials pasted together – calling it "depressing" as well as "terribly funny". Since 2009, they have toured the US, Canada, and Europe, showcasing films and presenting a puppet variety show. In 2019, they opened their "semi-fake" East Los Angeles storefront at 754 S. Atlantic Blvd to the public, housing their VHS and DVD collection alongside immersive installations.

== Notable videos ==
One of their most popular videos is a clip titled "So Your Cat Wants a Massage?" – an instructional video that was designed to show people how to massage a cat. It has over 4 million views on YouTube. The video's creator, Maryjean Ballner, has since appeared as a guest on the Late Show with David Letterman. According to Ghoul Skool, Ballner thanked Everything Is Terrible!, despite her feelings that "YouTube can be a very negative place", for bringing back something which she had not seen in over 15 years.

Other notable videos include an edutainment clip about a dinosaur named Yello Dyno who, while dressed in a leather jacket and sunglasses, teaches children to protect themselves from pedophiles. Videos from Everything Is Terrible! have also been featured on the comedy show Tosh.0. Other videos have included a rejuvenating mask infomercial that featured Joe Cocker's "You Are So Beautiful" (which, according to the Chicago Tribune, helped launch the site in 2007), a direct-to-video crime drama featuring Jay Leno, and a video that features babies singing "Ten Little Indians" that was followed by, according to The Huffington Post, "what can only be described as 'A Clockwork Orange' reel for toddlers".

== Filmography ==
=== Video series ===
- Everything Is Terrible! (2007–present)
- Memory Hole (2014–present)

=== Films ===
- Everything Is Terrible! The Movie (2009)
- 2Everything 2Terrible 2: Tokyo Drift (2010)
- Doggiewoggiez! Poochiewoochiez! (2012)
- Everything Is Terrible! Holiday Special (2012)
- EIT! Does the Hip-Hop Vol. 1: Gettin' a Bad Rap! (2013)
- Comic Relief Zero (2013)
- Everything Is Terrible! Legends (2015)
- The Great Satan (2018)
- Kidz Klub! (2022)

=== TV pilots ===
- Gigglefudge, USA! (2016; in co-production with PFFR)

== In other media ==
Two Everything Is Terrible! founders, Nicholas Maier and Dimitri Simakis, created and wrote a live-action television pilot starring Paul Reubens and Eric Bauza entitled Gigglefudge, USA!, which premiered in April 2016 on Adult Swim, the 23rd installment in its series of Infomercials.

In Gigglefudge, USA!, Reubens acts as a TV host who introduces bizarre, often discomfiting home videos as compiled by Memory Hole (an offshoot of Everything Is Terrible! launched in 2014 by Maier and Simakis) in a matter that copies America's Funniest Home Videos, to the point that show's creator, Vin Di Bona, is credited as a producer.

== See also ==
- Found Footage Festival
- Derrick Beckles, creator of TV Carnage
- Tim & Eric
- Red Letter Media
