= Too Many Cooks (short) =

2014 short film by Casper Kelly

- The main title screen, with a font similar to that of Full House
- Genre: Parody; Comedy horror
- Created by: Casper Kelly
- Written by: Casper Kelly
- Directed by: Casper Kelly
- Starring: Ken DeLozier; Tara Ochs; Katelyn Nacon; Linda Miller; William Tokarsky; Katie Adkins
- Opening theme: "Too Many Cooks", performed by Shawn Coleman, Cheryl Rogers, Michael Magno, and Patty Mack
- Composers: Shawn Coleman; Michael Kohler
- Country of origin: United States
- Original language: English

Production
- Executive producers: Casper Kelly; Ashley Kohler; Keith Crofford; Mike Lazzo
- Producers: Alex Orr; Brandon Betts
- Cinematography: Adam Pinney
- Editor: Paul Painter
- Running time: 11 minutes
- Production companies: Fake Wood Wallpaper Films; Awesome Inc. (animation); Williams Street

Original release
- Network: Adult Swim
- Release: October 28, 2014

Related
- Infomercials

Too Many Cooks is a 2014 American surreal comedy horror short film that originally aired as a special during Adult Swim's Infomercials block on October 28, 2014, at 4:00 a.m. Eastern Time. It was created, written, and directed by Casper Kelly, and produced by Williams Street. After its original airing, the piece became a viral video online and was repeated each night at midnight Eastern Time during the week of November 11, 2014.

== Synopsis ==
The short begins as a parody of opening credits sequences of 1970s, 1980s, and 1990s American sitcoms, listing the actors in the fictional series Too Many Cooks. The credits introduce dozens of actors as the genre of the show gradually segues from a sitcom into a crime drama, a primetime soap opera, a Saturday morning cartoon, a superhero live-action series, a slasher film, and a science fiction series. Particular focus is put on a slasher film villain (played by William Tokarsky), who is hidden in the background of several early shots but eventually starts killing the other characters with a machete and replacing them in the credits. Everything is falling apart, different genres are colliding, and the text and people are swapping sides. The opening credits sequence ends after ten minutes and transitions into the "episode", with all the characters from the opening standing in one room; the short ends roughly ten seconds later, cutting to closing credits before a full line of dialogue can be spoken ("Honey, I'm ho–").

== Development and production ==
According to Kelly, he conveyed the concept of the short to his Squidbillies writer-producer friend Jim Fortier, who in turn described it to Adult Swim executive Mike Lazzo, who loved the idea. The footage was filmed over a period of three days in October 2013 with a cast completely composed of extras from the Atlanta area. Post-production took a year, with Kelly recruiting friends and co-workers to help with the process.

While the video depicts the opening credits of a fictional television show, most of the cast members' real names were used. According to Katie Adkins, actors were not presented with a clearly explained script, but rather coached on the go, in a somewhat nonchalant manner.

Among the series openings parodied are those of Full House, Wonder Woman, The Brady Bunch, Dallas, Dynasty, Battlestar Galactica, Falcon Crest, ALF, G.I. Joe, Roseanne, Family Matters, T. J. Hooker, Seinfeld, and the Law & Order franchise. The short briefly mentions Danish avant-garde film director Lars von Trier.

== Reception and legacy ==
Upon its release by a third party on YouTube, Too Many Cooks became a viral video, with Rolling Stone calling it an "instant cult classic". Director Rian Johnson said that, "no joke", Too Many Cooks should have been nominated for an Academy Award for Best Live Action Short Film (although it was in fact ineligible for this honor, not having had a cinematic release). Penn Jillette, Simon Pegg, Zach Braff, and Richard Kelly all tweeted their positive reactions to Too Many Cooks.

David Sims of The Atlantic wrote that Too Many Cooks relied on "the classic anti-comedy premise of taking so long with something that it goes from being funny, to being not very funny, to being boring, to suddenly becoming hilarious again. More than that, it's an excellent piece of non-narrative sketch comedy that sets out boundaries for its own weird reality and then goes about breaking them over and over again." Julian Darius called it "a sublime postmodern masterpiece" and analyzed its metafictional aspects.

Wesley Lara of Bloody Disgusting wrote that "Too Many Cooks is one of the strongest examples of transgressive programming on Adult Swim, taking full advantage of its environment to craft a memorable short that delivers both horror and comedy in an unusually successful manner."

In 2022, Rolling Stone ranked it the 10th-best TV theme song of all time, calling it an "earworm" that is "somehow every theme song, from every genre".

CNN created a parody of the video in March 2015, using it to mock the number of potential candidates in the 2016 United States presidential election. The video was conceived by digital producer Eric Weisbrod; Chris Moody, a senior digital correspondent at CNN and the video's creative director, noted that "b-roll from cheesy political ads...are almost taken right out of '90s sitcoms. If you look at old ads, it's families smiling at each other and smiling at the camera. It just fit so nicely."

In June 2018, Adult Swim published a short film by Casper Kelly and Nick Gibbons titled Final Deployment 4: Queen Battle Walkthrough, which parodies livestreaming gaming culture. Kelly described this short as his spiritual successor to Too Many Cooks.

In October 2025, Catalan comedy TV show Polònia parodied the short to mock Salvador Illa's promise to build an immeasurable amount of residential units. In the sketch, they try to fit as many people as possible into one flat instead. The parody used the same theme song.
