= Paid Programming (TV pilot) =

- Also known as: Paid Programming: Icelandic Ultrablue; Icelandic UltraBlue
- Genre: Comedy; Parody
- Created by: H. Jon Benjamin; David Cross
- Written by: H. Jon Benjamin; David Cross
- Directed by: Jeff Buchanan
- Starring: Christopher Cusumano; Justine D'Amour; Michael Harrah; Ray Higgs
- Country of origin: United States
- Original language: English

Production
- Executive producers: H. Jon Benjamin; David Cross
- Producer: Jackie Stolfi
- Cinematography: Jonathan Furmanski
- Editor: Toni Cusumano
- Running time: 11 minutes
- Production company: Williams Street

Original release
- Network: Adult Swim
- Release: November 3, 2009

Related
- Infomercials

Paid Programming (also known as Paid Programming: Icelandic Ultrablue or Icelandic UltraBlue) is an American television pilot created by H. Jon Benjamin and David Cross for Cartoon Network's late night programming block Adult Swim. It originally premiered in the United States, unannounced, on November 2, 2009 at 4:30 am (EST), at the specific request of Benjamin and Cross. Paid Programming is an informercial parody which, by design, features lesser known actors from Central Casting. Although it was not picked up for a full series it was re-aired numerous times and has received positive reception.

== Production ==
Paid Programming was created and written by H. Jon Benjamin and David Cross, and directed by Jeff Buchanan. The pilot episode was first announced at Dragon*Con 2009 in September 2009, where it was described as an "infomercial within an infomercial"; no other information was revealed at that time. Although Benjamin and Cross make voice cameos in the pilot, the cast of Paid Programming consists mainly of "non-recognizable" actors from Central Casting. The pilot does not feature any credits or production cards, and ended with a cliffhanger. In a 2010 interview David Cross mentioned it was their intent to make Paid Programming as similar to a real infomercial as possible, in order to trick unsuspecting viewers into thinking it's a real infomercial; and was upset that the project was announced at Dragon*Con. According to Benjamin and Cross, Adult Swim was only "semi-committed" to the project, and was worried that it would do poorly ratings wise. Paid Programming was not picked up as a full series, as revealed when Benjamin referred to it as an "abject failure".

Despite the pilot failing, the network greenlit more fake infomercials in 2012.

== Broadcast history ==
Similar to the broadcast history of The Rising Son, another program on Adult Swim, the pilot episode of Paid Programming was aired in the United States on the night of November 2, 2009 at 4:30 am (ET), unannounced and unadvertised, and was listed as "SPECIAL" on the Adult Swim schedule. After its original debut, Adult Swim then re-aired the pilot almost every Monday through Friday until December 4, 2009, and later posted it to their official site in 2015.

== Plot outline ==
The pilot starts as a typical advert for the "Icelandic Ultra Blue Health" line of dietary supplements. Dr. Samuelson announces the "Icelandic Ultra Blue Jingle" is being retired, and urges America to submit their own entries for a new jingle. After some entries are shown, a music producer advertises the "Icelandic Ultra Blue Air Purity Systems". This transitions into an animation of how the system functions, with "pure" air particles dressed as Nazi-esque soldiers herding "inferior air particles" into "the expulsion area", which then transitions into an advert for "Kimmel's Nazi Gold Exchange". Mrs. Kimmel develops a splinter, prompting an advert for "Fattfuck Splinter-B-Gones". Mrs. Kimmel flatlines during the removal procedure prompting Dr. Samuelson to advertise the "Icelandic Ultra Blue Embalm Balm". He then announces that his nephew Lars won the contest. Lars' performance is interrupted by a DJ, prompting an advert for a Jersey Shore nightclub named "Temptations". A person there complains of shave bumps, prompting an advert for "Icelandic Ultra Stuff", a cream to cure shaving bumps. After advertising for the "Icelandic Ultra Blue Ultimate Party Pack", Dr. Samuelson says "Phase one is complete" into his watch and looks up menacingly at the viewer along with the three extras in the shot. The screen then fades to black and the words "To Be Continued..." abruptly end the episode.

== Characters ==
- Dr. Torsten Samuelson – A Norwegian self-proclaimed "Doctor" who has spent "thirty-six years hanging out in the medical community". Best known as the founder and lead spokesmen for Icelandic Ultra Blue.
- O'Connel Mcmicmic (Justine D'Amour) – A singer who worked with Wendy Clitlock to produce "Icelandic Eire Go Chalk", a musical entry for the "new Icelandic Ultra Blue jingle" contest.
- Wendy Clitlock – (Lou Hemsey) An award-winning record producer who serves as the spokesman for the "Icelandic Ultra Blue Air purity system".
- Mr. Kimmel (Ray Higgs) and Mrs. Kimmel – The married owners of "Kimmels Nazi Gold Exchange". After Mrs. Kimmel suffered a splinter-related death, her body was preserved using "Icelandic Ultra Blue Embalm Balm".
- Danny Fattfuck – The pants-less owner of "Fattfuck Splinter-B-Gones".
- Lars (Christopher Cusumano) – Dr. Samuelson's nephew who won the contest for the "new Icelandic Ultra Blue jingle".

== Reception ==
During November 2009, when the pilot was aired every morning, Adult Swim received negative feedback from viewers upset that re-runs of Aqua Teen Hunger Force were replaced with the pilot Paid Programming. During November 2009, the Adult Swim Message boards were filled with posts from users who were confused and unsure of what it was.

Cross showed the pilot episode to a group of about 600–700 people in London, during a monthly comedy event called "Popcorn Comedy night". To Cross's surprise, the majority of the audience laughed so hard they missed some jokes; Cross stated, "Quite often they didn’t even get the references, but they got the context, I guess".
