= Wham City =

Art and performance collective based in Baltimore, Maryland, US

Wham City was an art and performance collective based in Baltimore, Maryland. Members of Wham City included musicians Dan Deacon and Ed Schrader, visual artists Jimmy Joe Roche, Peter Ryan O'Connell, Mason Ross, Adam Endres, Dina Kelberman, April Camlin, Connor M. Kizer, Robby Rackleff, Cricket Arrison, Alan Resnick and Ben O'Brien.

== Events ==
From 2005 to 2010, Wham City organized Whartscape, an annual experimental music and arts festival in Baltimore as an alternative to the city's Artscape festival. The festivals included performances by Matmos, Beach House, Double Dagger, Ian MacKaye, Lil B, and Dan Deacon. In its 2010 article about the festival, The Washington Post called Whartscape, "the premier DIY music event in the country".

Wham City member Connor Kizer organizes a bi-monthly lecture series in Baltimore in which local and visiting artists speak on a diverse range of topics. In 2009, The Wham City Lecture Series won "Best Non-Music Bar Act" in the Baltimore City Paper.

Wham City members Ben O'Brien and Alan Resnick organize an annual east coast skit comedy and stand up tour entitled, "The Wham City Comedy Tour". The tour was founded in 2010 by Dan Deacon and Ben O'Brien. Under the banner "AB Video Solutions", Wham City created several short films for Adult Swim, including the satirical infomercial Live Forever as You Are Now with Alan Resnick, which aired in December 2013.

== History ==
Wham City began as a popular underground show space in The Copycat Building in Baltimore, MD in the mid-2000s. Many of the group's principal members met while attending State University of New York at Purchase in the early 2000s before moving to Baltimore City. The song "Wham City" on Dan Deacon's Spiderman of the Rings album was written, according to the musician and co-founder, as a "national anthem" for the collective.

As of February 21, 2022 the group is on indefinite hiatus.

== Related links ==
- Official website
