= List of Check It Out! with Dr. Steve Brule episodes =

Check It Out! with Dr. Steve Brule is a spin-off of Tim and Eric Awesome Show, Great Job! starring John C. Reilly as Dr. Steve Brule. The series premiered on Cartoon Network's late night programming block, Adult Swim, on May 16, 2010. The series has completed four seasons with six episodes each.

== Series overview ==
Season	Episodes	Originally released	
Season	Episodes	First released	Last released
1	6	May 16, 2010	June 20, 2010
2	6	March 18, 2012	April 22, 2012
3	6	February 27, 2014	April 4, 2014
4	6	June 17, 2016	July 29, 2016
Special		October 23, 2017	

== Episodes ==
=== Season 1 (2010) ===
No. overall	No. in season	Title	Original release date	Prod. code
1	1	"Food"	May 16, 2010	105
Dr. Steve Brule talks about one of life's most essential means of survival: food. He meets waitress Sunshine, with whom he makes a surprising connection.
2	2	"Relationships"	May 23, 2010	102
Dr. Steve Brule explores the wonders of relationships and sex. Dr. Brule interviews Dr. Dan Dungus about sex. Plus a look at Yesterday's Weather. Tim Heidecker and Eric Wareheim guest star as Channel 5's married news team, Jan and Wayne Skylar.
3	3	"Family"	May 30, 2010	103
Dr. Steve discusses the importance of family. The Doctor visits his mother, Dorris Pringle-Brule, his magician uncle, Gary Brule, and his (non-existent) older brother, Stan Brule. Dr. Brule meets his estranged father in a park, who is later revealed to be a mere look-alike. Plus a look at sports.
4	4	"Health"	June 6, 2010	101
Dr. Steve discusses the topic of being ugly or pretty. A look at a high school quarterback. Also, spiritual health. Maria Bamford guest stars, and porn star Ms. Deja appears in an aerobics segment.
5	5	"Fear"	June 13, 2010	104
Dr. Steve addresses his fear of puppets. A visit to the Bob Baker Marionette Theater leads to a bad dream. An injury occurs during jack-o-lantern carving. David Liebe Hart guest stars.
6	6	"Friendship"	June 20, 2010	106
Dr. Steve Brule visits a local male strip club in an effort to seek out new friends. He invites his neighbor Steve to assist him on his search for friends. Dr. Brule ends up passed out in a gay bar, revealing his own deep depression.

=== Season 2 (2012) ===
No. overall	No. in season	Title	Original release date	Prod. code	US viewers (millions)
7	1	"Boats"	March 18, 2012	201	0.835
In a report on boats, Dr. Steve visits Captain Gary at the marina, scores big with dumpster seafood, and takes a kayak trip. A swarm of wasps interferes with the recording of "Yesterday's Weather." Carol Krabit discusses the best bait and location for crabbing.
8	2	"Pleasure"	March 25, 2012	203	0.793
Dr. Steve encounters injury and an old clown at a county fair. A spa and candy store are also explored, with haphazard results. Singer Ron Don Volante plugs new music.
9	3	"Money"	April 1, 2012	202	0.746
After a failed attempt to visit the US Mint, Dr. Steve braves a job interview, discovers card counting, and angers security guards at a casino. Doug Prishpreed reports on an upcoming decathlon and a failed cannon firing.
10	4	"Space"	April 8, 2012	204	0.705
In a close encounter of the questionable kind, Dr. Steve meets with aspiring actor and alien abductee David Liebe Hart to talk extraterrestrial technology.
11	5	"Animals"	April 15, 2012	205	0.751
Dr. Brule finally goes furry, all while promoting Toad's new Creamed Chip Beef, Corned Beef Hash combo can. Dr. Brule finds out he has arachnophobia during his Doctor to Doctor with Sean Roach.
12	6	"Life and Death" "Life, Death"	April 22, 2012	206	N/A
Dr. Steve Brule goes on a journey through the physical as he meditates on life and then death.

=== Season 3 (2014) ===
No. overall	No. in season	Title	Original release date	Prod. code	US viewers (millions)
13	1	"Planes"	February 28, 2014	301	1.111
Dr. Brule witnesses a traumatizing airplane accident involving a new co-host. To assuage his fears, he decides to take an airplane ride of his own.
14	2	"Church"	March 7, 2014	302	1.222
Dr. Brule goes to church and sets out to become a priest; however, he is soon tempted by darker and more sinister activities.
15	3	"Home"	March 14, 2014	303	1.052
Dr. Brule learns about home by visiting the home of Jan and Wayne Skylar, but Wayne dies on-air due to many cancers. He then visits Hippy Joel's home, a tent in the woods, where Joel hunts down Brule with a crossbow.
16	4	"Horse"	March 21, 2014	304	1.070
Dr. Brule learns all about horses. He interviews a child clown who rides horses for a living.
17	5	"Children"	March 28, 2014	305	1.050
Dr. Brule visits a day care facility for boys, and learns that if they misbehave you just need to spray them with poison. Later, he helps his mother deliver her baby.
18	6	"Skateboards"	April 4, 2014	306	1.183
Dr. Brule tries to show off skateboard tricks, but ends up suffering from amnesia after injuring his head. He meets with friends and family to try and remember who he is and what he does.

=== Season 4 (2016) ===
No. overall	No. in season	Title	Original release date	Prod. code	US viewers (millions)
19	1	"Cars"	June 17, 2016	401	0.968
Dr. Brule goes shopping for a new car and learns how to fix cars; Scott Clam reports on a clam contamination at a local river.
20	2	"Eggs"	June 24, 2016	402	0.973
Dr. Brule learns about eggs by eating some at various diners, where he meets a man who may be his estranged father. Later, he promotes the latest Myer's Super Foods product; Doug Prishpreed reports on his upcoming dental work and Pablo Myers warns of a health hazard involving his cans.
21	3	"Words"	July 8, 2016	403	0.825
To learn more about words, Dr. Brule visits a library, meets some foreign language speakers, and competes in a spelling bee; Terry Bruge-Hiplo hosts a free medical examination.
22	4	"Music"	July 15, 2016	404	0.768
Dr. Brule goes to a music store and interviews some musicians, even working as a roadie for a rock band; Scott Clam reports on avian life and Doug Prishpreed advertises a barbecue.
23	5	"Stevie!"	July 22, 2016	405	0.815
Dr. Brule launches a live talk show, featuring co-host Carol Krabit and special guests Doug Prishpreed and Pablo Myers. However, all goes awry when Myers warns of an astronomical phenomenon.
24	6	"Crime"	July 29, 2016	406	0.879
Dr. Brule and Scott Clam visit a jail (where Dr. Brule sees an old friend) and help some police officers catch criminals; Carol Krabit reports on a disease outbreak and is taken over by the Dark Lord. Brule and Clam go on a ride along with a police officer and help him out on a traffic stop. As of the end of the Season 4 Finale, Brule is arrested and Scott Clam takes over as the new host of "Check It Out".

=== Special (2017) ===
No. overall	No. in season	Title	Original release date	Prod. code	US viewers (millions)
25	1	"Check It Out! with Scott Clam"	October 23, 2017	407	N/A
Scott Clam, new host of 'Check It Out!', discusses trains with David Liebe Hart. Note: This special was aired as part of Infomercials.

== See also ==
- Bagboy (TV special)
