= Tim and Eric Nite Live! =

- Genre: Comedy; Satire; Talk show
- Created by: Tim Heidecker; Eric Wareheim
- Starring: Tim Heidecker; Eric Wareheim
- Country of origin: United States
- No. of seasons: 1
- No. of episodes: 12

Production
- Running time: 8-32 minutes (average 23 min)

Original release
- Network: SuperDeluxe
- Release: November 8, 2007 – March 4, 2008

Related
- Tim and Eric Awesome Show, Great Job!

Tim and Eric Nite Live! is an American web series, which premiered November 8, 2007 on SuperDeluxe. The talk show stars Tim Heidecker and Eric Wareheim, creators of Tom Goes to the Mayor and Tim and Eric Awesome Show, Great Job!, and consists of a variety of strange segments often featuring Tim and Eric Awesome Show, Great Job! regulars such as David Liebe Hart and James Quall. It also repeatedly features Awesome Show regular Richard Dunn in a sidekick/father-figure type role. It parodies public-access television and talk shows in an absurd and often cringe-worthy style as in Tim and Eric's other works.

The show saw many guests in its short, internet-only, SuperDeluxe-exclusive run, including John Mayer, Zach Galifianakis, Bob Odenkirk, Will Forte, Rainn Wilson, and Jonah Hill.

== Episodes ==
No.	Title	Original release date
1	Doug Lussenhop as "DJ Douggpound"	
The premiere episode of Tim and Eric Nite Live!
2	Stuart Rigby as "Thomas McKenna"	
We always believed that Tim and Eric had Hollywood connections, but who knew that they could get Tom Cruise to appear on this second installment of Tim And Eric Nite Live? Of course, they couldn't leave regulars Richard Dunn and James Quall out of party.
3	Doug Lussenhop	
Break out the bubbly! Tim and Eric celebrate their 3rd live broadcast in style with a comedy contest.
4	Bob Odenkirk	
Getting ready for the holidays. What better way to kick off the holiday season that with this Christmassy episode of Tim And Eric Nite Live? Watch Bob Odenkirk as he reviews the onslaught of holiday movies! See Richard Dunn on a romantic date! All that's missing is a big red bow!
5	Will Forte as "Emanuel Melly" and Neil Hamburger	
Tim and Eric get into the spirit of the holiday season with a master gingerbread house builder... then all hell breaks loose.
6	Ron Austar, Doug Lussenhop as "DJ Douggpound" and Michael Q. Schmidt	
A Tim and Eric Christmas Spectacular with one-hundred holiday honks, five Richard Dunns and one very jolly surprise! The gang's all here for a very special Tim and Eric Nite Live Christmas.
7	TBA	
Returning from their holiday break, Tim and Eric Night Live sets off the new year with their first attempt at high definition broadcast.
8	Rainn Wilson, and Doug Lussenhop as "DJ Douggpound"	
It was a Super Tuesday indeed. On this special election edition, Tim and Eric cover the race between Bob Bop Perono vs. Bill Clinton.
9	John Mayer, and Michael Q. Schmidt	
Love was ON the air in this special Valentine's Day broadcast, with guest none other than heart-throb John Mayer, and a special appearance by Cupid.
10	Bob Odenkirk, and Doug Lussenhop	
Who doesn't love chocolate? We know two chocoholics named Tim and Eric who just can't stop singing about it! Then stick around for the production meeting when great ideas are born and a few eyes get blackened.
11	Doug Lussenhop as "DJ Douggpound"	
After last week's big blowout, Tim and Eric reevaluate their relationship. David Liebe Hart sings a song of peace, James Quall does a comedy routine for peace, and Richard Dunn recites a poem for peace. Can't we all just get along?
12	A.D. Miles as Dr. Linda, DJ Douggpound, Stephen Williams, plus many more classic characters from the Awesome show.	
OK, sure, with the season finale, Tim and Eric are back together and the whole gang is there to celebrate. But that doesn't mean all is good in their world. In fact, this episode changes everything when somebody gets shot! Think you know what really happened? You'd never guess.

== Reception ==
- by Jason Thompson, Bullz-Eye, "A Chat with Tim Heidecker and Eric Wareheim"
- by Dylan P. Gadino, Punchline Magazine, "Tim and Eric: Awesome Interview, Great Job!"
- by Jocelyn Guest, NYMag, "How the Internet Got Awesomer: Tim and Eric’s plan for online domination"
