= Richard Dunn (actor) =

American actor (1935–2010)

- Born: Richard Forrest Dunn Jr. December 18, 1935; Urbana, Illinois, U.S.
- Died: June 4, 2010 (aged 74); Los Angeles, California, U.S.
- Occupation: Actor

Richard Forrest Dunn Jr. (December 18, 1935 – June 4, 2010) was an American character actor, best known for his work with the comedy duo Tim & Eric (Tim Heidecker and Eric Wareheim). He notably made several appearances on the duo’s sketch comedy television series Tim and Eric Awesome Show, Great Job!.

== Early life ==
Dunn was born in Urbana, Illinois, one of four children (himself, two brothers and a sister). During junior high school, he played football and regarded it as one of the few times in his life he was really motivated. His family moved to Chicago, IL and lived there for a few years, before moving to California, where they lived for the duration of World War II. After the war he moved back to Chicago with his family for a brief period until the Korean War, at which time they moved back to California. His mother died when he was 16, and at 17 he joined the U.S. Navy, where he went through basic training in San Diego. After a four-year Navy career he resumed a normal life in California working with horses, however he shortly joined the U.S. Air Force, where he remained employed for another four years. After which, he returned to his life of horses for another nine months before re-joining the Navy. He remained in the Navy until March 1977, at which point he retired at the age of 41. He resided in southern California thereafter, where he attended Santa Monica College. The Navy made a lasting impression on him. Dunn considered his other significant influences to be his mother in law, his junior high coach, and producer Robert Marcus.

== Acting career ==
Dunn portrayed many different characters (often bizarre versions of himself) in many episodes of Tim and Eric Awesome Show, Great Job! from 2007 until 2010. In addition, Dunn had small roles in House, Parks and Recreation, Weeds and Nip/Tuck. He also appeared in the 1998 film The Wedding Singer and the music video for Diddy's 2000 single "Bad Boy for Life.". He first got into show business through his friend, producer Robert Marcus. He volunteered to be a 'gofer' (production assistant) for Marcus' productions. Marcus wrote a book about how to be a production assistant and dedicated it to Dunn. He first got his start as an actor by taking roles as a background actor, and subsequently took classes for acting. He performed a number of roles in commercials and music videos. His first few professional roles earned him enough money to become a member of the Screen Actors' Guild. Dunn was approached by Tim Heidecker in a parking lot and offered a gig playing Tim's father in the first episode of Tim and Eric Awesome Show, Great Job!. After this, Dunn was a regular feature in the show, as well as other outlets of the Tim and Eric franchise until his death, and was posthumously honored in the first episode of spin-off series Check It Out! with Dr. Steve Brule and the song "Richard Dunn is Done" by fellow Tim and Eric Awesome Show, Great Job! regular David Liebe Hart on his album Mixtape.

== Death ==
Dunn died in Hollywood on June 4, 2010, at the age of 73.

== See also ==
- List of Tim and Eric Awesome Show, Great Job! sketches and characters
