= Awesome Record, Great Songs! Volume One =

Studio album by Tim & Eric
- Released: 6 May 2008
- Genre: Novelty, comedy, experimental, electronic, hip hop, rock, pop rock, synth-pop
- Length: 74:31
- Label: Williams Street Records
- Producer: Tim & Eric

Awesome Record, Great Songs! Volume One is a 2008 comedy album by Tim Heidecker and Eric Wareheim, collectively known as Tim & Eric, released on Williams Street Records. The album features many songs from the first and second seasons of their Adult Swim television series Tim and Eric Awesome Show, Great Job!, as well as additional skits. It features many of their frequent collaborators on the series, bands covering songs from the show such as Built to Spill and The Shins, and remixes, including one by Flying Lotus.

Notably a few songs are missing from the show that are not on this release, including "Cops and Robbers" by "Casey and his Brother" (from the episode "Salame") and "Funk Barn" by the "Jeff GoldBluMan Group" (from the episode "Innernette").

== Track listing ==
All songs by Davin Wood, Eric Wareheim, and Tim Heidecker unless noted.

No.	Title	Length
1.	"Sports!"	1:21
2.	"I Sit Down When I Pee"	1:01
3.	"Doo Dah Doo Doo"	2:05
4.	"Beaver Boys"	1:30
5.	"Salame" (featuring David Liebe Hart)	2:35
6.	"Time Travel"	0:52
7.	"Rolo Tony"	0:45
8.	"Poke On"	1:24
9.	"Petite Feet"	1:17
10.	"Sit On You"	0:48
11.	"Father And Son" (featuring David Liebe Hart)	1:23
12.	"My Sister's Cute"	0:46
13.	"Hamburgers and Hotdogs"	0:57
14.	"Pumpers Tumblers"	1:23
15.	"Pizza Boy" (featuring David Cross)	0:42
16.	"Come Over"	2:56
17.	"The New You" (featuring Maria Bamford)	0:43
18.	"Hearts" (featuring Aimee Mann)	1:59
19.	"Beach Blast" (featuring James Quall)	0:59
20.	"Stay in School" (featuring David Liebe Hart)	1:53
21.	"Dirty Socks"	1:06
22.	"Horse and Buggy Ride"	0:57
23.	"The Snuggler"	1:05
24.	"All of My Life"	1:21
25.	"Raz"	1:12
26.	"Long Legs"	1:12
27.	"No Sunsets"	1:33
28.	"Shrimp and White Wine"	1:27
29.	"Marcama" (featuring David Liebe Hart)	2:05
30.	"Here She Comes" (featuring Bob Odenkirk)	1:05
31.	"Casey's Lost"	0:44
32.	"Lost in the Wheel"	2:11
33.	"Love Slaves"	1:42
34.	"Wipe My Butt"	1:14
35.	"Together Forever"	1:58
36.	"Awesome Show Theme" (featuring DJ Douggpound)	3:43
37.	"Wipe My Butt" (featuring The Shins)	2:36
38.	"Come Over" (featuring Built to Spill)	2:49
39.	"Where's My Chippy" (featuring DJ Douggpound)	1:04
40.	"One for Pep Pep (Flying Lotus Remix)"	3:21
41.	"Sports! (Sports Bar Remix)"	2:06
42.	"Sports! (Dance Club Remix)"	2:26
43.	"Come Over" (by the "A to Z" band)	2:34
44.	"Salame Rock"	1:05
45.	"Snuggler 8-Bit"	1:28
46.	"Rolo Tony (Uncut)"	1:00
47.	"Cops and Robbers" (by the "A to Z" band)	0:58
48.	"Big Ben 2" (by the "A to Z" band)	0:50
49.	"Crackers and Snacks A"	0:19
