= Bagboy (TV special) =

Television comedy special

- Genre: Comedy
- Created by: Tim Heidecker; Eric Wareheim; John C. Reilly
- Based on: Check It Out! with Dr. Steve Brule
- Written by: Tim Heidecker; Eric Wareheim; John C. Reilly
- Directed by: Tim Heidecker; Eric Wareheim
- Composer: Davin Wood
- Country of origin: United States
- Original language: English

Production
- Executive producers: Tim Heidecker; Eric Wareheim; John C. Reilly; Dave Kneebone
- Producers: Dave Paige; Clark Reinking
- Cinematography: Gabriel Patay
- Editor: Andrew Fitzgerald
- Running time: 22 minutes
- Production companies: Abso Lutely Productions; Williams Street

Original release
- Network: Adult Swim
- Release: February 21, 2015

Bagboy is an American television special produced by Abso Lutely Productions for Adult Swim, and aired on February 21, 2015, to positive critical reception. Created and written by Tim Heidecker, Eric Wareheim, and John C. Reilly, the special is a fictional sitcom pilot in the universe of Tim and Eric Awesome Show, Great Job!, written by and starring Reilly's recurring Tim & Eric character Dr. Steve Brule. This is the second Tim & Eric spin-off to feature the Dr. Steve Brule character after Check It Out! with Dr. Steve Brule.

== Plot ==
Bagboy is a fictional television pilot for a sitcom created by Dr. Steve Brule for Channel 5. Dr. Steve Brule directs himself in the title role of a rejected sitcom pilot about a Myer's Super Foods bagboy who must decide whether or not to report a shoplifter. Shelved for its "substandard quality and low entertainment value", it begins with an introduction by Pablo Myers, owner of Myer's Super Foods, along with his family. After the opening with Steve injuring himself after mopping the floor inside of Myer's Super Foods, Steve is shown stocking some produce when he is asked by Micky Dolenz (as himself) where the bananas are. After pointing to them, Brule is asked by cashier Daisy to bag customer Doug Prishpreed's cans. Prishpreed offers her a VIP ticket to the Dumpster Dive show featuring himself before rudely taking away his bags from Steve. Afterwards, Steve attempts to reveal his true affections for her when he is interrupted by his coworker Chip, who says that he has two tickets for a Twisted Chains concert.

Myers suddenly calls all employees to his office for an emergency meeting. When they get there, he announces that there has been an increase in shoplifters, and that any employee who captures one will be granted ten free cans of food from their stock. After fantasizing about the reward, Brule goes on the look out behind where the haughty Mrs. Livingstone is shopping. After being scolded by Livingstone for scaring her, he decides to go over to the CCTV feed to search for any shoplifters. When he sees a young boy, who turns out to be Daisy's little brother Charlie, stealing a candy bar, he contemplates with his imaginary friend "Dog" whether he should let him go free or turn him in—the latter potentially souring his relationship with Daisy. Myers then appoints Steve to work the night shift to look out for any other shoplifters.

At night, Steve attempts to look throughout the aisles. After playing with security guard Terry's gun, he goes off to snack on some horse meat, when he thinks of how disciplining Charlie would not be the right course of action. Just then, he hears a strange sound coming from butcher Brown's cutting room, and when he goes in, he finds Charlie tied to a piece of meat. Steve argues that punishing Charlie for shoplifting by grinding him up is unwarranted, but Brown says that he is doing so for the joy of murder. After bargaining with Brown in exchange for 25 of Myer's cans, he finally lets Charlie go. At the parking lot, Brule tells Charlie not to steal so that he grows up to be a "cool guy" and not a "dumb hunk" like Chip. As he lashes out on Chip, Charlie offers that if he lets him off, he will put a good word in with Daisy. The two agree, and in the morning, when Steve reports to Myers that he did not catch anyone, Myers gives him ten cans for staying late.

== Cast ==
- John C. Reilly as Dr. Steve Brule, the protagonist and bagger for Myer's Super Foods
- Danny Allen as Brown, the butcher
- Robert Axelrod as Terry Bruge-Hiplo, the security guard
- Micky Dolenz as himself
- Jake Elliott as Chip, a clerk
- Doug Foster as Doug Prishpreed
- Carol Kraft as Carol Krabit as Mrs. Livingstone
- David Liebe Hart as "Dog", a puppet and Steve's imaginary friend
- Jadyn Mark as Charlie, Daisy's little brother
- Nancy Muñoz as Dorris Pringle-Brule, Steve's mother
- Pablo Pumphrey as Pablo Myers, owner and manager of Myer's Super Foods
- Scott Stewart as Scott Clam, the assistant manager
- Jocelyn van Orden as Daisy, a cashier
- Ron Don Volante as himself
- Diego Alexander as Myer's Son (uncredited)

== Background and production ==
In various interviews regarding the special, Reilly spoke as an executive producer on behalf of his Brule character; Reilly wrote to Vanity Fair that, "ever since Check It Out! came out, all anyone wants to do is talk to Steve and know how the show is made and know what he's like and I don't think that's interesting. I don't think that helps the show... There's no point in doing it!" In an interview with Boing Boing, he called the special "kind of a lost episode" starring "all the people from Steve's world". When asked by Esquire whether the special would prompt a fourth season of Check It Out!, he said that it was possible "as long as people want [Brule] to do it", and that from the response of their Tim and Eric Tours, "people definitely want it. And they want to see Bagboy... this whole new thing he's done that no one has seen".

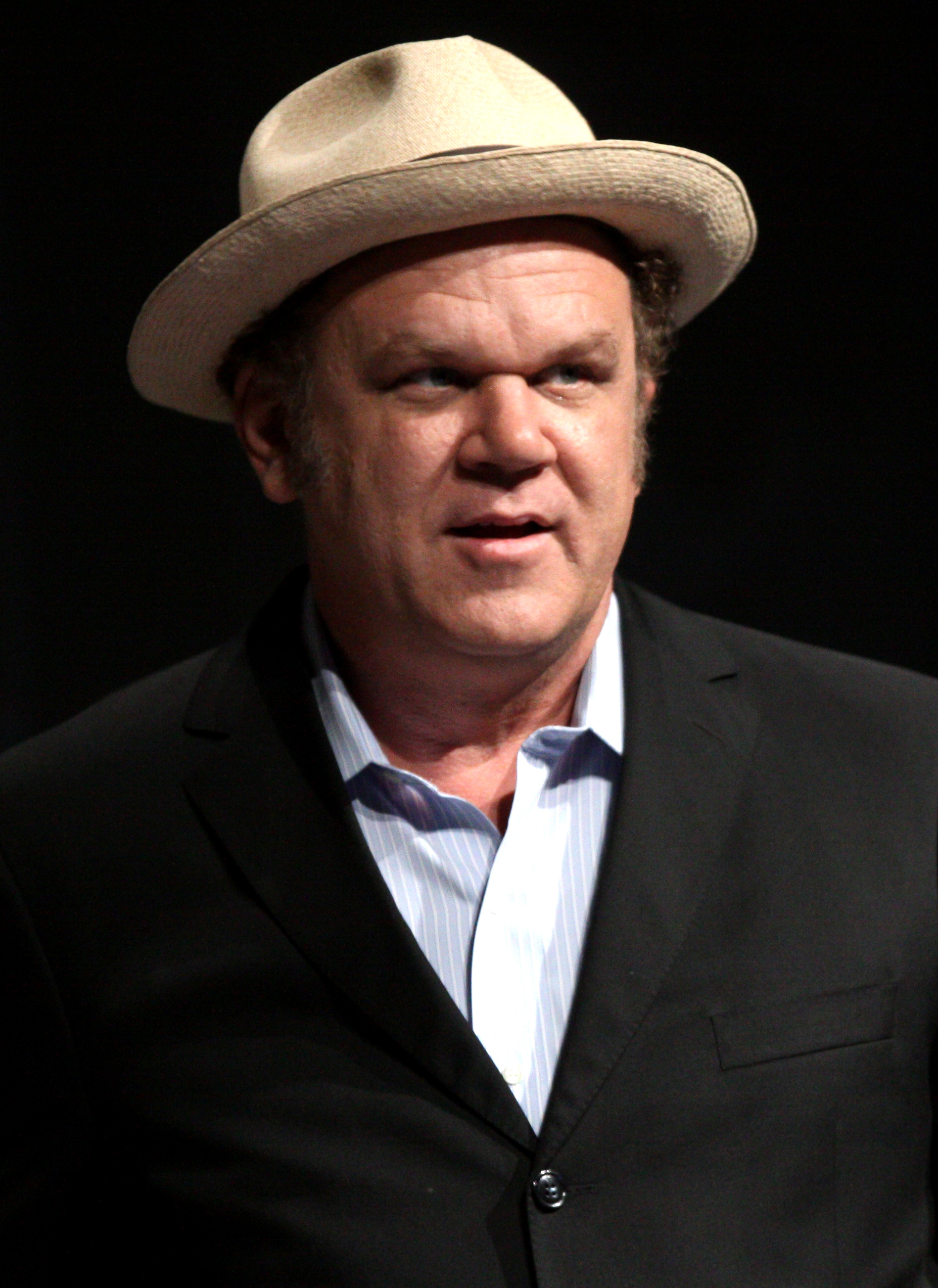
Reilly (pictured) portrays Steve Brule, who "created" the pilot on which the special is based.

== Broadcast and reception ==
Bagboy premiered on Adult Swim on February 21, 2015. (Note: Although sources give the date as February 20, 2015, it was scheduled to air at 12:30 a.m. the next day.) A short preview of the special was shown at the 2014 edition of the Tim and Eric Tour in September, where it was bootlegged and republished by The A.V. Club and The Verge. (Note: Another snippet was published in Entertainment Weekly.) Josh Modell of The A.V. Club wrote that "perhaps fan reaction from the tour was loud enough to unbury what looks like another insane gem, not to mention a spin-off of a spin-off of a show within a show". A trailer was released by the network a day before the premiere. In the aforementioned publication, Dennis Perkins called the special a "top pick" of the night" along with the series premiere of The Jack and Triumph Show on the same network, writing "may God have mercy on us all". Paste writer Garrett Martin stated that "nothing in February excites us as much as Bagboy".

After its premiere, Dan Caffrey of The A.V. Club gave it an A− grade, writing that, while not as nightmarish as Heidecker and Wareheim's other works for the network, it would attract comparisons to the horror-comedy short Too Many Cooks, which also aired on Adult Swim. He remarked the acting as "a perfect mixture of those who are self-aware and those who are sincere", contrasting what he saw as sincere efforts from the periphery cast to Reilly, who "knows how to match the stiltedness of every misfit who walks on camera, and the younger actors playing the cashier and Chip seem to know what's going on as well". Writing in the Den of Geek, Daniel Kurland rated it three-and-a-half out of five stars, complimenting the world building of Brule's universe while expressing that it was "not the best thing that Tim and Eric have put out recently", yet "still expertly assembled and conveys what it's trying to".

Melissa Locker of Vanity Fair called the "situational humor and subtlety" of it "knockout hilarious" for those who "get it", but concluded that, "truthfully, it is not for everyone". In an essay for the Los Angeles Review of Books entitled "I Want My Anti-TV: On 'Tim and Eric'", Gavin Tomson called it an "anti-TV experiment" that, in line with "typical sitcom[s]", was produced to be "boring, moralizing, heteronormative, and not that funny", calling Brule's fantasies "emotionally stunted yet oddly normative".
