= Dinner with Friends with Brett Gelman and Friends =

2014 film

- Header image from the official website
- Created by: Brett Gelman; Jason Woliner
- Written by: Brett Gelman; Jason Woliner
- Directed by: Jason Woliner
- Starring: Brett Gelman
- Composers: Cyrus Ghahremäni; Heather Christian (only in Brett Gelman's Dinner in America)
- Country of origin: United States
- Original language: English

Production
- Executive producers: Brett Gelman; Jason Woliner; Tim Heidecker; Eric Wareheim; Dave Kneebone
- Producers: Jonathan Roig; Griffin Pocock (only in Brett Gelman's Dinner in America)
- Cinematography: Christian Sprenger (in Dinner with Friends with Brett Gelman and Friends); Carl Herse (in Dinner with Family with Brett Gelman and Brett Gelman's Family); Noble Jones (in Brett Gelman's Dinner in America)
- Editors: Jason Woliner; Doug Lussenhop (in Dinner with Friends with Brett Gelman and Friends); Michael Giambra (in Dinner with Family with Brett Gelman and Brett Gelman's Family); Julio Perez (in Brett Gelman's Dinner in America)
- Running time: 22 minutes
- Production companies: Abso Lutely Productions; Williams Street

Original release
- Network: Adult Swim
- Release: April 24, 2014

Dinner with Friends with Brett Gelman and Friends is a 2014 American television special created and written by Brett Gelman and Jason Woliner for Adult Swim. The special features Brett Gelman as a demented version of himself, along with several guests, who also play fictionalized characters of themselves. Gelman and Woliner had frequently collaborated on other projects before producing the special.

On its broadcast on April 24, 2014, the special was positively received by critics. A sequel, titled Dinner with Family with Brett Gelman and Brett Gelman's Family, aired February 13, 2015, featuring Gelman as he reenacts his childhood to his parents on their anniversary.

== Plot ==
Brett Gelman hosts a dinner party with Dale Dickey, Gilbert Gottfried, Alex Karpovsky, Fred Melamed, Alison Pill, and Lance Reddick. Gelman shows himself to have an evil side as the party goes on. When the guests have had enough, he reveals this to be a prank. Karpovsky leaves; however, Joey Fillipiano (Anthony Atamanuik) warns that there is no escape. In order to bond better, following his misbehavior, he makes the remaining five reveal their innermost secret to each other clandestinely.

After they receive their entrées, Gelman tells that he has devised a play starring each of the remaining five. He blackmails them with a recording of their telling of secrets—and threatens to tie them up just as Karpovsky has been—if they fail to comply. The five recite the play, but Gelman stops it, unamused. When police sirens sound, he instructs the guests to ambush the officers using the handguns they are given. It turns out to be a chimpanzee dressed in a police uniform, and everyone is relieved until a henchman informs Gelman that they are short a gun. Gottfried, who has it, threatens to shoot Gelman. Gelman convinces him to hand over the gun, with which he then uses to murder Gottfried.

Gelman forces Melamed to bury his corpse outside with a shovel. He uses it to attack Gelman, along with the rest. Afterward, Gelman wakes up and explains he must have had a psychotic episode. He laments the murder of Gottfried before revealing this to be a farce and that what he has done was planned from the start. He decides to let them go, informing that he will be following them for the rest of their lives.

== Production ==
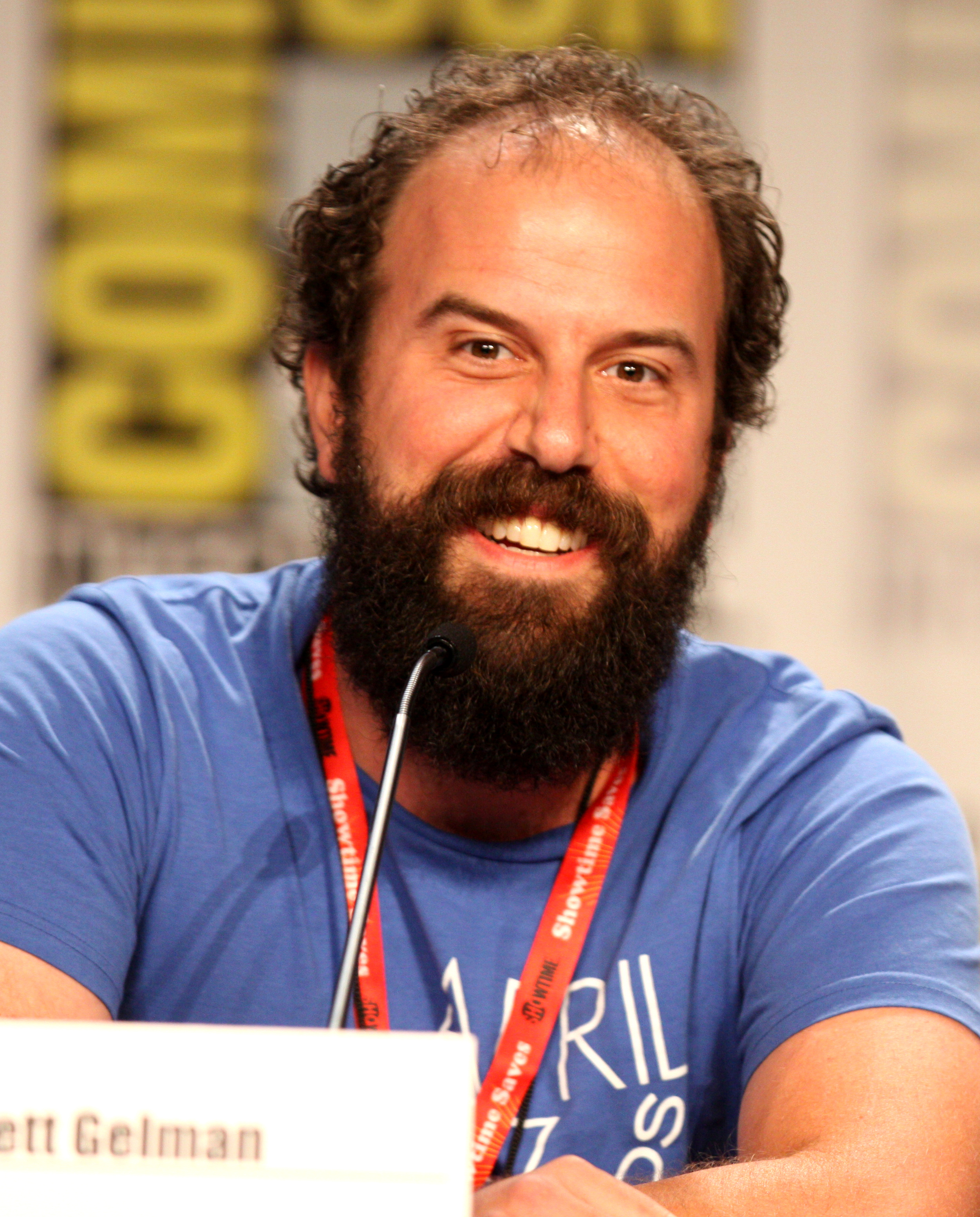
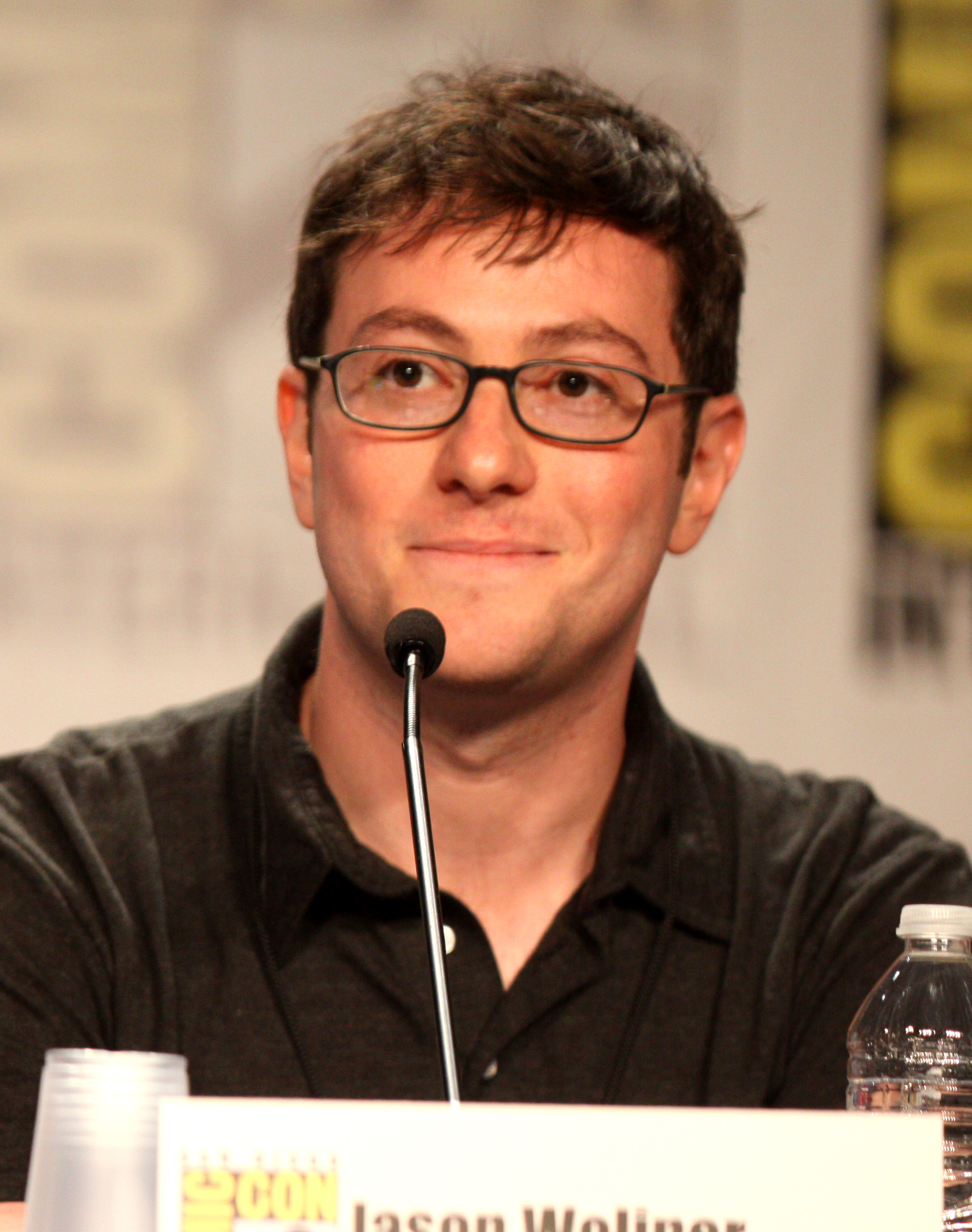
Brett Gelman (top) stars in the special, directed by Jason Woliner (bottom).

Dinner with Friends was created and written by Brett Gelman and Jason Woliner (the latter is also the director). The two had been frequent collaborators for several years since they met at the Upright Citizens Brigade Theatre. Gelman stars on Eagleheart, for which Woliner writes and directs. On the set of the show, Woliner came up with the plot of the special, which had Gelman deliver a stand-up to a table of six. When they pitched the idea to Adult Swim, they suggested to scrap the stand-up part.

The half-hour special was filmed in two days. Gelman and "friends" star as fictionalized characters of themselves. Gelman considered his character, which he developed on his Gelmania podcast and UCB performance of the same name, exaggerated, yet somewhat identical, to his own. Woliner and Gelman were inspired by the works of Lars von Trier and Michael Haneke, as well as Dinner for Five. He saw it as a combination of Dinner for Five and The Shining, as well as of Saw. He categorized the special as comedy horror and a play, though he sought to clarify that it was entirely scripted. Gelman chose to star the guests for their wide range of talent, calling Gottfried a "heartbreaking" drama actor despite being a comedian by trade.

== Broadcast and reception ==
Dinner with Friends premiered on Adult Swim on April 24, 2014. This broadcast was seen by 1.3 million viewers, receiving a Nielsen rating of 0.6 for adults in the 18- to 49-year-old demographic. In this same demographic, it was the seventeenth most viewed of the top 100 cable shows.

In GQ, Jen Ortiz called it "surreal" and "hilarious". Sydney Bucksbaum of Zap2it wrote that viewers should watch it with an open mind, discarding expectations and inhibitions, because "you have never seen anything quite like this, and you probably won't ever see anything quite like it again". Bradford Evans of Splitsider called its pacing stand-out and its blending of horror and comedy exceptionally unique, writing that it was "genuinely suspenseful and frightening in parts". In LA Weekly, Liz Ohanesian compared its pacing to Eagleheart, making for plot twists "more bizarre than an audience member can anticipate".

== Sequels ==
Plans for a sequel were discussed as early as the first one approached its air date.

=== Dinner with Family with Brett Gelman and Brett Gelman's Family (2015) ===
A sequel aired February 13, 2015. Titled Dinner with Family with Brett Gelman and Brett Gelman's Family, it features Gelman as he hosts a dinner party with his parents (Barry Primus and Barbara Gruen) for their anniversary. When he reenacts scenes from his childhood on-stage with actors playing the part of his parents (Tony Roberts and Patti LuPone), the dinner takes a terrifying turn as suicide, incest, and drug addiction are revealed in Gelman's past and present. Gelman found that the dinner format made for a more traumatic environment once horror was introduced because of its inherent tranquility.

The producers reached out to Roberts and LuPone's agents, to which the actors expressed enjoyment at the script, though Roberts was repulsed at first. Gelman wrote in a cover letter to Roberts and LuPone that he and Gelman would avoid shock humour, instead aiming for a dialog about dysfunctional families in a hyperbolic manner. On this topic of families, the two chose it as big theme of life, and so he wanted to go for a darker direction compared to the last. He found that continuity was limited, with the exception of Atamanuik's character, while also referring to it as a companion piece of the last.

The debut broadcast of Dinner with Family was seen by 1.1 million viewers, receiving a Nielsen rating of 0.5 for the aforementioned demographic of Dinner with Friends and becoming the twenty-sixth most viewed of the top 100 cable shows in it. Garrett Martin of Paste called both the sequel and the original "hilarious and incredibly hard to watch".

=== Dinner in America with Brett Gelman (2016) ===
A second sequel, Dinner in America with Brett Gelman, premiered on July 1, 2016. Its guests include Loretta Devine, Shareeka Epps, Joe Morton, and Mack Wilds.
