= Beef House =

Sitcom

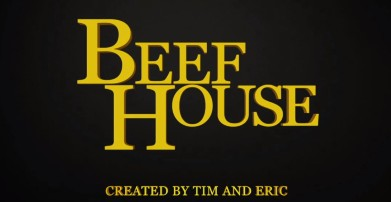
- Genre: Sitcom
- Created by: Tim & Eric
- Starring: Tim Heidecker; Eric Wareheim; Jamie-Lynn Sigler
- Country of origin: United States
- Original language: English
- No. of seasons: 1
- No. of episodes: 6

Production
- Executive producers: Tim Heidecker; Eric Wareheim; Dave Kneebone; Vera Drew (Note: Vera Drew and Andrew Porter are co-executive producers.); Andrew Porter; Keith Crofford (Note: Keith Crofford and Walter Newman are executive producers for Williams Street.); Walter Newman
- Producer: Mark Costa (Note: Mark Costa is producer for Williams Street.)
- Running time: 11 minutes
- Production companies: Abso Lutely Productions; Williams Street

Original release
- Network: Adult Swim
- Release: March 30 – May 4, 2020

Beef House is an American sitcom created by and starring Tim Heidecker and Eric Wareheim. The series premiered on Adult Swim on March 30, 2020. The series is described as a parody of 1980s and 1990s American family sitcoms, featuring Wareheim and Jamie-Lynn Sigler as a married suburban couple who live with the former's best friend (Heidecker) and a trio of eccentric men.

On January 1, 2021, Tim and Eric hosted a watch-along of Tim and Eric's Billion Dollar Movie. As part of it, they mentioned that they had already written a second season of Beef House, but that any potential production would be delayed indefinitely due to the COVID-19 pandemic. On August 8, 2021, Heidecker announced that although scripts have been written, Adult Swim has no plans in renewing the series for a second season. In September 2025, Heidecker and Wareheim said on Tim Heidecker's podcast Office Hours that the show is fictitious and does not exist.

== Premise ==
Eric Wareheim plays Eric, a put-upon suburbanite who is married to Detective Megan (Sigler), a high-strung police detective with whom he shares a largely one-sided and acrimonious relationship characterized by her openly expressing her disdain for him and her attraction to other men. Living with Eric are his best friend, Tim (Heidecker), an Army veteran and aspiring rock musician, and a trio of middle-aged to elderly men: foul-mouthed handyman Ron Austar, psychic Tennessee Luke, and pervert Ben Hur. Each episode functions as a parody of the conventions of the traditional American family sitcom, beginning with traditional plotlines and story setups—such as an old friend coming to visit or trying to impress a neighbor—that are subverted as the episodes descend into absurdity and chaos.

== Cast ==
- Tim Heidecker as Tim
- Eric Wareheim as Eric
- Jamie-Lynn Sigler as Detective Megan Dungerson
- Ron Austar as Ron
- Tennessee Winston Luke Fortenberry III as Tennessee Luke
- Ben Hur as Ben Hur
- Kannon Hicks as Boro
- Devin Mills as Lana
- Michael Bowen as Brad
- Beth Grant as Eric's Mother

== Episodes ==
No.	Title	Directed by	Written by	Original release date	US viewers (millions)
1	"Army Buddy Brad"	Tim Heidecker & Eric Wareheim	Tim Heidecker & Eric Wareheim	March 30, 2020	0.42
Tim's old Army buddy Brad shows up to the Beef House and immediately moves in, trying to rekindle an old romance with Megan. The Beef Boys conspire to get him out by tricking him into thinking that a global war has started and he is needed on the frontlines.
2	"Prunes"	Tim Heidecker & Eric Wareheim	Tim Heidecker & Eric Wareheim	April 6, 2020	0.43
Tim is constipated for days and a global prune shortage makes it impossible for him to defecate before his big date with neighbor Lana. Ron helps rig up a tube that will expel the feces whenever Tim gets in her hot tub, but it sprays diarrhea all over the Beef House.
3	"Boro"	Tim Heidecker & Eric Wareheim	Tim Heidecker & Eric Wareheim	April 13, 2020	0.48
Eric's nephew Boro comes to stay at the Beef House for a brief time to discourage his misbehaving. When Tim's authoritarianism only results in Boro stabbing him dozens of times, Tennessee Luke uses his psychic powers to remap Boro's mind and the boy comes to stay at the Beef House indefinitely.
4	"Beaver in the Beef House"	Tim Heidecker & Eric Wareheim	Tim Heidecker & Eric Wareheim	April 20, 2020	0.46
Tim uses performance-enhancing drugs to practice his darts, but his work is interrupted by a beaver crawling in the walls. Ben Hur dons a beaver costume to lure out the creature and Tim kills it with a dart to the brain as it has sex with Ben.
5	"Bus Driver"	Tim Heidecker & Eric Wareheim	Tim Heidecker & Eric Wareheim	April 27, 2020	0.40
Eric gets a job as a bus driver, but his first day on the job ends in disaster when he gets a bad night of sleep due to the Beef House boys causing a ruckus and he drives off a bridge, killing all 64 passengers. Megan brings him into the station and is about to send him to jail for life when Boro and Ron sabotage the bus to make it look like a mechanical failure was to blame and they clear Eric's name.
6	"Crab Dip"	Tim Heidecker & Eric Wareheim	Tim Heidecker & Eric Wareheim	May 4, 2020	0.50
When a flyer for a block party arrives, Tim insists on turning the Beef House into a haunted house and Eric only obliges under the precondition that he can make gallons of his famous crab dip. Tennessee Luke accidentally unleashes the ghost of Eric's mother, who committed suicide because her son was a loser, and she inhabits Megan's body. The crab dip is tainted with diarrhea from Tim's constipation in "Prunes".

== Critical reception ==
Reviewing series premiere "Army Buddy Brad", Randall Colburn of The A.V. Club gave the episode an A−, praising the aesthetic and its storytelling for capturing the absurdity of 1990s American family sitcoms.
