= Tom Goes to the Mayor =

Television series

- Created by: Tim & Eric
- Written by: Tim Heidecker; Eric Wareheim; Bob Odenkirk; Tom Scharpling; Jon Wurster; Doug Lussenhop
- Directed by: Tim Heidecker; Eric Wareheim; Jarred Alterman; Jonathan Krisel
- Starring: Tim Heidecker; Eric Wareheim; Stephanie Courtney; Craig Anton; Ron Lynch; Bob Odenkirk; Michael Q. Schmidt
- Composer: Davin Wood
- Country of origin: United States
- No. of seasons: 2
- No. of episodes: 30 (+ two pilots and one special)

Production
- Executive producers: Tim Heidecker; Eric Wareheim; Bob Odenkirk; Matt Harrigan
- Producer: Jonathan Krisel
- Editors: Jonathan Krisel; Christopher McDonnell; Doug Lussenhop; Grady Sain
- Running time: 11 minutes
- Production companies: Dipshot Films (2004–05); Abso Lutely Productions (2006); Williams Street

Original release
- Network: Adult Swim
- Release: November 14, 2004 – September 25, 2006

Related
- Tim and Eric Awesome Show, Great Job!

Tom Goes to the Mayor is an American adult animated sitcom created by Tim Heidecker and Eric Wareheim for Cartoon Network's late-night programming block, Adult Swim. It premiered on November 14, 2004, and ended on September 25, 2006, with a total of 30 episodes.

== History ==
Tom Goes to the Mayor began as a web cartoon on timanderic.com. It was popular enough to get a web sequel, in which David Cross guest-stars. Bob Odenkirk noticed the show's potential, and began producing it for Adult Swim.

Adult Swim has described Tom Goes to the Mayor as "one of the most polarizing shows" they have ever had, indicating that viewers "either love it or hate it."

== Overview ==
Tom Peters (Heidecker) has just moved to Jefferton, an unpleasant, rundown town filled with strip malls and buffets. Episodes usually focus on Tom going to the mayor (Wareheim) with various ideas for business and civic endeavors, and the mayor tweaks those ideas and causes them to backfire in horrible and destructive ways, leaving Tom to answer for them.

The show features a crude but distinctive limited animation style made by taking photos of the cast with different facial expressions and body language. The photos are then filtered using the "photocopy" image filter in Adobe Photoshop, resulting in the show's unique monochromatic blue and white images resembling Ditto machine copies. Some live-action scenes, usually on a television set, are included within the show.

Many characters, segments, and content from Tom Goes to the Mayor have resurfaced in Tim and Eric Awesome Show, Great Job!, including the Channel 5 Married News Team, the Cinco Company, Gibbons, and even a live-action version of Tom Goes to the Mayor used as an opening for the episode "Pepperoni".

== Characters ==
Main characters the Mayor (left) and Tom Peters

- Tom Peters (Tim Heidecker) – Tom Peters (né Pickle) is a good-natured 32-year-old entrepreneur whose ideas are often turned into disasters due to continuous inept interference from the mayor. Tom comes across as weak-willed, timid and lacking in self-esteem, never calling out the mayor on his irrational behavior and allowing himself to be used and manipulated by everyone he comes into contact with. He is often taunted by his stepchildren (from wife Joy's previous marriage), not to mention the rants he receives from Joy. Tom has no apparent job (besides "local entrepreneur") and drives a Maluch that has severe emission problems. A common running gag on the show is that despite Tom's name being very simple, it is nearly always misspelled when written out, such as "Tom Petres", "Thom P. Tiers" and "Taumpy Tearrs." Another running gag to the show is Tom mispronouncing words; for example, when presenting his résumé to the Mayor, he pronounces it as "resume". He also never uses profanity and instead uses phrases like "shirt", "crickets", etc. – even going so far as to refer to a dam as a "darn". His first wife was a woman named Pat, who is now married to her husband Cal.
- The Mayor (Eric Wareheim) – The Mayor is a superficially friendly yet childish and sadistic man who often spends his working days watching the TV in his office. He often uses a condescending tone when speaking to Tom. He usually gains control of Tom's suggestions for the community and twists them into embarrassing and bizarre situations. According to the Adult Swim website, he has served Jefferton for the past twelve years, due to family connections, low voter turnout, and a strange local law which gives the mayor thirteen-year terms of office. However, it is worth noting that the Mayor has been in office since the Pioneer Island Theme Park burned down "20 years ago." The Mayor is married and has three sons. Throughout the series, the Mayor has displayed traits such as stupidity, wickedness, selfishness and even insanity.
- Joy Peters (Stephanie Courtney (voice), Michael Q. Schmidt (live action)) – Tom's obese, slovenly, greedy and mean wife. She is very domineering and arrogant towards Tom and is a selfish and uncaring mother to her sons. Although her master bed is large, she makes Tom sleep on a cot off to the side. She is often seen hogging their computer—which she uses to chat with strange men—to the point where it impedes Tom's business schemes. Joy is gluttonous and often seen messily gobbling food.
- Tom's stepsons – Brandon, Brendon and Brindon are Joy's idiotic, destructive and deformed-looking children from her first marriage, who became Tom's stepsons. Renamed after a re-birthing process.
- Jan Skylar (Tim Heidecker) and Wayne Skylar (Eric Wareheim) – "the only married news team in the tri-county area" are newscasters on Channel 5. After the series finished Jan and Wayne Skylar became recurring characters on Tim and Eric Awesome Show, Great Job! and Check It Out! with Dr. Steve Brule.
- The City Council (Craig Anton and Ron Lynch) – Jefferton's city council, who often meet at Gulliver's Buffet, try to be the voice of reason when the mayor presents them with insane and nonsensical plans, but they do not put up much of a fight due to their overall unenthusiasm.
- Gibbons (Brian Posehn) – Tom's old "friend" from junior college, he suffers from a height disorder and speaks in monotone. Despite claiming to be friends, Tom often uncharacteristically loses his patience with Gibbons and starts to bully him.
- Renee the Receptionist (Stephanie Courtney) – The Mayor's bored receptionist
- Bob Odenkirk often appears as various characters in many episodes, sometimes appearing in live action instead of sketched.

== Episodes ==
=== Series overview ===
Season	Episodes	Originally released	
Season	Episodes	First released	Last released
Pilots		Unaired	
1	13	November 14, 2004	June 12, 2005
2	17	June 5, 2006	September 25, 2006
Special		June 12, 2005	

=== Pilots ===
Title	Guest(s)	Original release date
"Tom Goes to the Mayor"	None	Unaired
Tom suggests to The Mayor that he should open two new restaurants in town from his Skooner's and Gulliver's restaurant chains.
"Tom Goes to the Mayor Returns"	David Cross	Unaired
Tom suggests fixing Main Street to The Mayor, in order to throw a parade in honor of "Lobster Day".

=== Season 1 (2004–05) ===
No. overall	No. in season	Title	Directed by	Written by	Guest(s)	Original release date	Prod. code
1	1	"Bear Traps"	Tim Heidecker and Eric Wareheim	Tim Heidecker, Eric Wareheim, and Bob Odenkirk	Jack Black, Kyle Gass, Bob Odenkirk	November 14, 2004	101
While the Mayor is watching a television program of Mike Foxx's Scared Safe, a show dubiously devoted to child safety, Tom pops by with some half-witted ideas about improving child safety. Somehow, the Mayor comes up with the perfect child-safety solution: bear traps. With the aid of the Bear Trap Brothers (played by Jack Black and Kyle Gass of Tenacious D), Jefferton becomes the locale of the highest bear-trap-to-child ratio in the state.
2	2	"WW Laserz"	Tim Heidecker and Eric Wareheim	Tim Heidecker, Eric Wareheim, and Bob Odenkirk	Bob Odenkirk	November 21, 2004	102
Flush with a chest full of World War II memorabilia he bought from the online auction site Webuy, Tom pitches an idea for a theme restaurant to the Mayor, who happens to have a grant from the city council for $300,000 for a historical project previously slated for a live monkey encased in an eclair covered with delicious chocolate-flavored sauce. Unfortunately for Tom, the Mayor insists his nephew Terry assist him in his efforts. Terry is actually in his late 20s, but because of his addiction to an inhaler, he looks, sounds, and behaves like a 12-year-old. Tom and Terry have creative differences, and the resulting restaurant (WW Lazerz) turns out to be a mockery of Tom's ideas.
3	3	"Pioneer Island"	Tim Heidecker and Eric Wareheim	Tim Heidecker, Eric Wareheim, and Bob Odenkirk	Patton Oswalt, Bob Odenkirk	December 5, 2004	103
Inspired by a TV commercial, the Mayor decides to resurrect the Jefferton theme park Pioneer Island, which burned to the ground many years ago amid mysterious circumstances. To celebrate the re-opening of the park, the Mayor launches a week-long "pioneer time" to the town. With Tom as his point man, the Mayor shuts off the town's power, makes everyone exchange their car keys for horses, and dons a turn of the 18th century French courtier costume. Without power, problems ensue, manifested by electronics salesman-turned-warlord Zynx (played by Patton Oswalt), and it's up to Tom to make things right.
4	4	"Toodle Day"	Tim Heidecker and Eric Wareheim	Tim Heidecker, Eric Wareheim, and Bob Odenkirk	Jeff Goldblum, Bob Odenkirk	December 12, 2004	105
Although he has limited experience with dogs (and no dog), Tom is selected by the Mayor to provide a canine matchmaker for Jefferton's yearly holiday Toodle Day, in which all eligible dogs in town are married. After purchasing the "last dog" from the local pet shop (run by Jeff Goldblum), Tom sets about the difficult task of training his new pup to become the Toodle Day matchmaker. But the dog-doo hits the fan when Tom's pup is waylaid by an accident, and it's up to Tom to make sure the town's dogs achieve wedded bliss.
5	5	"Rats Off to Ya!"	Tim Heidecker, Eric Wareheim, and Jarred Alterman	Tim Heidecker, Eric Wareheim, and Bob Odenkirk	Jeff Garlin, Bob Odenkirk	December 19, 2004	104
When Tom comes up with a novelty t-shirt depicting a top-hat doffing rat and the phrase "Rats Off to Ya!", the Mayor is so delighted by it he grants Tom a kiosk in the mall to peddle his wares in time for the Christmas shopping season. But after setting up his stand in front of a novelty store run by the glad-handing Pat Croece (played by Jeff Garlin), Tom has his shirt concept stolen (and improved) by the devious Croece. Tom's subsequent attempts to capitalize on the "Rats Off" idea (which becomes an overnight sensation) center around a pathetic "Hats Off to Ya" shirt, which is not nearly as endearing. ("Rats Off To Ya!" shirts were actually produced and can be purchased from the show's creators.)
6	6	"Porcelain Birds"	Tim Heidecker and Eric Wareheim	Tim Heidecker, Eric Wareheim, and Bob Odenkirk	Maria Bamford, John Ennis, Edward Herrmann, Bob Odenkirk	April 17, 2005	106
When Jefferton's bird sanctuary is threatened by development, Tom brings the Mayor a petition from the town to save the birds. But the Mayor has a better idea: buying thousands of dollars' worth of porcelain birds that are sure to appreciate significantly in value. Of course, Tom foots the bill with Joy's credit card, but when the birds turn out to be worth a bit less than the Mayor anticipated, woe is in the wind for Tom's finances and the real, non-porcelain birds.
7	7	"Vehicular Manslaughter"	Tim Heidecker and Eric Wareheim	Tim Heidecker, Eric Wareheim, and Bob Odenkirk	Michael Ian Black, Bob Odenkirk, MQ Schmidt	April 24, 2005	107
Tom proposes a renewable power source based on human waste. Predictably, just as the City Council is about to approve the idea, the Mayor steps in, demanding a third party to verify Tom's plan. The third party turns out to be an old friend of the Mayor (played by Michael Ian Black) who seems more interested in dancing with the Mayor and calling Tom "Steven" than verifying anything. When Tom accidentally kills Black in a traffic accident, he's presented the choice of giving a eulogy at the funeral or facing manslaughter charges. Due to the fickle nature of his "Fun-Puter" (due to his wife Joy using his laptop for online sex with a customer), he's also forced to choose between saving his eulogy file or the file with his power plan. At the end of the episode, the meaning of the word "Steven" is made clear, putting the whole episode in perspective.
8	8	"Boy Meets Mayor"	Tim Heidecker and Eric Wareheim	Tim Heidecker, Eric Wareheim, and Bob Odenkirk	Bob Odenkirk	May 1, 2005	108
Scandal grips Jefferton as a tape of the Mayor and the town's band leader Roy Teppert makes it to the media. The tape contains odd and non-explicit material, but the town descends into chaos over the "sexy scandal". The Mayor needs a PR man to help him ride the storm, and Tom is that PR man. In order to distract the furor over the sex tape, Tom, the Mayor and the sickly son of a local sandalmaker, Mr. Sandleman (played by Bob Odenkirk) take to a hot-air balloon and attempt to break a hot-air balloon record previously held by Sandleman.
9	9	"Calcucorn"	Tim Heidecker and Eric Wareheim	Tim Heidecker, Eric Wareheim, and Bob Odenkirk	David Cross	May 8, 2005	110
The subject of Todd's (Joy's ex-husband) TV pilot Mi$ter Entrepreneur, Tom has developed a novelty calculator, the Calcucorn, which features a pink unicorn that speaks results of equations. The Mayor orders 3,000 of the calculators and distributes them to all local government officials and businesses - including a construction firm building a major cross-town bridge - before Tom "works out the kinks", exposing in dramatic fashion that the calculators are inaccurate. Tom, faced with the stress of being constantly filmed by Joy's ex-husband (played by David Cross) and the various crises caused by his faulty calculators, has a very non-Tom-like breakdown.
10	10	"Gibbons"	Tim Heidecker and Eric Wareheim	Tim Heidecker, Eric Wareheim, and Bob Odenkirk	Brian Posehn	May 15, 2005	111
Tom's old friend Gibbons (played by Brian Posehn) gives a solid example of someone who's even a bigger loser than Tom when he visits Jefferton and fails to leave as expected. Tom has a falling out with Gibbons, and when the Mayor stumbles on Gibbons at the Friendship Expo, he becomes smitten with the diminutive, annoying man. Tom's shortcomings as a friend are exposed at the expo when Gibbons falls in a well and gets media attention.
11	11	"Pipe Camp"	Tim Heidecker and Eric Wareheim	Tim Heidecker, Eric Wareheim, and Bob Odenkirk	Sarah Silverman	May 22, 2005	112
After all three of Tom's stepsons have heart attacks and Joy verbally accosts Tom for interrupting her breakfast, Tom decides to take the initiative and form a "health camp for boys". The Mayor is delighted by the idea, so long as it's funded by Pipe's Buffet, a pipery/eatery located above the Mayor's office specializing in pipe tobacco and fatty meats. But when Tom suspects that the female counselor at Pipe Camp (played by Sarah Silverman in a fat suit) may be pushing fatty meats and pipe smoking on the young boys at the camp, he is faced with yet another insurmountable dilemma: the weird feelings he may be having for her.
12	12	"Re-Birth"	Tim Heidecker and Eric Wareheim	Tim Heidecker and Eric Wareheim	Scott Chernoff	June 5, 2005	109
When Tom tries to start his own consulting business, the City Council rejects his application because his family is not registered. With the Mayor's assistance, Tom embarks on a three-step program to "normalize" his family, using Joy in a rebirthing ceremony which may or may not help get them registered.
13	13	"Vice Mayor"	Tim Heidecker and Eric Wareheim	Tim Heidecker, Eric Wareheim, and Bob Odenkirk	Fred Willard	June 12, 2005	113
Before Tom can flee Jefferton (being quite distraught that nothing has "worked out" for him), the Mayor awards him the post of Vice Mayor. However, this turns out to be the Vice Mayor of Hobotown, and it does not take long for Tom to become embroiled in a bad real-estate deal and a hobo revolution.

=== Special (2005) ===
Title	Guest(s)	Original release date
"A Look Behind the Scenes"	David Cross, Jeff Garlin, Jeff Goldblum, Doug Lussenhop, Bob Odenkirk, Patton Oswalt, Brian Posehn, Michael Q. Schmidt, Sarah Silverman, and Fred Willard	June 12, 2005
A behind the scenes look at the process of making the show, with outtakes and film clips. Made to celebrate the first season.

=== Season 2 (2006) ===
No. overall	No. in season	Title	Directed by	Written by	Guest(s)	Original release date	Prod. code
14	1	"My Big Cups"	Tim Heidecker, Eric Wareheim, and Jonathan Krisel	Tim Heidecker, Eric Wareheim, and Bob Odenkirk	Sir Mix-a-Lot, Dustin Diamond	June 5, 2006	223
Tom opens a store called My Big Cups, which sells 1.8 liter cups. When The Mayor stops in to buy some cups, he falls in love with Tom and Joy's son's macaroni art on the wall, believing it to be Tom's painting (even after Tom explains several times that he did not make it.) Tom must then duplicate the style of the painting for Jefferton's upcoming 30th Anniversary Celebration.
15	2	"Bass Fest"	Tim Heidecker and Eric Wareheim	Tim Heidecker, Eric Wareheim, and Bob Odenkirk	Sean Hayes	June 12, 2006	217
After his adult school field trip reveals cracks in the Richardson Family Dam (which Tom refers to as "The Darn"), Tom goes on a mission to halt the upcoming Jefferton Bass Fest. With The Mayor, bass musician Wizzard, Joy and his children standing in the way, Tom launches a protest canoe to warn the town.
16	3	"Jeffy the Sea Serpent"	Tim Heidecker and Eric Wareheim	Tim Heidecker, Eric Wareheim, Bob Odenkirk, Tom Scharpling, and Jon Wurster	Fred Armisen	June 19, 2006	227
To help attract tourists to Jefferton, Tom and The mayor invent a fake sea serpent that they name Jeffy. But as Tom gets locked inside the machine and it loses control, he ends up driving it into a group of tourists, killing and injuring them. The Mayor forgets that it's all fake, and goes on a quest (with the help of Phillip Priest, serpent enthusiast) to take Jeffy down.
17	4	"White Collarless"	Tim Heidecker and Eric Wareheim	Tim Heidecker, Eric Wareheim, and Bob Odenkirk	Louie Anderson, Michael Hitchcock	June 26, 2006	226
With Tom looking for a job to impress his sons at their school career day, he is hired by The Mayor to be the CEO of the Department of Special Projects. However, as he reports to work, he is brought down into a mine, where he (along with hundreds of Louie Andersons) are digging for something the Mayor is keeping secret. Tom wonders whether he should quit his bad job and be jobless, or lie to his son to impress the school on career day.
18	5	"Wrestling"	Tim Heidecker and Eric Wareheim	Tim Heidecker, Eric Wareheim, Bob Odenkirk, Tom Scharpling, and Jon Wurster	Gary Busey	July 3, 2006	216
When the Jefferton wrestling coach has a stroke and collapses, Tom is called upon by the Mayor to coach the team. Tom quickly discovers the wrestlers "bulked up" because of their use of Flaxamax, a dangerously addictive weight enhancer made for racehorses. Unfortunately, Tom gets addicted to Flaxamax himself, gains major weight, and puts the town in danger of being disqualified in their upcoming wrestling meet.
19	6	"Saxman"	Tim Heidecker and Eric Wareheim	Tim Heidecker, Eric Wareheim, Bob Odenkirk, and Doug Lussenhop	Tom Kenny, Robert Loggia	July 10, 2006	222
The Mayor hires a homeless saxophonist who plays smooth jazz and is managed by Tom, to perform at the Grand Opening of a Waterbed Galleria. Things go awry when Tom hosts the Saxman at his house and the Saxman begins pushing the limits of proper hospitality.
20	7	"Spray a Carpet or Rug"	Tim Heidecker and Eric Wareheim	Tim Heidecker, Eric Wareheim, and Bob Odenkirk	Judd Hirsch	July 17, 2006	218
The Mayor's obsession with getting rid of the Lawnmower Man ends with the Mayor hiring Tom to replace all the grass in the park with spray-on instant carpet. The carpet reacts in the sunlight, killing thousands and sending Tom to jail, and then on to Hell courtesy of Judd Hirsch.
21	8	"Surprise Party"	Tim Heidecker and Eric Wareheim	Tim Heidecker, Eric Wareheim, and Bob Odenkirk	Brian Posehn	July 24, 2006	215
After buying his kids a Bounce-House, Tom's funds are depleted. Unfortunately, Gibbons's birthday is fast-approaching (which falls on the same day as Tom's), and Gibbons is anticipating a new $800 sword signed by the dojo where it was forged. Tom stoops to new lows by stealing from kids wishing for dreams.
22	9	"C.N.E."	Tim Heidecker and Eric Wareheim	Tim Heidecker, Eric Wareheim, and Bob Odenkirk	Michael Ian Black, Zach Galifianakis	July 31, 2006	219
After Tom is having problems with frequent wet dreams involving him and a woman who looks like his wife in a field of ponies, he sees a doctor (Zach Galifianakis). After his insurance runs out, he sees Dr. Michael Ian Black. Tom becomes a celebrity to achieve the pills to help with his Chronic Nocturnal Emissions (CNE). But will the fame go to Tom's head?
23	10	"Friendship Alliance"	Tim Heidecker and Eric Wareheim	Tim Heidecker, Eric Wareheim, and Bob Odenkirk	John C. Reilly, Brian Posehn	August 7, 2006	230
Tom makes a new friend on a MySpace-esque site entitled Friendship Alliance, in John C. Reilly. After John accidentally shoots Gibbons, madness ensues, as Tom and Gibbons are held captive by the panicked Reilly, with the Mayor desperately on the hunt to find Gibbons.
24	11	"Zoo Trouble"	Tim Heidecker and Eric Wareheim	Tim Heidecker, Eric Wareheim, and Bob Odenkirk	Brian Doyle-Murray	August 14, 2006	220
Attendance at the local Jefferton Zoo is down, due to Bernie Fusterillio's Real Live Animal Experience opening across the street. Tom and the Mayor look to renovate the Zoo, but while he is patrolling it at night, Tom is grabbed by Michael Davidson, the ape who is the star of the zoo. Michael talks to Tom, telling him that he has been selected to free all the animals in the zoo, or else there will be dire consequences. Tom must convince City Council that it must be done, or he must go back to Michael Davidson and tell him he failed. But, not all is what it seems.
25	12	"The Layover"	Tim Heidecker and Eric Wareheim	Tim Heidecker, Eric Wareheim, and Bob Odenkirk	Bob Balaban	August 21, 2006	221
Tom's father is on a layover for 11 minutes, during which Tom has an in-depth itenerary of things for them to do. Unfortunately, they run into The Mayor, who needs his scooter repaired immediately, and Tom is the only person who can bring it to Scootertons. The Mayor takes Tom's father to Fishanellis for lunch, where Tom's father becomes very uncomfortable with being with The Mayor, but attempts to sell him a fish freezer anyway. Time is running out as Tom must get his father back to the airport before his flight leaves, but The Mayor once again stands in the way.
26	13	"Couple's Therapy"	Tim Heidecker and Eric Wareheim	Tim Heidecker, Eric Wareheim, and Bob Odenkirk	Janeane Garofalo, Garry Shandling	August 28, 2006	224
Tom embarks on a couple's cruise in an attempt to bond better with his wife Joy, only to find that the Mayor also on board (also trying to bond better with Joy). Joy of course, is not on the cruise, having plans of her own.
27	14	"Glass Eyes"	Tim Heidecker and Eric Wareheim	Tim Heidecker, Eric Wareheim, and Bob Odenkirk	Dave Foley	September 4, 2006	214
Tom needs the Mayor's help to get the traditional Jefferton father-son barrel goat hunt back on.
28	15	"Undercover"	Tim Heidecker and Eric Wareheim	Tim Heidecker, Eric Wareheim, Bob Odenkirk, Tom Scharpling, and Jon Wurster	Michael Cera, Zach Galifianakis	September 11, 2006	228
After children in Jefferton are discovered having high levels of starch, Tom goes undercover (at the urging of the mayor) as a student at the school to see what the problem is. Shortly after getting surgery to look and sound younger, Tom joins the school, only to start falling in with a bad crowd. The Mayor forgets that Tom is undercover, leaving Tom alone to deal with the issue.
29	16	"Puddins"	Tim Heidecker and Eric Wareheim	Tim Heidecker, Eric Wareheim, and Bob Odenkirk	Paul Reubens, Brian Posehn	September 18, 2006	229
Tom's stepson Brindon eats himself to death on his birthday, sending Tom into a deep depression. Tom tries to cope with the death in many ways, but none of them help him feel better. As Tom visits his son's favorite dessert restaurant, Puddins, The Mayor convinces Tom to go on a Puddins fast to commemorate his son. As Tom only eats Puddins for weeks, his life only gets worse, as he gets kicked out of his house and starts living in a dumpster, losing his mind.
30	17	"Joy's Ex"	Tim Heidecker and Eric Wareheim	Tim Heidecker, Eric Wareheim, and Bob Odenkirk	Todd Barry	September 25, 2006	225
When Sol, another one of Joy's ex-husbands, is staying over at Tom's house, Tom ends up going to Jefferton Castle with The Mayor for a "Weekend Retreat" party. Unfortunately, Tom and the Mayor are the only ones who are at the party. They sit around the mayor's depressing unfurnished condo and play Cock O'Block (a robotic Cockfighting Game). Sol shows up to join them, bringing his collection of intoxicating didgeridoos, resulting in a deep spiritual journey for all three men.

== International broadcast ==
In Canada, Tom Goes to the Mayor previously aired on Teletoon's Teletoon at Night block and later G4's Adult Digital Distraction block. The series currently airs on the Canadian version of Adult Swim.

== Home media ==
On April 3, 2007, the entire series was released on DVD. Tom Goes to the Mayor is also available on iTunes.

DVD name	Release date	Ep #	Additional information
Tom Goes to the Mayor – The Complete Series – Businessman's Edition	April 3, 2007	30	This three disc boxset contains all 30 episodes from the show's first and second seasons. Bonus features include Commentary on every episode, Making of featurette, Married News, Deleted Scenes, Music Jukebox, Deleted Art Slideshow.
