= Adult Digital Distraction =

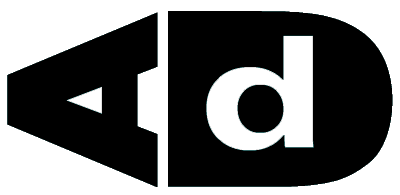
- Adult Digital Distraction logo
- Network: G4 Canada
- Launched: June 9, 2009
- Closed: November 2012
- Country of origin: Canada
- Headquarters: Toronto, Ontario, Canada
- Format: Adult Animation, Other
- Running time: Weeknights at 8.00pm ET / 11.00pm ET / 2.00am ET
- Official website: Adult Digital Distraction

Adult Digital Distraction (ADd) was a block that aired on G4 Canada. Similar to Adult Swim and Teletoon at Night, Adult Digital Distraction aired mature comedies. It parallels the American counterpart's Midnight Spank block. Its programming consist of Adult Swim shows (some previously aired on Teletoon at Night), syndicated sitcoms and G4 original series. In late 2011, the block had been discontinued due to pressure from the CRTC. However, in early 2012, the Adult Digital Distraction block had been relaunched, only for the block to be discontinued seven months later.

== Former programs ==
- Aqua Teen Hunger Force (now airing on Adult Swim)
- Check It Out! with Dr. Steve Brule (now airing on Adult Swim)
- Childrens Hospital (now airing on Adult Swim)
- Delocated (now airing on Adult Swim)
- The Drinky Crow Show (now airing on Adult Swim)
- Eagleheart (now airing on Adult Swim)
- Fat Guy Stuck in Internet (now airing on Adult Swim)
- Freaks and Geeks
- Happy Tree Friends
- Harvey Birdman, Attorney at Law (now airing on Adult Swim)
- The IT Crowd
- Mary Shelley's Frankenhole (now airing on Adult Swim)
- Metalocalypse (now airing on Adult Swim)
- NTSF:SD:SUV:: (now airing on Adult Swim)
- The Office
- Squidbillies (now airing on Adult Swim)
- Superjail! (now airing on Adult Swim)
- Tim and Eric Awesome Show, Great Job! (now airing on Adult Swim)
- Titan Maximum (now airing on Adult Swim)
- Tom Goes to the Mayor (now airing on Adult Swim)
- Undeclared
- The Venture Bros. (now airing on Adult Swim)
- Web Soup (Moved to daytime slot)
- Xavier: Renegade Angel (now airing on Adult Swim)

== See also ==
- G4 Canada
