= Al's Brain =

2009 film

- Poster for the film
- Directed by: "Weird Al" Yankovic
- Written by: "Weird Al" Yankovic
- Starring: "Weird Al" Yankovic
- Cinematography: Peter Anderson
- Music by: Jim West
- Production company: Orange County Fair
- Release date: July 10, 2009 (Orange County)
- Running time: 10 minutes
- Country: United States
- Language: English
- Budget: $2.5 million

External videos
- AL'S BRAIN – A 3-D Journey Through the Human Brain with "Weird Al" Yankovic (@alyankovic, August 31, 2026)

Al's Brain (or Al's Brain: A 3-D Journey Through the Human Brain) is a 2009 American 10-minute 3D educational comedy film directed and written by "Weird Al" Yankovic. It was shown at the Orange County Fair, California in July–August 2009.

== Plot ==
"Weird Al" Yankovic teaches about the brain and how it functions.

== Cast ==
- "Weird Al" Yankovic as a fictionalized version of himself and Phineas Gage
- Billy West as Norm the Owl
- Patton Oswalt as co-worker
- Thomas Lennon as co-worker
- Fabio as second man on the street
- Paul McCartney as last man on the street
- Tim Heidecker and Eric Wareheim as brain stretchers
- Bob Bancroft as Norm Koslovsky
- Michael William Arnold as Timmy

== Music video ==
The last few minutes of the film comprise the music video for "The Brain Song".

== Release ==
The film was released to the public at the Orange County Fair 2009 airing from July 16 to August 15. The film was later released on YouTube on August 31, 2026, with Yankovic declaring that the film is no longer "lost media".

== Home media ==
The original song "The Brain Song" was released on the Medium Rarities album, exclusive to the 2017 box set Squeeze Box.
