= Abso Lutely Productions =

American television production company

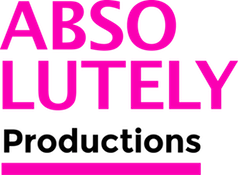
- Type: Private
- Industry: Production company
- Founded: 2007; 19 years ago
- Founder: Tim Heidecker; Eric Wareheim; Dave Kneebone
- Headquarters: Woodland Hills, Los Angeles, California, U.S.
- Key people: Tim Heidecker (president, CEO); Eric Wareheim (Secretary, CFO); Dave Kneebone (vice president)
- Products: Tom Goes to the Mayor; Tim and Eric Awesome Show, Great Job! Check It Out! with Dr. Steve Brule; Tim and Eric's Billion Dollar Movie; The Eric Andre Show; Nathan for You; On Cinema
- Website: absolutelyproductions.com

Abso Lutely Productions is an American film and television production company owned by actors Tim Heidecker and Eric Wareheim and producer Dave Kneebone. It is known for producing TV shows such as Tom Goes to the Mayor; Nathan for You; The Eric Andre Show; Tim and Eric Awesome Show, Great Job!; and Check It Out! with Dr. Steve Brule.

Tim Heidecker's father has been featured in the company's vanity logo since 2006. Sourced from a home video with a June 28, 1991 time stamp, he says, "Abso-lutely," providing inspiration for the company name. This was in response to Tim (then 15 years old) asking him to sum up his vacation in two words.

== Filmography ==
=== Films ===
Films from Abso Lutely Productions
Year	Title
2012	Tim and Eric's Billion Dollar Movie
2019	Mister America
2022	This Place Rules

=== Television shows ===
Television shows from Abso Lutely Productions
Year	Title	Network
2004	Tom Goes to the Mayor	Adult Swim
2007–2010	Tim and Eric Awesome Show, Great Job!	Adult Swim
2010–2016	Check It Out! with Dr. Steve Brule	Adult Swim
2011	Jon Benjamin Has a Van	Comedy Central
2012–2023	The Eric André Show	Adult Swim
2012–2016	Comedy Bang! Bang!	IFC
2013–2017	Nathan for You	Comedy Central
2013–2015	Hot Package	Adult Swim
2013–2014	The Birthday Boys	IFC
2013–2017	Tim & Eric's Bedtime Stories	Adult Swim
2014–2020	Decker	Adult Swim.com / Adult Swim
2014–2017	Review	Comedy Central
2015	W/ Bob & David	Netflix
2018	Ghost Story Club	truTV
2018–2020	Magic for Humans	Netflix
2020	The Dress Up Gang	TBS
2020	Beef House	Adult Swim
2020	Moonbase 8	Showtime
2022	Chad and JT Go Deep	Netflix
2025	Caleb Hearon: Model Comedian	HBO Max
2026	Oobah: Scams for a Better Tomorrow	HBO

=== Television specials ===
Television specials from Abso Lutely Productions
Year	Title	Network
2012	Dangerously Delicious: Paid Advertisement	Adult Swim
2012	The Eric Andre New Year's Eve Spooktacular!	Adult Swim
2014	Dinner with Friends with Brett Gelman and Friends	Adult Swim
2015	Dinner with Family with Brett Gelman and Brett Gelman's Family	Adult Swim
2015	Bagboy	Adult Swim
2016	Brett Gelman's Dinner in America	Adult Swim
2017	Innovation Makers: The Coyote Suit	Adult Swim
2018	Mother, May I Dance with Mary Jane's Fist?	Adult Swim
2018	Dayworld	Adult Swim
2018	Flayaway	Adult Swim
2019	KRFT Punk's Political Party	Adult Swim
2020	Piggy	Adult Swim

=== Television pilots ===
Television pilots from Abso Lutely Productions
Year	Title	Network
2009	The New Big Ball with Neil Hamburger	Adult Swim
2013	Candy Ranch	Adult Swim
2017	Art Thiefs	tbs (Super Deluxe)
2020	What the Hell Is Going On?? with Vic Berger	tbs (Super Deluxe)

=== Web series, shorts, and sketches ===
Web work from Abso Lutely Productions
Year	Title	Network/Platform
2002	Tom Goes to the Mayor	timanderic.com
2003	Tom Goes to the Mayor Returns	timanderic.com
2004	My 2 Fathers	Channel 101
2006	Tim and Eric: The Podcast	timanderic.com
2007–2008	Tim and Eric Nite Live!	Super Deluxe
2008	Steven and Stephen	Atom.com
2009	A Vodka Movie	for Absolut Vodka
2009	Gettin' It Dunn with Richard Dunn	Adult Swim
2010	Morning Prayer with Skott and Behr (Funny or Die Presents)	HBO
2010	Father and Son (Funny or Die Presents)	HBO
2010	Just 3 Boyz (Funny or Die Presents)	HBO
2010	The Terrys (Funny or Die Presents)	HBO
2010	John and Will's Animal Choices (Funny or Die Presents)	HBO
2012	Reggie Makes Music	IFC
2012–present	On Cinema	Thing X / Adult Swim / HEI Network
2013	Tim & Eric's Go Pro Show	Jash
2013	Hamper's Pre-Natal Life Coaching	Jash
2013	Goatee	Jash
2013	Tim's Kitchen Tips	Jash
2013	Dr. Wareheim	Jash
2014	Esther with Hot Chicks	MTV (other)
2015	Broken People	Comedy Central
2017	Eric Andre Interviews the Hot Babes of Instagram	Adult Swim
2017	555	Vimeo
2018	Mutant Powers	Mashable
2018	An Emmy for Megan	anemmyformegan.com
2018	The Passage	tbs
2019–present	This Is Branchburg	Apple Podcasts/Spotify/Stitcher/SoundCloud
2019	Our Bodies with Tim & Eric	Adult Swim
2019	SCUM	Adult Swim
2019	I Love David	Adult Swim
2019	Tim & Eric Qu?z	Adult Swim
2020	Metolius Tutorials: Sick Horse	Adult Swim
2020	Metolius Tutorials: 3D House	Adult Swim
2020	An Evening With Tim Heidecker	YouTube
