= Tim and Eric's Billion Dollar Movie =

2012 film by Tim & Eric

- Theatrical release poster
- Directed by: Tim Heidecker; Eric Wareheim
- Written by: Tim Heidecker; Eric Wareheim; Jonathan Krisel; Doug Lussenhop; Jon Mugar
- Produced by: Will Ferrell; Adam McKay; Dave Kneebone; Tim Heidecker; Eric Wareheim
- Starring: Tim Heidecker; Eric Wareheim; Zach Galifianakis; Will Ferrell; John C. Reilly
- Narrated by: Michael Gross
- Cinematography: Rachel Morrison
- Edited by: Daniel Haworth; Doug Lussenhop
- Music by: Davin Wood
- Production companies: 2929 Productions; Gary Sanchez Productions; Funny or Die; Abso Lutely Films
- Distributed by: Magnet Releasing
- Release dates: January 20, 2012 (Sundance Film Festival); March 2, 2012 (U.S.)
- Running time: 85 minutes
- Country: United States
- Language: English
- Budget: $3 million
- Box office: $201,436

Tim and Eric's Billion Dollar Movie is a 2012 American comedy film starring, co-written, co-produced, and directed by the comedy duo Tim & Eric (Tim Heidecker and Eric Wareheim) in their feature directorial debuts. The plot follows Heidecker and Wareheim, playing fictionalized versions of themselves, who are forced to re-open an abandoned mall to pay back a wasted billion-dollar loan. The supporting cast includes Zach Galifianakis, Will Ferrell, John C. Reilly, Ray Wise, Twink Caplan, Robert Loggia, William Atherton, Jeff Goldblum, Bob Odenkirk, and Will Forte.

The film premiered at the 2012 Sundance Film Festival and was released in theaters on March 2, 2012, before being released to iTunes and on-demand January 27, 2013. It received generally negative reviews from critics upon its original release.

== Plot ==
Tim Heidecker and Eric Wareheim are two filmmakers who are given a record-setting $1 billion budget to make their first movie. The funds are provided by the powerful corporation Schlaaang, Inc. However, the two waste almost all their budget on non-film expenses such as personal makeovers, ten-course lunches, the purchase of real diamonds, and an exorbitant weekly salary for their personal shopper and spiritual guru Jim Joe Kelly. Ultimately, their finished film, Bonjour, Diamond Jim, is only three minutes long; a bland romance, the film stars Johnny Depp (actually an impersonator cast by mistake) as the diamond-studded-suit-wearing Diamond Jim, who proposes to a waitress in the streets of Paris.

The Schlaaang, Inc. executives, furious at having their funds squandered and the exceptionally low quality of their movie, hold Tim and Eric personally responsible for paying back the $1 billion they were entrusted with and threaten legal action. Tim and Eric are forced to fire Jim Joe, who transforms into a spirit. After a night of self-destructive partying, Tim and Eric see an advertisement about the sale of the dilapidated S'Wallow Valley Shopping Mall and Pizza Court, where owner Damien Weebs repeatedly claims that whoever buys and runs the mall will make a billion dollars in profit. They decide to reinvent themselves as businessmen, rebranding as “Dobis P. R.” and depart Los Angeles to purchase the mall and make back their debt.

The pair arrive at the S'Wallow Valley Mall and are given control over it by Weebs, who ditches them immediately after. Now co-owners, Tim and Eric soon face many professional challenges while renovating the mall, including vagrants and squatters, bizarre stores, and a wolf that stalks the food court. They also encounter unusual people such as chronically ill man-child (and Weebs’ adopted son) Taquito, irate and obstinate shop owner Allen Bishopman, and meek “used toilet paper warehouse” owner Reggie Pish, whose son Jeffrey is promptly adopted by Tim. Eventually, it becomes apparent the mall likely cannot make $1 billion as promised.

Personal tensions arise between Tim and Eric over Eric’s infatuation with shop owner Katie Hill. Tim poisons Eric while he goes on a date with her and is brought to the mall’s “Shrim Alternative Healing Center”. Tim then persuades Katie to sleep with him as Eric is “treated” with a diarrhea bath that eventually submerges him. The next morning, Eric finds Tim has slept with Katie and fights him. Afterward, at the urging of the spirit of Jim Joe Kelly, Tim and Eric make up and come to an understanding of their respective actions.

Despite their best efforts, including killing the wolf in the food court (resulting in the death of Taquito), the newly reopened S’Wallow Valley Mall fails to generate the necessary $1 billion in revenue. They are eventually discovered by Schlaaang, Inc. executives after Bishopman turns them in. After a dramatic shootout in which Reggie, Bishopman, Katie, and Jeffrey are killed, Tim and Eric manage to kill the executives; narration explains both were later sentenced to death for murder.

It is revealed that the preceding events were actually a film the two were showing to Steven Spielberg, who pronounces it the greatest movie ever made. Tim and Eric then celebrate with their Awesome Show co-stars.

== Cast ==
- Tim Heidecker as a fictionalized version of himself
- Eric Wareheim as a fictionalized version of himself
- Zach Galifianakis as Jim Joe Kelly
- Will Ferrell as Damien Weebs
- Will Forte as Allen Bishopman
- John C. Reilly as Taquito
- Jeff Goldblum as Chef Goldblum
- Bob Ross as himself
- Robert Loggia as Tommy Schlaaang
- William Atherton as Earle Swinter
- Ray Wise as Dr. Doone Struts
- Twink Caplan as Katie
- Bob Odenkirk as Schlaaang Announcer (voice)
- Noah Spencer as Jeffrey
- Mary Bly as Mrs. Heidecker
- Lillian Adams as Mrs. Wareheim
- Erica Durance as French Waitress
- Sunshine Lee and Palmer Scott as Shrim Gods
- John Downey III as Cornell
- Todd Wagner as Hobo
- Ronnie Rodriguez as Johnny Depp
- Howie Slater as Steven Spielberg
- Mark Cuban as himself
- Michael Gross as Narrator

Several cast members of Tim & Eric's television series Awesome Show, Great Job! and Check It Out! with Dr. Steve Brule appear as themselves - A. D. Miles, Ron Lynch, James Quall, Robert Axelrod, David Liebe Hart, Tennessee Winston Luke, Bob Druwing, Carol Kraft, Michael Q. Schmidt, Ron Austar, Warren Stearns, Ron Stark, Chuck Spitler, Sire, Doug Lussenhop, and Jay Mawhinney.

== Production ==
Portions of the film were shot in the Coachella Valley, California, and Palm Springs at the abandoned Desert Fashion Plaza which was used for S'wallow Valley Mall. Tim and Eric had originally planned to use an entire town but for budgetary reasons it was scaled back to a mall. The idea for a dying shopping center came from Monroeville Mall (of Dawn of the Dead fame) and Hunt Valley Mall in Maryland. Like the fictional mall, Hunt Valley was in fact redeveloped from top to bottom except the interior walkways have been converted to open-air and was successful upon its "grand reopening". The same went for Desert Fashion Plaza which was in the process of being de-malled and re-imagined as a new "Main Street" at the time filming began, lending authenticity to the setting.

Before the film's release Tim and Eric started the Billion Dollar Pledge asking fans and celebrities to support them by signing a document stating they would not illegally download the film, and also not to see its box office competition The Lorax. Stars who took part in the pledge ranged from comedians and actors Ben Stiller, Mark Proksch, Bob Odenkirk, Seth Green, Peter Serafinowicz, Todd Barry, Rashida Jones, and others, to musicians Weird Al Yankovic, Maynard James Keenan, Josh Groban, the Yeah Yeah Yeahs, and Maroon 5.

On January 1, 2021, Tim and Eric hosted a watch-along of Billion Dollar Movie. As part of it, they discussed the outline for the unproduced sequel, Trillion Dollar Movie, which would involve the duo being kidnapped by the dictator of an African country and forced to make a Saturday Night Live-style show.

== Release ==
The film premiered at the 2012 Sundance Film Festival in January 2012. In an interview, the duo deadpanned that the film was spliced together with out-takes from the DVD release of Rango.

=== Box office ===
Tim and Eric's Billion Dollar Movie opened to 24 theaters on March 2, 2012 and grossed $87,475 in its opening weekend, ranking at #42. It would go on for another 7 weeks before closing to only $201,436 in the domestic box office.

=== Home Media ===
Tim and Eric's Billion Dollar Movie released on DVD in Region 1 and Region 4, with the Region 4 release being distributed by Madman Entertainment. The film also released on Blu-Ray in North America.

=== Critical reception ===
Tim and Eric's Billion Dollar Movie received negative reviews from critics on its original release. The film ranking website Rotten Tomatoes rated the film "rotten", with 38% of the 73 critics sampled giving the film positive reviews, with an average score of 4.26/10. The website's critics consensus reads: "Tim & Eric's Billion Dollar Movie is on a gleeful quest to repulse audiences, but sometimes less is more with this sketchy duo." Metacritic, which uses a weighted average, assigned the film a score of 40 out of 100, based on 21 critics, indicating "mixed or average" reviews.

Variety gave the film a negative review, feeling that Tim and Eric "torture their purposefully inept, shortform sketch work into feature length...to diminishing returns" and that "fans of their Cartoon Network series or those simply familiar with the pair via YouTube will likely find the extended version of their pathos-and-pain-driven comedy hard to digest." The Hollywood Reporter gave the film a negative review, stating "Auds attuned to Tim & Eric's weird wavelength will find plenty of guffaws in the first half, but a plot this thin can't sustain comedy based on discomfort." The A.V. Club gave the film a B+ rating, opining that the film "feels genuinely dangerous and transgressive: it makes a virtue of going way too far because other comedies don't go far enough." Roger Ebert gave the film half a star out of 4 and said it was so bad, it wouldn't even qualify for a review in a book consisting solely of reviews of terrible movies (along the lines of his "Your Movie Sucks" editions).
