= Tim and Eric Awesome Show, Great Job! =

American sketch comedy series (2007–2010)

- Genre: Sketch comedy Surreal humor Cringe comedy Anti-humor; Comedy horror Satire; Black comedy
- Created by: Tim & Eric
- Starring: Tim Heidecker; Eric Wareheim
- Opening theme: "Awesome Show Theme" by Davin Wood and DJ Douggpound
- Composer: Davin Wood
- Country of origin: United States
- No. of seasons: 5
- No. of episodes: 50 (list of episodes)

Production
- Executive producers: Tim Heidecker; Eric Wareheim
- Producers: Jon Mugar; Dave Kneebone
- Running time: 11-22 minutes
- Production companies: Abso Lutely Productions; Williams Street

Original release
- Network: Adult Swim
- Release: February 11, 2007 – May 2, 2010

Related
- Check It Out! with Dr. Steve Brule; Tom Goes to the Mayor; Tim and Eric Nite Live!

Tim and Eric Awesome Show, Great Job! is an American sketch comedy television series created by Tim Heidecker and Eric Wareheim for Cartoon Network's nighttime programming block Adult Swim. It premiered on February 11, 2007, and originally ran until May 2, 2010. The show features surreal, dark and often satirical humor (at points anti-humor and cringe comedy), public-access television-style musical acts, bizarre faux-commercials with a unique editing and special effects style by Doug Lussenhop to make the show appear off-kilter.

The program features a wide range of performers, including regular guests Zach Galifianakis, John C. Reilly, Ray Wise, Bob Odenkirk, Will Forte, Maria Bamford, Jeff Goldblum, and "Weird Al" Yankovic, as well as an ensemble of alternative performers like Neil Hamburger, Tommy Wiseau, and David Liebe Hart, once popular stars like Karen Black, Frank Stallone, and Alan Thicke, porn stars, celebrity look-alikes, impressionists, and amateur actors found through Craigslist. The show also attracted a wide range of popular Hollywood talent for brief appearances, including Will Ferrell, Elisha Cuthbert, Andy Samberg, Jonah Hill, Ben Stiller, Paul Rudd, Ted Danson, Peter Cetera, and Josh Groban, among others. Heidecker and Wareheim have described the series as "the nightmare version of television".

== Premise ==
The show, which expands the genre of the live-action material featured in Heidecker and Wareheim's previous show, Tom Goes to the Mayor, consists of sketches, songs, and commercials. It features several characters and segments seen in Tom Goes to the Mayor, such as Gibbons, the "Channel 5 Married News Team", and the Cinco Corporation with its variety of inefficient and tasteless products. New recurring characters and sketches include "Uncle Muscles Hour", a public-access television variety program hosted by a gravelly-voiced "Weird Al" Yankovic and Channel 5 News Correspondent Dr. Steve Brule, played by John C. Reilly. The show featured a variety of celebrity cameos from actors, comedians, and musicians. The editing style takes its influence from such elements as infomercials, corporate training videos, and TV shopping channels, which are all satirized. The show gets darker in season 5, or "Season Cinco", which has a TV MA rating.

== Episodes ==
Season	Episodes	Originally released	
Season	Episodes	First released	Last released
1	10	February 11, 2007	April 15, 2007
2	10	November 18, 2007	January 27, 2008
3	10	July 27, 2008	September 28, 2008
4	10	February 9, 2009	April 12, 2009
5	10	February 28, 2010	May 2, 2010
Specials	2	December 5, 2010	August 27, 2017

== International broadcast ==
In Canada, Tim and Eric Awesome Show, Great Job! previously aired on CTV Comedy Channel (formerly The Comedy Network) and later G4's Adult Digital Distraction block. The series currently airs on the Canadian version of Adult Swim.

== Production ==
Halfway through the broadcasting of the first season, Adult Swim picked up Tim and Eric Awesome Show, Great Job! for another season ordering as many as 30 new episodes. The second season began airing on November 18, 2007. Season one was released on DVD in April, 2008. The third season began on July 27, 2008, and ended on September 28, 2008. Wareheim posted a MySpace bulletin October 1, 2008, announcing that as a "holiday surprise" season four would be airing in January 2009. The show was later renewed for a fifth season.

Speaking with Vanity Fair in July 2009, Wareheim said that season five (or "Season Cinco") would represent "a very dark side of the Awesome Show series. I think people are going to be very scared and very disturbed by it." He also noted that the pair draw equal humor from the awkwardness of The Office as they do from the awkwardness of David Lynch's films. The duo went on to state that they had begun an unconscious tradition by starting the first episode of seasons two, three, and four each with fecal-related fake commercials; they planned to "outdo" themselves on season five with a "diarrhea disease"-based commercial. The fifth season premiered on February 28, 2010. The series finale aired on May 2, 2010. On May 16, 2010, the spin-off Check it Out! premiered.

Heidecker and Wareheim acquired funding to shoot and air a one-hour special that aired on December 5, 2010, called The Tim and Eric Awesome Show, Great Job Chrimbus Special. Simultaneously, the duo released a list of dates and cities for their 2010 tour. Heidecker and Wareheim also announced plans for a movie, entitled Tim and Eric's Billion Dollar Movie, which was released online and on pay-per-view on January 27, 2012. In the film, the pair try to revitalize a run-down mall to pay off a billion-dollar debt.

The duo's Abso Lutely Productions signoff bumper features a video clip of Heidecker's father during a family vacation in 1991; when asked to sum the trip up in two words, he responded "Abso-lutely". The full clip can be found on their website, DVD, and on YouTube.

=== Music ===
The series' theme music was composed by Davin Wood, who had also composed the theme music for the earlier Tom Goes to the Mayor, and for related series Derek & Simon, American Misfits, Stupidface, and Check It Out! with Dr. Steve Brule.

On May 6, 2008, Williams Street Records released Awesome Record, Great Songs! Volume One, a compilation of songs from the first two seasons, and some covers and remixes by other artists. Williams Street also released Uncle Muscles Presents Casey and His Brother in July of that year, an EP featuring 11 songs sung by Heidecker in character as the late Casey Tatum.

=== Touring ===
One of Heidecker and Wareheim's first live performances incorporating characters from Awesome Show was Muscles for Bones, a spoof telethon seeking bones for Richard Dunn. This was performed at Troubadour nightclub in West Hollywood, California. Major portions of this live performance were incorporated into season 3, episode 8 "Muscles for Bones". An extended version of this show can be found as an extra on the Season 3 DVD. The extended version features performances not seen on the original TV episode, from performers such as Pierre and Michael Q. Schmidt. Prior to the beginning of seasons two and three, Heidecker and Wareheim combined "Tim and Eric Awesome Show, Great Job!" Live in Vegas (2007). The second of these, listed as season 3 episode 0, shared their 2008 cross-country tour and was titled Awesome Tour Live 2008.

== Reception ==
Tim and Eric Awesome Show Great Job! has had a wide range of reviews with many differing in opinion. Columnist for The New York Times Dave Itzkoff writes, "'Awesome Show' revels in an aesthetic of awkwardness." And also adds, "To populate their twisted universe they frequently cast average-looking actors (and nonactors) recruited from Web sites like Craigslist, who bring an additional layer of deliberate amateurishness to their skits."

James Norton from Flak Magazine says, "If Adult Swim is the bleeding edge of TV comedy, Tim and Eric's Awesome Show, Great Job! [sic] is the bleeding edge of the bleeding edge."

He adds, "The program has been much hated-upon by the Adult Swim fan base ... But the program also represents a foray into one of the most dangerous and exciting realms of the comedy world: sheer individualistic creativity."

A reappraisal of the show in a 2020 New York Times column dubbed the show "sketch comedy at its most abrasive, bizarre and, for some reason, endearing."

== Spin-offs ==
While doing press for the first season of the program, Heidecker and Wareheim told an interviewer that they had aspirations to create a spinoff featuring Awesome Show regular Richard Dunn: "It's just him interviewing people like The Charlie Rose Show. We would love to produce that. No one would ever watch it."

Using characters and skits from Awesome Show, Heidecker and Wareheim (via their Abso Lutely production company) created an online-only show called Tim and Eric Nite Live!, originally broadcast in aired on November 18, 2007, on the Adult Swim.

In July 2008, The New York Times reported that an Awesome Show spin-off, Check It Out!, with Steve Brule, would air on Adult Swim beginning sometime in 2009. The show parodies local newscasts, and as Heidecker briefly described it: "It's like his half-hour to go around town and interview the local beer-maker or whatever." The show will have an episode run time of approximately 11 minutes, and it will feature John C. Reilly reprising his role as Dr. Steve Brule. According to Heidecker, Reilly had the original idea of giving the Dr. Steve character an entire show. Vanity Fair reported that the program would begin airing on August 23, 2009; however, the program did not air on that date, and LA Weekly reported in September 2009 that Check It Out! was "forthcoming." The first episode aired May 16, 2010, and the last on June 20, 2010, with a total of six episodes. The show returned with six more episodes, the first airing March 18, 2012, and the last on April 12, 2012. The show has managed two more seasons also consisting of six episodes, which aired in 2014 and 2016.

In the same July 2008 New York Times article, it was reported that the duo was in the process of developing a surreal game show series starring Neil Hamburger, titled The New Big Ball with Neil Hamburger. Wareheim described it as a mix between "bizarre Japanese game shows and The Price Is Right." In late July 2009, Neil Hamburger posted a blog on Myspace stating that a pilot had been filmed, but that Adult Swim was not satisfied and had "pulled the plug on the project." As of November 8, 2013, the pilot has been uploaded to the official Adult Swim website.

== Home media ==
All five seasons and the Chrimbus Special have been released on DVD in Region 1 and 4 with distribution for the latter being handled by Madman Entertainment. The Chrimbus Special was released as a standalone DVD, and like seasons four and five, have become a rarity due to them no longer being in print. Only the first and second seasons have been released on DVD in Region 2.

DVD	Original year of broadcast	Region 1 release date	Region 2 release date	Region 4 release date
Season 1	2007	April 22, 2008	April 27, 2009	June 11, 2008
Season 2	2007–08	February 10, 2009	August 2, 2010	June 24, 2009
Season 3	2008	August 4, 2009	—N/a	December 2, 2009
Season 4	2009	September 14, 2010	—N/a	December 1, 2010
Season 5	2010	May 17, 2011	—N/a	November 28, 2012
Chrimbus Special	2010	December 15, 2010 (Out of Print)	—N/a	—N/a

The series was available on HBO Max starting from September 2020. However, it was removed in August 2025

== See also ==
- Beef House
- Check It Out! with Dr. Steve Brule
- Tim & Eric's Bedtime Stories
- Tom Goes to the Mayor
