= David Liebe Hart =

American entertainer

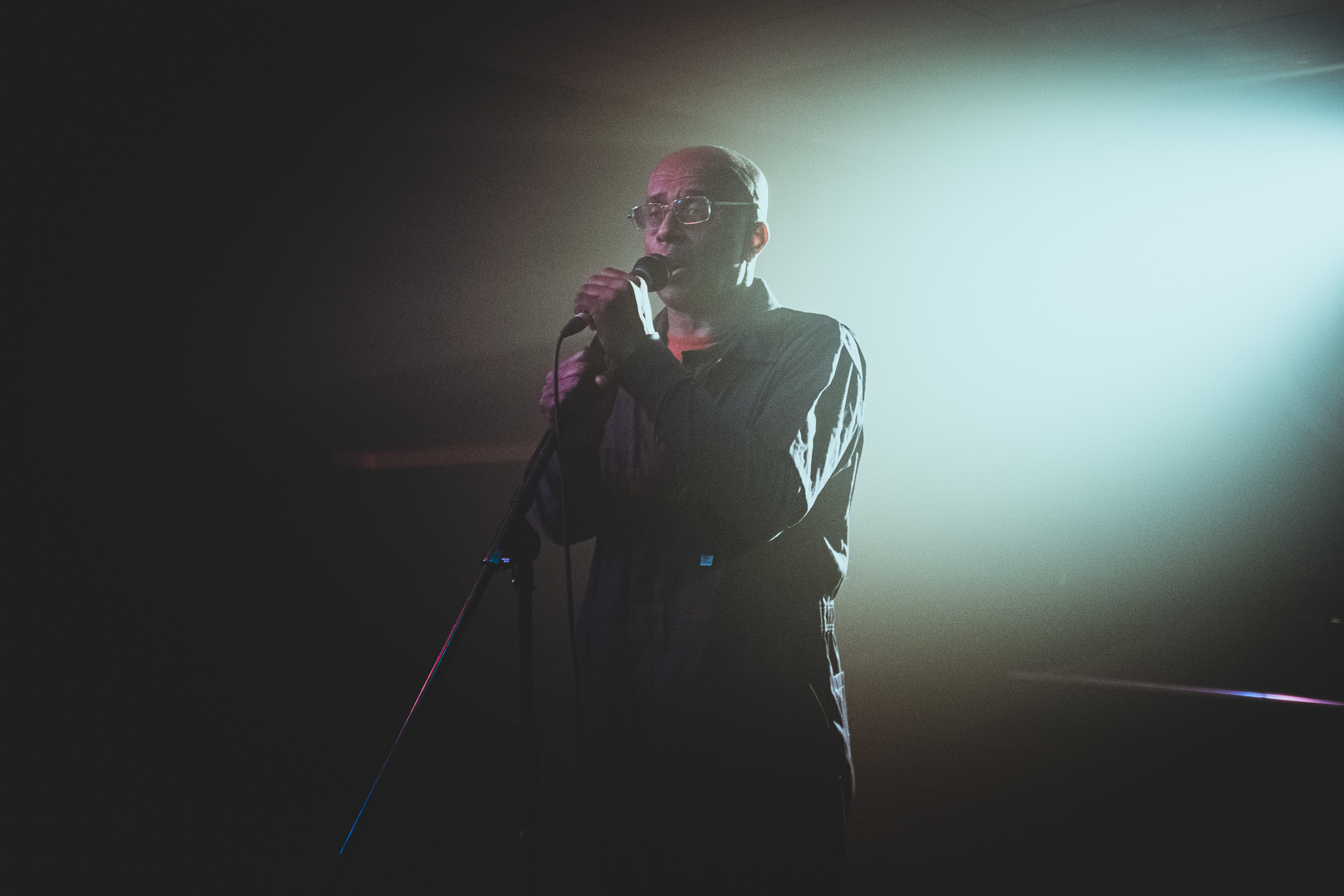
- Hart performing in London, Ontario
- Born: David Nkrumah Liebe Unger Hart; April 19, 1957 (age 69); Chicago, Illinois, United States
- Other names: D. L. Hart, Daniel Jungle Hart, David Unger Hart, David King Liebe Hart, David Nkrumah Liebe Hart
- Occupations: Street performer, musician, puppeteer, actor, painter, artist
- Years active: 1977–present
- Known for: The Junior Christian Science Bible Lesson Program; Tim and Eric Awesome Show, Great Job! Chip The Black Boy; I Love David
- Website: artbyliebehart.com

David Nkrumah Liebe Unger Hart, also credited as D. L. Hart, (born April 19, 1957) is an American outsider artist, musician, painter, puppeteer and actor. He is best known for his appearances on Adult Swim's Tim and Eric Awesome Show, Great Job!, performing bizarre puppetry and singing in a variety of voice characterizations. He is also known in the Los Angeles area for his role as a puppeteer on The Junior Christian Science Bible Lesson Program, a local public-access television cable TV program, and for performing with his puppet "Doug the Dog" just outside the Hollywood Bowl and Los Angeles Music Center after shows, where he is known to many concert goers simply as the "puppet man". Outside of the Tim & Eric universe, David has appeared in a number of cult and indie films such as The People's Joker, and Vampire Zombies... from Space! He has also been known at times as David Hart, David Unger Hart, David King Liebe Hart and DL Hart.

== Career ==
During an interview with Jimmy Kimmel, he stated he first developed his passion for puppeteering upon attending church Sunday school in his youth. He claims to have gotten his start in Hollywood performing with comedian Robin Williams and from making an appearance on The Gong Show in 1977. In 1990 he appeared on Golden Girls and in 1993 on Wings.

Hart has frequently appeared on television shows The Del Talk Show, Tim and Eric Awesome Show, Great Job!, and various other Abso Lutely productions and independent films. In 2004, David Hart was featured in the documentary Public Access Hollywood. He made an appearance on The Daily Show with Jon Stewart in 2004 and again 2009, as well as on Jimmy Kimmel Live! in 2004. He also appeared in a commentary on Tim And Eric Awesome Show, Great Job! Season One DVD. Throughout late April and early May 2008 he performed live as part of Tim and Eric's Awesome Tour 2008. In 2014 Hart appeared prominently in the independent feature film White Cop. In 2018, Hart appeared in the crowd sourced remake of Shrek, Shrek Retold, in which he performs the song Hallelujah, originally composed by Leonard Cohen.

In 2019 David created a series called I Love David, directed by Vera Drew, who would also go on to direct him in 2022's The People's Joker. In 2024 David appeared as Nosferatu in the feature film Vampire Zombies... from Space!

=== Filmography ===
- Tim & Eric Awesome Show, Great Job! (2007 - 2010) as Himself
- Check it Out! with Dr. Steve Brule (2010 - 2017) as Himself
- Tim & Eric's Billion Dollar Movie (2012) as Himself
- White Cop (2014) as Mayor Dennis
- Bagboy (2015) as Himself / Dog
- Shrek Retold (2018) as Himself
- I Love David (2019) as Himself
- Celebrity Home Tours (2020) as Himself
- The People's Joker (2022) as Ra's al Ghul
- Vampire Zombies... from Space! (2024) as Nosferatu

== Music ==
Hart writes his own music, mostly about religion, aliens, women, trains, and his tragic love life. For six years he teamed up with his friend and fellow public-access television host Adam Papagan to create music together, with Hart writing lyrics and singing, and Papagan creating the music. They created four full albums and an EP. Since 2014, Hart has been collaborating and performing with producer/composer Jonah Mociun (AKA Th' Mole), developing a more electronic-oriented and carefully sculpted sound. With Mociun, Hart has released the mixtape Go Into The Light and the Teleportation Thru Space EP, with an official album, Astronaut, slated for release in January, 2015. Hart's songs from Tim and Eric are also featured on Awesome Record, Great Songs!.

David Hart has been known to sell an album titled Christian Hymns And Songs Of Praise at shows during the Tim and Eric Awesome Tours in 2008 and 2009. In Spring 2011, Hart and Papagan toured the East and West Coast with a newly formed band that played punk music exclusively, including new interpretations of their older material. The Best of David and Adam, a compilation cassette tape/download featuring music from David and Adam's five albums, was released by Cellar Hits in 2011.

=== Discography ===
==== Solo ====
- Christian Hymns and Songs of Praise (2004)
- Christian Hymns and Songs of Praise Pt. II (2004)
- Songs All About Advent at Christmas (2004)
- Christian Hymns and Songs of Praise Pt. III (2014)
- Go into the Light (2014)
- Teleportation thru Space (2014)
- Astronaut (2015)

==== With Tragic Club ====
- Good Morning, Have A Good Day (2023)

==== With Adam Papagan ====
- Public Access (April 2008)
- New Songs Improvised Live: 6-05-08 (January 2009)
- Trains of The Past and Present (December 2009)
- Monsters (March 2010)
- Split EP (with Power Animal) (late-2010)
- The David Liebe Hart Hymn Book (May 2011)
- The Best of David and Adam (October 2011)
- The David Liebe Hart Band EP (August 2013)

==== Features ====
- Tim And Eric – Awesome Record, Great Songs! (2008)

== Personal life ==
Hart was born in Chicago and grew up in Park Forest, Illinois, where his father worked for the United States Postal Service and Chicago Public Schools. His interest in the history of the railroad system was sparked at a young age but extended throughout his life. He has written several songs discussing both his personal remembrances and history of mid-20th Century railroad lines.

He is vocal about his abstinence from smoking, alcohol, and drugs, and his dislike of rap music—but other parts of his life, especially since his arrival in Hollywood in 1976, are less clear. In interviews he revealed that he served as a cook in the U.S. Navy at one point in his life.
