= Tim & Eric =

American comedy duo

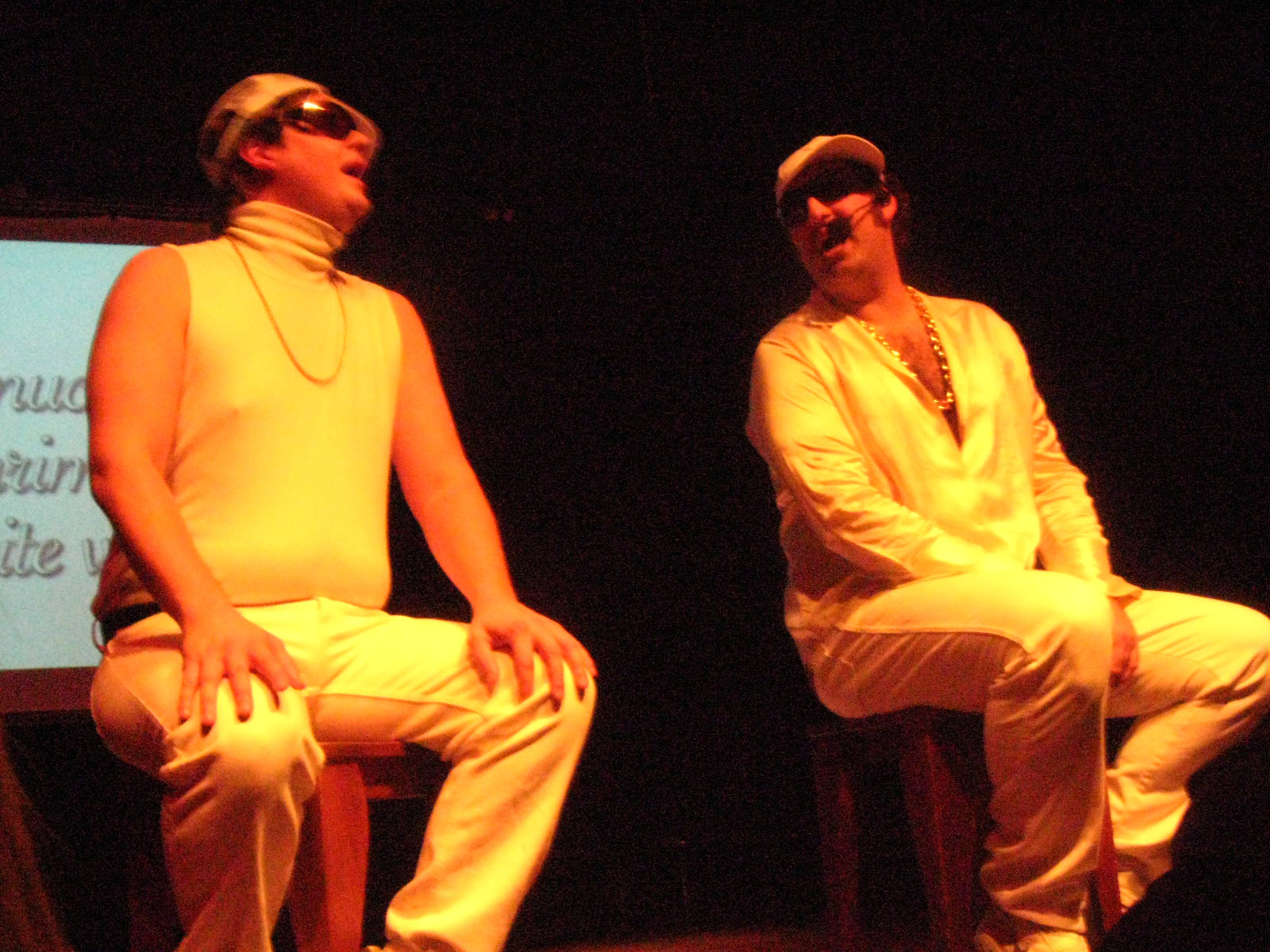
- Tim Heidecker (left) and Eric Wareheim on stage in January 2009

Comedy career
- Years active: 2001–present
- Medium: Television, film, theatre, books, audio
- Genres: Satire; surreal humour; alternative comedy; deadpan humor; shock humor; anti-comedy; cringe comedy; black comedy; surrealism; comedy horror
- Members: Tim Heidecker; Eric Wareheim
- Website: www.timanderic.com

Tim & Eric are an American comedy duo consisting of Tim Heidecker and Eric Wareheim. They are the creators and stars of the Adult Swim television series Tom Goes to the Mayor, Tim and Eric Awesome Show, Great Job!, Check It Out! with Dr. Steve Brule, Tim & Eric's Bedtime Stories, and Beef House.

== Background ==
Both Pennsylvania natives, Heidecker and Wareheim met in 1994 at Temple University in Philadelphia; they became instant friends and collaborators, creating short films and cartoon strips that they put on TimAndEric.com. A short film by the duo called Tom Goes to the Mayor was selected for screenings by the Philadelphia Institute of World Cinema and was included in The University of Pennsylvania's Institute of Contemporary Art.

In 2001, the two compiled a tape of their sketches and mailed it to various comedians they looked up to; one of them, Bob Odenkirk, reacted with enthusiasm and agreed to collaborate with them on a pilot of Tom Goes to the Mayor. The pilot was submitted to Adult Swim, who offered to turn the short into a series which ran on the network for two seasons. Their next project with Adult Swim was the surreal sketch show Tim and Eric Awesome Show, Great Job!, which ran for five seasons and established a cult following for the duo. They released a CD with music from Awesome Show called Tim and Eric Awesome Record, Great Songs! and released a feature film, Tim and Eric's Billion Dollar Movie, in 2012.

The duo's work is known for its distinctively surreal and often grotesque nature, typically featuring what The A.V. Club called "bad fashions, worse hair, intentionally stilted line readings, takes that linger two seconds too long, and an intense attention to the tchotchkes and hobbies everyday people substitute for personalities". Their projects often feature amateur performers and intentionally crude or tacky production values inspired by low-budget advertising, public access television, and video art.

== Projects ==
=== Tom Goes to the Mayor ===
Wareheim and Heidecker became the creators, writers, and stars of Tom Goes to the Mayor, a limited animation series that was on the Adult Swim programming block on Cartoon Network. Wareheim and Heidecker had mailed copies of an early version of the show to comedian Bob Odenkirk, who agreed to take on the project as the executive producer of the series and sold it to Cartoon Network. Wareheim played "The Mayor," an official who always managed to destroy Tom's (Heidecker) well-intentioned plans often along with the entire town as well.

=== Tim and Eric Awesome Show, Great Job! and breakthrough success ===
In 2006, Adult Swim greenlit Tim & Eric Awesome Show, Great Job! and before the end of the year episodes were produced. It was created by and starred Tim Heidecker and Eric Wareheim, and premiered February 11, 2007, on Cartoon Network's Adult Swim comedy block and ran until May 2010. The program features surrealistic and often satirical humor (at points anti-humor), public-access television-style performances, bizarre faux-commercials, and kitsch editing and special effects.

=== Check It Out! with Dr. Steve Brule ===
Check It Out! with Dr. Steve Brule is a spin-off of Tim and Eric Awesome Show, Great Job! starring John C. Reilly as Dr. Steve Brule. Heidecker described the show to Entertainment Weekly as "a show that genuinely feels like this guy made it himself. It's as if it's 4:30 in the morning he had snuck into the studio to make this show without getting permission. It's bare bones. Lots of technical problems. Just a mess. The whole thing is a big mess. A big beautiful mess."

=== Tim and Eric's Billion Dollar Movie ===
Tim and Eric's Billion Dollar Movie (shorthand B$M) is a 2012 comedy film starring, and written and directed by Heidecker and Wareheim. Supporting actors include Zach Galifianakis, Will Ferrell, Jeff Goldblum, John C. Reilly, Erica Durance, and Will Forte, many of whom guest-starred on Awesome Show. It was released in theaters on March 2, 2012, and was released to iTunes and on-demand January 27, 2013.

=== Tim and Eric's Bedtime Stories ===
Adult Swim picked up Tim and Eric's Bedtime Stories after the pilot episode aired as a Halloween special on October 31, 2013, with a seven-episode season debuting on September 18, 2014. The series, which aired an additional two episodes in 2015, is an anthology horror series. The series' second season premiered in 2017.

=== Beef House ===
Beef House premiered on Adult Swim on March 29, 2020.

== Other projects ==
In 2009, Tim and Eric tried to work with Tommy Wiseau in developing his TV pilot The Neighbors for Adult Swim, but later backed out of the project due to creative differences with Wiseau.

In 2011, the duo appeared in The Simpsons episode "The Food Wife", voicing two characters as well as performing a song they wrote.

Tim and Eric, along with LCD Soundsystem frontman James Murphy and comedian Gregg Turkington, starred in the 2012 dramedy The Comedy.

Tim and Eric provided a few faux interview pieces with Maynard James Keenan that were used during Puscifer's 2009–2010 live tour. These vignettes were also included on the DVD/Blu-ray releases of Keenan's 2010 wine-making documentary Blood into Wine.

Tim & Eric collaborated with Michael Cera, Sarah Silverman and Reggie Watts in the creation of the YouTube comedy channel Jash. They released a series of six shorts on the channel, titled Tim & Eric's Go Pro Show, in which they attach cameras to their heads and film a reality show.

Tim and Eric published a book, Tim and Eric's Zone Theory: 7 Easy Steps to Achieve a Perfect Life in July 2015.

In 2026, Tim and Eric provided their own voices for the Robot Chicken television special, "Robot Chicken Adult Swim 25th Anniversary Special".

=== Funny or Die Shorts ===
- Father and Son, S01E04, March 12th, 2010
- Magical Balloon, S01E08, April 16th, 2010
- Just 3 Boyz, S01E10, April 30th, 2010
- Morning Prayer with Skott & Behr, S01E12, May 14th, 2010
- Body Boys: Legend of the Pipers, S02E20, March 4th, 2011
- The Terrys, S02E22, March 18th, 2011

== Abso Lutely Productions ==
Abso Lutely Productions is a film and television production company owned by Heidecker, Wareheim, and producer Dave Kneebone. It produced Tom Goes to the Mayor, Tim and Eric Awesome Show, Great Job! and Check It Out! with Dr. Steve Brule.
