= Check It Out! with Dr. Steve Brule =

Television comedy series

- Genre: Alternative comedy; Surrealism
- Created by: John C. Reilly; Tim & Eric
- Based on: Steve Brule by: Tim Heidecker; Eric Wareheim
- Starring: John C. Reilly
- Opening theme: "Check It Out! with Dr. Steve Brule Theme"
- Ending theme: "New Instructions" by Tobias Becker
- Composer: Tim Heidecker
- Country of origin: United States
- Original language: English
- No. of seasons: 4
- No. of episodes: 24 & 1 special (list of episodes)

Production
- Executive producers: John C. Reilly; Tim Heidecker; Eric Wareheim
- Running time: 11 minutes
- Production companies: Abso Lutely Productions; Williams Street

Original release
- Network: Adult Swim
- Release: May 16, 2010 – July 29, 2016

Related
- Tim and Eric Awesome Show, Great Job!

Check It Out! with Dr. Steve Brule is an American comedy television series starring John C. Reilly as Dr. Steve Brule. The show is a spin-off of Tim and Eric Awesome Show, Great Job!, where Dr. Brule originated. The series premiered on Cartoon Network's late-night programming block, Adult Swim, on May 16, 2010.

The show parodies 1980s public-access television programs and follows Dr. Steve Brule as he examines different facets of living. His extreme and possibly pathological naivete and social awkwardness generally land him in embarrassing situations, though he remains largely ignorant of any embarrassment he causes to himself. As the series progresses, he reveals surprising and sometimes shocking details about his past and personal life. The series has completed four seasons of six episodes each.

In the series, Reilly interviews real people whose reactions, according to executive producer Tim Heidecker, are genuine. Reilly stated that he intends for the humor to derive from Brule's character rather than the reactions of his guests. In post-production, the video is piped through a VCR, which is then intermittently hit to simulate poor production value. The A.V. Club's Brandon Nowalk compared it to The Day Today and Brass Eye, while DVD Verdict's Dawn Hunt compared it to This Is Spinal Tap. The first two seasons were combined onto a single DVD release, made available on October 16, 2012, in Region 1.

== Synopsis ==
The program, a surreal parody of human interest shows, follows Brule as he examines, or "checks out", different facets of living. Throughout the show, Brule frequently behaves embarrassingly and is found in embarrassing situations, though he personally seems impervious to embarrassment. Each episode begins with a poem or lyric pertaining to the subject of the show, followed by Brule crediting the work but usually mispronouncing the author's name; his mispronunciations are a staple of the show—in the first episode, he mispronounced the name of nutritionist Dr. Johnny Bowden both as "Dr. Jimmy Brungus" and "Dr. Jungy Brungan".

As the series progresses, he reveals shocking, sometimes horrifying, details about his past and personal life, such as his mother, Dorris Pringle-Brule-Salahari (Nancy Munoz), having poisoned his food when he was a child in order to "slow him down." The series also features interludes from other public-access hosts; recurring characters include Terry Bruge-Hiplo (Robert Axelrod), Doug Prishpreed (Doug Foster), Carol Krabit (Carol Kraft), and Scott Clam (Scott Stewart). Respectively, they host movie reviews, news updates, fortune-telling & weather updates, and a finance show, all in the same style of low-budget cable access segments.

== Production ==
According to Heidecker, Reilly's dialogue in the show is mostly improvised and the reactions of the guests Reilly interviews as Dr. Steve Brule are genuine. Heidecker stated that the humor revolves around "not necessarily fooling these people" but "more the character of Steve Brule being completely clueless and a really strange guy." He has cited Huell Howser and his show California's Gold as an influence. During an interview for Esquire, Reilly was asked about his experiences on the show; though he did not mind answering the question, he preferred not to elaborate on Brule as a character. He stated that Brule's "persona would be more interesting if left a mystery" and felt the more he elaborated on Brule's character, the less interesting it would become to him.

To achieve the artifact-ridden quality of the video, the editors pipe the footage through a videocassette recorder and the post-production crew literally hits the recorder in order to simulate a jump in the vertical synchronization. In an interview with Entertainment Weekly, Heidecker elaborated on the aesthetic quality of the series: "It's a show that genuinely feels like this guy made it himself. It’s as if it's 4:30 in the morning he had snuck into the studio to make this show without getting permission. It's bare-bones. Lots of technical problems. Just a mess. The whole thing is a big mess. A big beautiful mess."

== Episodes ==
The series has completed four seasons with six episodes each. The first season premiered on May 16, 2010, in the United States and concluded on June 20, 2010. The second season premiered on March 18, 2012, in the United States and concluded on April 22, 2012. The third season premiered on February 27, 2014, and concluded on April 4, 2014. Adult Swim, in an announcement made before its upfront presentation, revealed Check It Out! with Dr. Steve Brule to be a returning show for its 2015-16 schedule in May 2016. The fourth season premiered June 18, 2016. and concluded on July 29, 2016.

A 30-minute special entitled Bagboy aired on February 20, 2015. A special episode depicting recurring character Scott Clam hosting in place of Brule (as a result of the events of the season 4 finale), aired on October 23, 2017.

On January 1, 2021, Tim and Eric hosted a watch-along of their Billion Dollar Movie. As part of it, they teased a potential future project involving Brule.

== International broadcast ==
In Canada, Check It Out! with Dr. Steve Brule previously aired on G4's Adult Digital Distraction block, and currently airs on the Canadian version of Adult Swim.

== Critical reception ==
The series has garnered positive critical reception; Ross Luippold of The Huffington Post gave the series a positive review, noting Reilly's performance and stating he "may be the only actor alive who can get away with starring in critically acclaimed films during Oscar season… while concurrently starring in two Tim & Eric joints." Lindsay Hurd of The Michigan Daily highlighted the stage design in her review, stating that "The show's set is just as amusing as Brule's lack of coherence… [the series] amounts to a gaudy-but-comical set that oddly matches Brule's reporting style." Casey Burchby of DVD Talk "highly recommended" the series' first and second DVD release. He praised the eponymous character, stating "John C. Reilly's Dr. Steve Brule is one of the most likable characters in recent TV history." While he praised the series as "a rare example of a well-developed and justified spinoff", he found the series best enjoyed "parceled out one at a time".

Check It Out! With Dr. Steve Brule isn't just a public-access parody or a character study. It's an exciting, inventive experiment, surfing highs and lows together, a thoroughly modern pastiche of analog nostalgia, train-wreck television, awkward comedy, surrealist flights, and unsettling tactics.

— Nowalk on the second season finale "Life"

The series has received positive critical reception from The A.V. Club; the site has graded the first season three As, two Bs and one C grade. Writing for the site, Brandon Nowalk felt the interviews for the second-season finale "Life" accentuates "a different facet" of the series' humor: "1990s absurdism." He cited The Day Today and Brass Eye as two examples of this quality, while stating Brule's character is closer to Harry S. Plinkett than of Stephen Colbert or Sacha Baron Cohen. He later regarded its third season as "a little lighter on the laughs than usual", but found it "slightly better produced", with the audience "growing accustomed to the usual blunders."

In reviewing the first and second season D.V.D. release, Luke Bonanno of DVDizzy praised Reilly's character; however, he was critical of reprising the "bold characters" of Wayne and Jan Skylar from Awesome Show, stating that "such [characters] just aren't a good fit here and weigh down on the humor." He panned the network's lack of promotion for the series and wished for more episodes per season "even if making it with Tim and Eric had to be a creatively-liberating blast".

Dusty Somers of Blogcritics stated the portrayal of Dr. Brule "adds unexpected dimensions of naked vulnerability and a childlike fear of a world he doesn't understand." Dawn Hunt of DVD Verdict gave the series 95 out of 100; he applauded the series as an "homage to the local cable access shows of the 1980s." He compared the series to mockumentaries such as This Is Spinal Tap and stated that the visual look of the series "looks, feels, and sounds like it came straight from the MTV Generation."

== Home media ==
The combined first two seasons were released on DVD on October 16, 2012, in Region 1. Entitled Check It Out! with Dr. Steve Brule: Season 1 & 2, the DVD features episodes in production order.

== See also ==
- Look Around You, Second Series: A British alternative-comedy television show which similarly parodies 1970s/1980s contemporary science, technology, and human-interest TV programs, such as Tomorrow's World.
