= Dave Kneebone =

American producer

- Occupation: Producer
- Spouse: Casimira Buryn (m. 2007)
- Website: absolutelyproductions.com

Dave Kneebone is an American television producer. Along with Eric Wareheim and Tim Heidecker, he founded and runs Abso Lutely Productions, which produces a variety of comedic television shows and films. His role has been described as the business chief and "straight man" at Abso Lutely. Kneebone has worked as a producer on a variety of television shows, including Comedy Bang! Bang!, Nathan for You, and Tim and Eric Awesome Show, Great Job!. He is also listed as a producer on the feature film Tim and Eric's Billion Dollar Movie.
