= Eric Wareheim =

American comedian, musician, actor and director (born 1976)

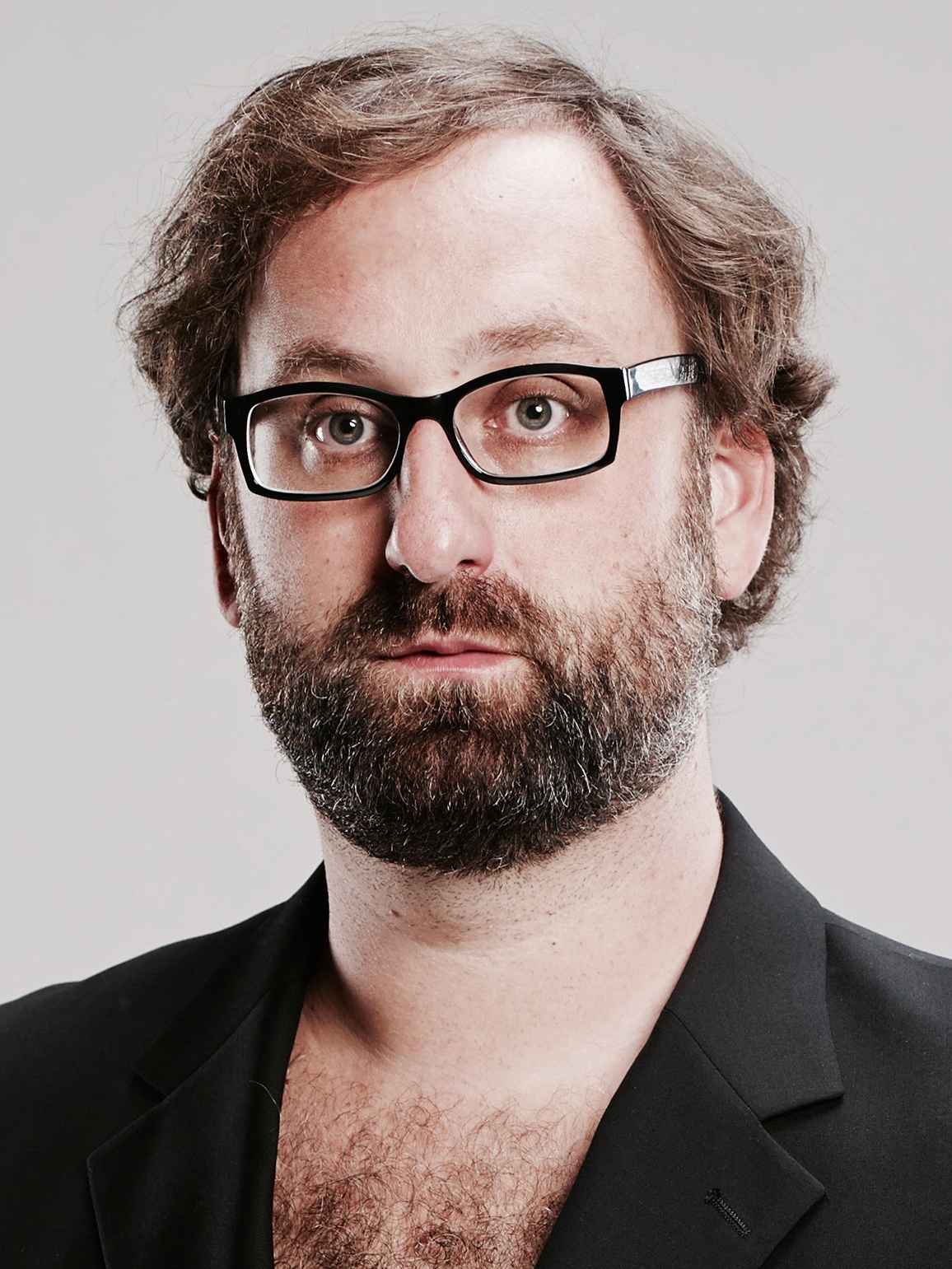
- Wareheim in 2022
- Born: April 7, 1976 (age 50); Baltimore, Maryland, U.S.
- Occupations: Comedian; actor; writer; director; musician
- Years active: 1993–present
- Website: timanderic.com

Eric Alexander Wareheim (/ˈwɛərhaɪm/; born April 7, 1976) is an American comedian, actor, writer, director, and musician. He is best known as one-half of the comedy duo Tim & Eric, alongside Tim Heidecker. He also had a recurring role on the Netflix series Master of None.

== Early life and education ==
Wareheim was born in Baltimore, Maryland, on April 7, 1976, the son of Dave and Edeltraud Wareheim. He has a sister, Jessica. When he was young, his family moved to Audubon, Pennsylvania, where he grew up. His maternal grandparents lived in Germany, and his family would travel to Germany often to visit them. He graduated from Methacton High School in Norristown, Pennsylvania.

He later attended Temple University, where he met his comedy partner Tim Heidecker and produced his first film, shot on the Jersey Shore.

== Career ==
=== Tim & Eric ===
Wareheim and Heidecker are the creators, writers, and stars of Tom Goes to the Mayor, a limited animation that was on the Adult Swim programming block on Cartoon Network. Wareheim and Heidecker had mailed copies of an early version of the show to comedian Bob Odenkirk, who agreed to take on the project as the executive producer of the series and sold it to Cartoon Network.

The Tim and Eric names reached a broader audience with the release of Tim and Eric Awesome Show, Great Job!, which premiered on February 11, 2007. The show is a mix of "live action, sketch, animation, emotions, phone calls, love, etc." according to their website. The creators have described the show as the "nightmare version of television".

In July 2008, The New York Times reported that the duo was in the process of developing a surreal game show series starring Neil Hamburger, titled The New Big Ball with Neil Hamburger. Wareheim described it as a mix between "Japanese bizarre game show and The Price Is Right." In late July 2009, Neil Hamburger posted a blog on MySpace stating that a pilot had been filmed, but that Adult Swim was not satisfied and had "pulled the plug on the project."

On May 2, 2010, the "Man Milk" episode of Tim and Eric Awesome Show, Great Job! wrapped season five of the show. Though this would be the last serial content for the show, an hour-long holiday program titled "Chrimbus Special" gave fans a last glimpse at the TV program. It was the second show Wareheim both produced and starred in, which aired during Cartoon Network's Adult Swim block.

Between May and June 2010, six episodes of an Awesome Show spin-off produced in part by Wareheim, Check It Out! with Dr. Steve Brule, were aired on Cartoon Network. The show parodied local newscasts. According to Heidecker, John C. Reilly had the original idea of giving the Dr. Steve character an entire show.

Wareheim also co-directed, wrote and starred in Tim and Eric's Billion Dollar Movie with Tim Heidecker.

=== Music ===
Wareheim played in several Philadelphia area bands, including the new wave punk band Twelve Tone System, of which Tim Heidecker was also briefly a member. Wareheim briefly played rhythm guitar for the duo Adam and Justine in the 1990s. Wareheim was also the principal songwriter for The Science Of and had been a member of Elements of Need, I Am Heaven, and briefly with the punk band Ink & Dagger. He currently is involved with the band Sola.

=== Television ===
Wareheim made an appearance in Aqua Teen Hunger Force as the Germ-Master, along with Heidecker as a basketball.

Wareheim, along with Tim Heidecker, also directed the 2010 Super Bowl commercial, The Shuffle, for Boost Mobile and most recently a series of Old Spice commercials with actor Terry Crews.

They also made an appearance in an episode of The Simpsons as Amus Bruse and Fois Garth.

Wareheim and Heidecker appeared together as Debt Collectors on the Adult Swim special, The Young Persons Guide to History, and have made guest appearances in the movie Let's Go to Prison, as well as the Scottish video game series VideoGaiden and a Version 2 episode of Mega64. Wareheim also played a recurring role in Michael Cera's and Clark Duke's Internet TV show Clark and Michael as Randy, the neighbor of the titular duo.

Using characters and skits from Awesome Show, Heidecker and Wareheim (via their Abso Lutely Productions company) created an online-only show called Tim and Eric Nite Live!, originally broadcast on the website SuperDeluxe.

In 2015, Wareheim co-starred as Arnold Baumheiser in the Netflix comedy series Master of None. He appeared in six episodes and directed four episodes of the first season. In 2017, he appeared in seven episodes and directed one episode of the show's second season.

In 2019, Wareheim starred as a man claiming to be "reality" in a series of Oculus Quest commercials.

=== Other activities ===
In 2021, Wareheim ventured into the world of cooking, a longtime hobby of his, with his cookbook Foodheim: A Culinary Adventure. Part of his promotion for the book is a webseries called Heimy's House where he prepares recipes from the book. The first (and currently only) episode of the series featured a guest appearance by Tim Heidecker.

== Filmography ==
=== Film ===
Key
| † | Denotes films that have not yet been released |

| Year | Title | Role | Notes |
|---|---|---|---|
| 2002 | Tom Goes to the Mayor | The Mayor (voice) | Short film; also co-writer, co-director, and producer with Tim Heidecker |
| 2003 | Tom Goes to the Mayor Returns | The Mayor (voice) | Short film; also co-writer, co-director, and producer with Tim Heidecker |
| 2006 | Let's Go to Prison | Wine Taster | Uncredited |
| 2008 | Adventures of Power | Money | |
| 2009 | Al's Brain | Brain stretcher | Short film |
| 2010 | Blood into Wine | Himself | Documentary |
| 2012 | The Comedy | Van Arman | |
| 2012 | Tim and Eric's Billion Dollar Movie | Eric | Also co-writer, co-director, and producer; feature directorial debut |
| 2013 | Arcade Fire in Here Comes The Night Time | Big Bud | NBC Special |
| 2013 | Wrong Cops | Officer de Luca | |
| 2013 | Hamper's Pre-Natal Life Coaching | | Co-writer and co-director with Tim Heidecker |
| 2014 | Food Club | Captain Wareheim | Short film; also director, co-writer, and executive producer |
| 2014 | Reality | Henri | |
| 2019 | Mister America | | Co-producer with Tim Heidecker & Gregg Turkington |
| 2026 | Full Phil | Andy | |
| 2026 | Onslaught | Kovacks | |

=== Television ===
| Year | Title | Role | Notes |
|---|---|---|---|
| 2004 | Aqua Teen Hunger Force | Germ Master (voice) | Episode: "Hypno-Germ" |
| 2004–06 | Tom Goes to the Mayor | The Mayor / Various (voices) | 30 episodes; also co-writer, co-director, and executive producer |
| 2007–10 | Tim and Eric Awesome Show, Great Job! | Eric / Various | Also co-creator, co-writer, co-director, and executive producer |
| 2008 | Young Person's Guide to History | Bill Collector 2 #1 | Episode: "#1.2" |
| 2008 | Steve and Stephen | | Creator, writer, and director |
| 2009 | Talkshow with Spike Feresten | Derrick Whipple | Episode: "Jim Heckler and Derrick Whipple" |
| 2010 | Morning Prayer with Skott and Behr | Behr | Also writer and director |
| 2010 | The New Big Ball With Neil Hamburger | | Unaired pilot; co-writer, co-director, and producer |
| 2010–11 | Funny or Die Presents | Various | 6 episodes; also segment director and executive producer |
| 2010–2016 | Check It Out! with Dr. Steve Brule | Wayne Skylar | Also co-creator, co-writer, co-director, and executive producer |
| 2011 | Bob's Burgers | Phil Finnegan (voice) | Episode: "Torpedo" |
| 2011 | Jon Benjamin Has a Van | Jargon Loprax (voice) | Episode: "Stardoor" |
| 2011 | The Simpsons | Fois Garth (voice) | Episode: "The Food Wife" |
| 2013 | The Office | Gabor | 4 episodes |
| 2013–2017 | Nathan for You | | Executive producer |
| 2013–17 | Tim and Eric's Bedtime Stories | Eric / Various | Also co-creator, co-writer, co-director, and executive producer |
| 2014 | Community | Male Four #2 | Episode: "App Development and Condiments" |
| 2014 | The Birthday Boys | Mill Owner | Episode: "Plight of the Working Class" |
| 2014 | Rubberhead | | Segment: "Ham"; director |
| 2014–2017 | Review | | Executive producer |
| 2015 | Bagboy | | Television special; co-creator, co-writer, co-director, and executive producer |
| 2015–2017 | Master of None | Arnold | 2 seasons |
| 2015 | Hot Package | | 5 episodes; executive producer |
| 2015 | W/ Bob & David | | Executive producer |
| 2016 | Decker | | Executive producer |
| 2018 | Ugly Delicious | Himself | Episode: "Fried Chicken" |
| 2019-2021 | Crank Yankers | Mork | 2 episodes |
| 2020 | Beef House | Eric | Also co-creator and executive producer |
| 2021 | The LCD Soundsystem Holiday Special | James Murphy | Also director |
| 2024 | Game Changer | Steven / "The Ratfish" / Himself | 2 Episodes |
| 2024 | Dinner Time Live with David Chang | Himself | Episode: "Oktoberfest" |
| 2026 | Robot Chicken | Eric Wareheim (voice) | Television special: "The Robot Chicken Adult Swim Special" |

=== Web series ===
| Year | Title | Role | Notes |
|---|---|---|---|
| 2006 | Tim and Eric: The Podcast | Various | Also co-writer, co-director, and producer |
| 2006 | Mega64 | Mega64 Ragtime Jug Brother | Episode: "Stranger" |
| 2007 | Clark and Michael | Randy | |
| 2007-2008 | Tim and Eric Nite Live! | Eric Wareheim | Also co-creator and co-writer |
| 2013 | Dr. Wareheim | Dr. Wareheim | Also co-creator, co-writer, and co-director |
| 2013 | Tim's Kitchen Tips | Eric Wareheim | Also co-creator, co-writer, and co-director |
| 2013 | Tim & Eric's Go Pro Show | Eric Wareheim | Also co-creator |

=== Music videos ===
- "Polite Dance Song" – The Bird and the Bee (2007)
- "You Don't Know Me" – Ben Folds (feat. Regina Spektor) (co-directed by Tim Heidecker) (2008)
- "Dance Floor Dale" – a music video for the song "Parisian Goldfish" by Flying Lotus (2008)
- "Parisian Goldfish" – Flying Lotus (2008) (co-directed with Eric Fensler)
- "The Youth" – MGMT (2008)
- "If I Never See Your Face Again (Swizz Beatz Remix)" – Maroon 5 (2008)
- "Dropped" – Phantom Planet (2009)
- "She's Got Me Dancing" – Tommy Sparks (2009)
- "Keep it Goin' Louder" – Major Lazer (2009)
- "Pon De Floor" – Major Lazer (2009)
- "Buffalo Stance" – Need New Body
- "Hole to Feed" – Depeche Mode (2009)
- “Tall Boy” – Har Mar Superstar (2009) (cameo; directed by Tomorrow’s Brightest Minds)
- "We Are Water" – Health (2010)
- "Wishes" – Beach House (2013)
- "Backpacker Bush" – Dutch Boys featuring Twankstar (2013)
- "Bubble Butt" – Major Lazer (2013)
- "Die" – Babes (2014)
- "Streaker" – Tobacco (2014)
- "HAM" – Mr. Oizo (2014)
- "Famous" – Charli XCX (2015)
- "Dripping" – Blonde Redhead (2016)
- "5 Ways" – Shakewell (2021) (cameo; directed by Dan Streit)

== Discography ==
- (2008) Awesome Record, Great Songs! (by Tim and Eric)

== Awards ==
- Webby Award for best actor as part of the comedy team of Tim and Eric
- Directors Guild of America Awards nomination for "Outstanding Directorial Achievement in Commercials" for CeraVe's "Michael CeraVe" (shared with Tim Heidecker)
