= List of people from Nashville, Tennessee =

The following is a list of notable people who have lived in Nashville, Tennessee.

== Native Nashvillians ==
People born in Tennessee:

Name	Birth year	Notability	Reference
John Adams	1825	Brigadier general during the American Civil War	
Shak Adams	1998	Soccer player	
Duane Allman	1946	Guitarist and founding member of the Allman Brothers Band	
Gregg Allman	1947	Singer, keyboardist and founding member of the Allman Brothers Band	
Frank Maxwell Andrews	1884	Important figure in U.S. military aviation	
Casey Atwood	1980	NASCAR driver	
Alfred Bartles	1930	Composer of jazz/classical crossover music	
Bill Belichick	1952	Former head coach of six-time Super Bowl champion New England Patriots	
Madison Smartt Bell	1957	Novelist	
Julian Bond	1940	Civil rights activist	
Robert Earl Bonney	1882	U.S. Navy Medal of Honor recipient, 1910	
Linn Boyd	1800	Member of Congress from Kentucky and speaker of the United States House of Representatives	
Beverly Briley	1914	Mayor of Nashville, 1963–1975	
David Briley	1964	Mayor of Nashville, 2018	
Marvelyn Brown	1984	HIV/AIDS activist	
Thomas Bunday	1948	Serial killer who murdered six women in Fairbanks, Alaska	
Kitty Cheatham	1864	Singer and actress	
Sara Ward Conley	1859	Artist	
James Craig	1912	Actor	
Anne Dallas Dudley	1876	Women's suffrage activist	
Thomas Fletcher	1817	Arkansas politician	
Colin Ford	1996	Actor	
Morris Frank	1908	Founder, the Seeing Eye, first guide dog training school	
Bill Frist	1952	Former U.S. Senate majority leader	
John Gordy	1935	Tennessee Volunteers and Detroit Lions football player	
Dick Griffey	1938	Record executive and promoter	
Red Grooms	1937	Artist	
Noodles Hahn	1879	Major League Baseball player	
Bobby Hamilton	1957	NASCAR driver	
Demonte Harper	1989	American basketball player in the Israeli Basketball Premier League	
Bobby Hebb	1938	R&B/soul songwriter, singer, musician known for the hit "Sunny"	
Les Hunter	1942	Center of 1963 Loyola Ramblers basketball national championship team	
Thomas Setzer Hutchison	1875	Military officer, police commissioner, civil reformer, author, inventor	
Lillian Jackson	1919	All-American Girls Professional Baseball League founding member	
Marion James	1934	Blues singer	
Claude Jarman Jr.	1934	Actor	
Randall Jarrell	1914	Poet and writer	
Jeff Jarrett	1967	Professional wrestler	
Claude Jonnard	1897	Professional baseball player for the New York Giants	
Caleb Joseph	1986	Major League Baseball player	
Lucille La Verne	1872	Actress	
Margaret Landis	1890	Silent screen actress	
Mary Louise Lester	1921	All-American Girls Professional Baseball League founding member	
Kathy Liebert	1967	World Series of Poker bracelet winner	
Beth Littleford	1968	Comedian and actress	
Ellen McLain	1952	Voice actress	
Ron Mercer	1976	Professional basketball player	
Tom Moran	1899	Football player	
William Morrison	1860	Dentist, inventor of cotton candy	
Alice Oates	1849	Actress and pioneer of musical theatre	
Chord Overstreet	1989	Singer, songwriter, TV actor	
Bettie Page	1923	Pin-up model	
Keith Paskett	1964	Professional football player for Green Bay Packers	
James B. Pearson	1920	U.S. Senator	
Antoinette Van Leer Polk	1847	French baroness	
Annie Potts	1952	Actress	(Note: Some sources list Potts' birthplace as Franklin, Kentucky, rather than Nashville.)
Shelton Quarles	1971	Professional football player for Tampa Bay Buccaneers	
Emily J. Reynolds	1956	Former Secretary of the U.S. Senate	
Robert Ryman	1930	Visual artist	
Hillary Scott	1986	Singer-songwriter, member of country music trio Lady Antebellum	
John Seigenthaler	1927	Journalist, writer, and political figure	
Jackie Shane	1940	Soul and rhythm and blues singer; among first black transgender musicians to chart	
Nate Simpson	1954	Football player	
Ahmaad Smith	1983	Football player	
Edwin Starr	1942	Motown soul and R&B singer/songwriter	
Turkey Stearnes	1901	Baseball player	
Samuel Stritch	1887	First American member of the Roman Curia	
Phillip Supernaw	1990	NFL player	
Andrea True	1943	Pornstar and disco singer	
Anthony Van Leer	1783	Prominent iron works owner in Tennessee	
Carlos Clark Van Leer	1865	United States Army officer and chief of personnel at Department of the Treasury	
Eric Volz	1979	Magazine publisher wrongfully convicted of murder in Nicaragua	
Lark Voorhies	1974	Television actress	
Charlie Wade	1950	Football player	
Chuck Wagner	1958	Actor	
William Walker	1824	Journalist, adventurer, and briefly the President of Nicaragua	
Gretchen Walsh	2003	Swimmer	
Kitty Wells	1919	Musician and singer, commonly referred to as the Queen of Country Music	
Hank Williams III	1972	Singer and musician	
Walter K. Wilson Sr.	1880	US Army major general	
Del Wood	1920	Ragtime, gospel, and country music pianist	
Young Buck	1981	Rapper	

== Musicians and songwriters ==
With its status as a major hub of music production (especially country and gospel music), Nashville attracts a wide array of musicians, singers, and songwriters.

- Roy Acuff – country singer-songwriter; co-founder (with Fred Rose) of the Acuff-Rose publishing house
- Dean Alexander – country singer-songwriter
- Chet Atkins – country guitarist and record producer
- The Band Perry – country pop band
- Dave Barnes – acoustic singer-songwriter
- Greg Bates – country singer-songwriter
- David Berman – singer-songwriter of Silver Jews
- Beeb Birtles – former member of Little River Band
- Pat Boone (Charles Eugene Boone) – pop singer and actor
- Jordana Bryant – country/pop singer-songwriter, originally from Pennsylvania
- Bully – rock band
- J. J. Cale – songwriter and musician, known for writing "After Midnight" and "Cocaine"
- Glen Campbell – pop and country musician, TV personality and actor, sang "Rhinestone Cowboy" and "By the Time I Get to Phoenix"
- Johnny Cash – country singer-songwriter and actor, known to his fans as "The Man in Black"
- June Carter Cash – country singer-songwriter, wife of Johnny Cash, and member of the A.P. Carter family
- Desmond Child – hit rock/pop songwriter for Cher, Kiss, Aerosmith, Ricky Martin, Bonnie Tyler, Bon Jovi, and others
- Cimorelli – YouTube girl group, originally from El Dorado Hills, California
- The Civil Wars – folk/Americana duo
- Kelly Clarkson – pop singer-songwriter, first winner of American Idol
- Patsy Cline – country singer-songwriter, first woman in Country Music Hall of Fame
- Kyle Cook – singer-songwriter of Matchbox Twenty
- Rita Coolidge – pop recording artist and songwriter
- Billy Cox – bassist, last surviving member of the Jimi Hendrix Experience
- Sheryl Crow – singer-songwriter, actress
- Billy Ray Cyrus – country singer-songwriter, and actor; father of Miley Cyrus and Noah Cyrus
- Miley Cyrus – country/pop singer-songwriter, star of Hannah Montana; daughter of Billy Ray Cyrus and older sister of Noah Cyrus
- Noah Cyrus – singer-songwriter, and actress; daughter of Billy Ray Cyrus and younger sister of Miley Cyrus
- Steve Earle – country singer-songwriter
- Tommy Emmanuel – guitarist, native to Australia but lives in Nashville
- The Everly Brothers – pop music duo
- Zac Farro – drummer
- Fisk Jubilee Singers – gospel choir
- Lester Flatt – bluegrass pioneer
- Béla Fleck – banjoist, lived in Nashville most of his young adulthood, originally from New York City
- Dan Fogelberg – singer-songwriter of diverse musical styles, top-selling musician of 1970s–80s
- Ben Folds – singer-songwriter, former frontman of Ben Folds Five
- Framing Hanley – alternative rock band
- Peter Frampton – English rock musician, producer, songwriter, lives in Nashville
- Russ Freeman – lead of award-winning jazz band, The Rippingtons
- Kathy Lee Gifford – television host, singer-songwriter, actress, and author
- Josh Gracin – country singer
- Amy Grant – singer-songwriter known for Christian themes
- Emmylou Harris – country singer-songwriter, and musician
- Kerry Harvick – country singer-songwriter, cast member of the hit reality series Bad Girls Club
- Brandon Heath – Christian singer-songwriter
- Bobby Hebb – R&B/soul songwriter, musician, singer known for the song "Sunny"
- John Hiatt – songwriter and musician
- Faith Hill – country music singer
- Robyn Hitchcock – English alternative-rock musician
- Hot Chelle Rae – popular rock pop band
- Harlan Howard – Music Row songwriter
- David Hungate – bassist for Toto, also recorded with several country artists
- Alan Jackson – country singer-songwriter
- Jelly Roll – musician, songwriter, lyricist
- Struggle Jennings – musician, songwriter, lyricist
- Waylon Jennings – country singer-guitarist
- Naomi Judd – mother-daughter (with Wynonna Judd) country music singer-songwriter
- Wynonna Judd – mother-daughter (with Naomi Judd) country music singer-songwriter
- Jet Jurgensmeyer – teen actor and musician
- Donny Kees – musician and songwriter
- Tay Keith - Rap music artist and record producer
- Kesha – pop singer
- Kings of Leon – rock musicians
- Robert Knight – R&B singer best known for the hit "Everlasting Love"
- Kris Kristofferson – country singer-songwriter and actor
- Lady Antebellum – country music trio group
- Brenda Lee – pop singer, Rock and Roll Hall of Fame and Grammy Lifetime Achievement Award
- Little Big Town – country music group
- Little Richard – rock musician
- Kimberley Locke – pop and R&B singer
- Liam Lynch – musician and co-creator of the television show Sifl and Olly
- Loretta Lynn – country singer-songwriter
- Mandisa – Christian music artist
- Barbara Mandrell – country singer-songwriter
- Chris Marion – member of classic rock's Little River Band
- Martina McBride – singer-songwriter
- Tim McGraw – country music singer-songwriter and actor
- Reba McEntire – country music singer and actress
- Roger Miller – country singer-songwriter, known for "King of the Road"
- Neal Morse – singer-songwriter, multi-instrumentalist, bandleader and progressive rock composer based in Nashville
- Dave Mustaine – lead musician for heavy metal band Megadeth
- Willie Nelson – guitarist and country singer, member of the outlaw country movement
- Aaron Neville – soul singer and member of the Neville Brothers; displaced from his native New Orleans by Hurricane Katrina
- The New Schematics – indie rock band
- John Oates – hit rock and soul recording artist from duo Hall & Oates, has homes in Colorado and Nashville
- St. Louis Jimmy Oden – blues pianist, born here in 1903
- Roy Orbison – singer-songwriter, Rock and Roll Hall of Fame, known for "Pretty Woman"
- Brad Paisley – country singer-songwriter
- Paramore – rock musicians
- Dolly Parton – country singer-songwriter and actress
- Johnny Paycheck – country singer
- Wayne Perry – country singer-songwriter and producer
- Kellie Pickler – country music singer-songwriter
- Poppy – pop singer-songwriter
- Millard Powers – member of Counting Crows, musician, songwriter, producer, engineer
- Rascal Flatts – country music trio
- Caroline Keating Reed – pianist and music teacher
- Tex Ritter – singing cowboy
- Earl Scruggs – bluegrass banjo player
- Ed Sheeran – English singer, songwriter, producer, actor
- Blake Shelton – country singer, judge on TV series The Voice
- Michael W. Smith – Christian music artist
- Soccer Mommy – indie rock back fronted by Sophie Allison
- Chris Stapleton – country/bluegrass/rock musician
- Starlito – rapper
- Edwin Starr – 1970s funk singer
- Marty Stuart – country/bluegrass musician; host of his own show on RFD-TV
- Donna Summer – disco and R&B singer
- Emma Swift – Australian country/Americana musician
- Taylor Swift – one of the world's top-selling singer-songwriters
- Thompson Square – country music duo
- Ernest Tubb – singer-songwriter, one of the pioneers of country music
- Shania Twain – Canadian country music singer-songwriter and actress
- Steven Tyler – lead singer-songwriter of rock band Aerosmith
- Upchurch – rapper, singer-songwriter, and comedian
- Keith Urban – country music superstar, married to Nicole Kidman
- Townes Van Zandt – folk music singer-songwriter
- Gillian Welch – contemporary "alt-country" songwriter and singer
- Kitty Wells – singer and musician from country music's early days
- Matt Wertz – acoustic singer-songwriter
- Dottie West – country singer-songwriter
- Jack White – guitarist and lead vocalist of The White Stripes
- Hayley Williams – musician, songwriter, lyricist
- Allen Woody – bassist for the Allman Brothers Band and Gov't Mule
- Victor Wooten – virtuoso electric bass guitar player
- Emily Wright – songwriter, producer and engineer
- Tammy Wynette – country singer-songwriter, known for "Stand By Your Man"
- Dwight Yoakam – country musician, songwriter and actor
- Taylor York – musician, songwriter, lyricist
- Young Buck – rapper and member of G-Unit

== Political figures ==
Al Gore

=== National ===
- Edward Carmack – former U.S. senator, newspaper editor, and attorney
- Bill Frist – former U.S. Senate majority leader
- Lance Gooden – U.S. representative for Texas
- Al Gore Jr. – former U.S. vice president and senator; recipient of the Nobel Peace Prize
- Tipper Gore – Second Lady of the United States 1993–2001
- Bill Hagerty – U.S. senator; former U.S. ambassador to Japan
- Sam Houston – U.S. congressman, governor of both Tennessee and Texas, and president of the Republic of Texas; namesake of the city of Houston
- Andrew Jackson – former U.S. president
- Andrew Johnson – former U.S. president and vice president
- John Lewis – civil rights leader, U.S. congressman (GA 5th Dist.), and former SNCC chairman
- Andy Ogles – U.S. representative for Tennessee
- James K. Polk – former U.S. president
- James T. Rapier – former U.S. congressman for the 2nd District of Alabama and 19th-century African-American activist
- Fred Thompson – former U.S. senator and actor
- Matt Van Epps – U.S. representative for Tennessee

=== Local ===
- Megan Barry – first female mayor of Nashville; first female mayor of Nashville to resign office
- Phil Bredesen – mayor of Nashville 1991–99, governor of Tennessee 2003–2011
- John Ray Clemmons (born 1977) – member of the Tennessee House of Representatives, representing the 55th district, in West Nashville
- Karl Dean – former mayor of Nashville
- John Jay Hooker – attorney, perennial candidate, and political gadfly

== Other Nashvillians ==
=== Artists and writers ===
- Emelie C. S. Chilton – writer, editor
- Greg Downs – Flannery O'Connor Award-winning short story writer
- Tony Earley – novelist and short story writer
- Karen Kingsbury – novelist
- Harmony Korine – filmmaker and artist
- Rachel Korine – actress and photographer, married to Harmony Korine
- Alan LeQuire – sculptor
- Jon Meacham – Pulitzer-prize winning writer, reviewer, historian and presidential biographer
- Ann Patchett – novelist
- T. M. Schleier – early photographer
- Robert Penn Warren – Pulitzer Prize-winning novelist and poet
- Tennessee Williams – foremost playwright of 20th-century drama, lived briefly in Nashville

=== Business leaders ===
- A. M. Burton – founder of Life and Casualty Insurance Company and philanthropist
- Mike Curb – founder of Curb Records, former Lieutenant Governor of California
- George A. Dickel – liquor distributor
- Dick Griffey – record producer, music promoter
- Wallace Rasmussen – businessman, philanthropist, CEO of Beatrice Foods
- Preston Taylor – minister, businessperson, philanthropist

=== Civic leaders ===
- William N. Bilbo – attorney, lobbyist for passage of the 13th Amendment, ending slavery
- William Driver – nicknamed the U.S. flag "Old Glory"
- Francis Guess – Nashville businessman and member of the United States Commission on Civil Rights (1983–1989)
- James Lawson – civil rights leader and Methodist minister
- John Lewis – civil rights leader and congressman from Georgia's 5th Congressional District
- Z. Alexander Looby – lawyer active in the American Civil Rights Movement
- Dan May – civic leader
- Diane Nash – civil rights leader
- Azariah Southworth – former host of a Christian television show; LGBT rights advocate

=== Entertainers ===
- Nate Bargatze – comedian
- Kirk Cameron - actor
- Kristin Chenoweth – Tony Award-winning Broadway actress
- Rachel DiPillo – actress, currently stars in NBC's Chicago Med
- Doug the Pug – famous dog
- Natalia Dyer – actress
- Ralph Emery – country music disc jockey and television host
- Ben Foster - actor
- Eddie Frierson – voice actor, playwright
- Kathie Lee Gifford – television personality and former star of NBC's Today show
- Chet Hanks - actor, Tom Hank’s son
- Phil Harris – comedian, actor, singer, and jazz musician
- Melissa Joan Hart – actress
- Patricia Heaton – actress
- Dwayne Johnson – actor, professional wrestler, alumni of both Glencliff High School and McGavock High School
- Ashley Judd – actress and political activist
- Demetria Kalodimos – Emmy Award-winning anchor for WSMV-TV
- Nicole Kidman – actress
- Sondra Locke (1944–2018) – Oscar-nominated actress from Shelbyville, Tennessee lived in Nashville most of her young adulthood
- Laura Osnes - Tony Award-nominated Broadway actress
- Minnie Pearl (Sarah Cannon) – country comedian who appeared frequently on the Grand Ole Opry
- Jason Priestley – actor who starred on the television series Beverly Hills, 90210
- Dennis Quaid - actor
- Henry Rollins- musician, actor, poet
- Dinah Shore – singer, actress, and television personality
- Jessica Simpson - actress and singer
- Richard Speight Jr. – actor
- Mary Steenburgen – actress, songwriter wife of Ted Danson
- Frank Sutton – actor, played Sergeant Carter on the hit TV series Gomer Pyle
- Lee Summers – actor and theatre producer
- Austin Swift – actor, brother of Taylor Swift
- Niki Taylor – supermodel and TV presenter
- Adair Tishler – actress
- Jim Varney – actor, known for his character Ernest P. Worrell
- Dawn Wells – actress, Gilligan's Island
- WhistlinDiesel – YouTuber
- William Wilkerson – founder of Flamingo Las Vegas hotel, Ciro's nightclub
- Oprah Winfrey – talk show host, movie producer, and entrepreneur
- Reese Witherspoon – Academy Award-winning actress
- Evan Rachel Wood – actress, musician, and star of TV series Westworld

=== Journalists and talk show hosts ===
- Tomi Lahren – political commentator for Fox News
- Jon Meacham – Pulitzer Prize-winning author; former Newsweek editor
- Dave Ramsey – talk radio host and author
- Grantland Rice – sportswriter
- Fred Russell – sportswriter
- Pat Sajak – DJ, TV weather reporter, and former host of game show Wheel of Fortune
- John Seigenthaler Jr. – MSNBC news anchor; son of John Seigenthaler Sr.

=== Religious leaders ===
- Richard Henry Boyd – founder and head of the National Baptist Publishing Board
- Virginia E. Walker Broughton – author and Baptist missionary
- James T. Draper Jr. – president of the Southern Baptist Convention, 1982–1984; president of Nashville-based LifeWay Christian Resources, 1991–2006
- W. T. Handy, Jr. – United Methodist bishop, died in Nashville

=== Sportspeople ===
- Mookie Betts – baseball player
- Nico Carvacho (born 1997) – basketball power forward/center in the Israeli Basketball Premier League
- Tracy Caulkins – three-time Olympic gold medalist swimmer
- Eddie George – Heisman Trophy winner, four-time Pro Bowl NFL running back, businessman and professional actor
- Sonny Gray – Major League Baseball pitcher
- Scott Hamilton – world champion and Olympic gold medalist ice skater
- Demonte Harper (born 1989) – basketball player in the Israeli Basketball Premier League
- Mike Hasenfratz – National Hockey League referee
- Adam Hooker – 2008 Slamball League MVP and starting stopper for Champion Slashers
- Andy Kirby – NASCAR driver
- Jessica Kresa – professional wrestler, known as ODB
- Herb Rich (1928–2008) – 2x All-Pro NFL football player
- Wilma Rudolph – track star and Olympic gold medalist
- Martin Strel – long-distance swimmer, Big River Man and actor from Slovenia

=== Criminals and victims ===
- Jesse James – notorious outlaw and bank robber
- Abdulhakim Mujahid Muhammad, fka Carlos Leon Bledsoe – committed the 2009 jihadi Little Rock military recruiting office shooting
- Paul Dennis Reid – serial killer nicknamed “The Fast Food Killer”
- Oscar Franklin Smith – convicted murderer on Tennessee's death row
- Marcia Trimble – victim of an infamous child murder case

=== Other ===
- Mary R. Calvert (1884–1974) – astronomical computer and astrophotographer
- Joseph Fuisz – attorney, inventor, and entrepreneur; founder of Fuisz Pharma LLC
- Richard Fuisz – physician, inventor, and entrepreneur, with connections to the United States military and intelligence community
- James N. Hardin Jr. – Germanist
- Amelia Laskey – ornithologist
- Nat Love – famous African-American cowboy and hero of the Old West
- Ronal W. Serpas – chief of the Metropolitan Nashville Police Department, 2004–2010

== See also ==
- List of people from Tennessee
