= Adult Swim Yule Log 2: Branchin' Out =

2024 film by Casper Kelly

- Genre: Black comedy Surreal humor Comedy horror Thriller; Romantic comedy
- Created by: Casper Kelly
- Written by: Casper Kelly
- Directed by: Casper Kelly
- Starring: Andrea Laing; Michael Shenefelt; Sharon Blackwood; Asher Alexander; Jesse Malinowski; Chase Steven Anderson
- Country of origin: United States
- Original language: English

Production
- Executive producers: Casper Kelly; Kelly Crews; Cameron Tang; Melissa Warrenburg
- Producers: Matt Foster; Alan Steadman; Phil Samson
- Cinematography: Alex Allgood
- Editors: Phil Samson; Jonathan Pawlowski
- Running time: 87 minutes
- Production companies: Media Team; Williams Street; Fried Society

Original release
- Network: Adult Swim
- Release: December 6, 2024

Related
- Adult Swim Yule Log

Adult Swim Yule Log 2: Branchin' Out is a surreal romantic comedy horror film that originally aired as a special on Adult Swim on December 6, 2024. It was created, written, and directed by Casper Kelly, and produced by Williams Street. Created as a sequel to his previous film, Adult Swim Yule Log (also titled The Fireplace), it follows the events of the earlier film, where the surviving protagonist, Zoe, must navigate the traumatic horror movie experiences she suffered while trying to move on with her life, before finding herself inadvertently trapped within a traditional Christmas romantic comedy. The film serves as a meta commentary on both the horror movie and traditional Hallmark Christmas romantic comedy genres.

The film aired on December 6, 2024, at midnight on Adult Swim and was also made available for streaming on Max on December 7, 2024.

== Plot ==
Following the events of the previous film, Zoe survived the Yule Log's attack, but Alex was killed. Police believe they were attacked by Pleatherface, disbelieving Zoe's story about the Yule Log being sentient or the other supernatural events that occurred. The Yule Log breaks out of the evidence locker, setting off an explosion that destroys Alex's video evidence.

Believing the log is after her, Zoe has a panic attack during a client meeting and is fired from her job at the Coral Conservancy. Her friend Jakesy consoles her and pushes her to go on vacation and break out of her horror movie past into a cheery "Hallmark"-style romantic comedy. As they drive, Santa Claus observes them and uses his magic to stall their car in the small town of Mistletoe, where Zoe experiences shifts from the dreary horror movie setting into a lighter and more cheerful Christmas movie, complete with happy music and a brighter cinematographic palette. A local mechanic tells them that it will take several days to fix the car and that the town is set to celebrate its annual Yule Log Festival.

Zoe is desperate to escape and runs into obnoxious wealthy influencer Beauregard before encountering recent widower Birt and his mother, Nana, who run Savannah's Christmas Ornaments, named after his deceased wife, along with his young son, Jaxon. Beauregard reveals himself to be the owner of a large rival ornament store that threatens to put Birt out of business. Zoe and Birt bond over the loss of their partners, whose cremated ashes they both have yet to scatter, and Zoe grows attracted to Birt, eventually opening up about the events of her trauma to him.

Believing her, Birt posits that the log may have been destroyed in the explosion and helps Zoe conquer her fear using an EMDR-type device. Zoe, now truly confident for the first time, immerses herself in the town, helping the store and staying with Birt and his family. Birt recounts how Savannah developed a shrimp fudge recipe that he could never recreate following her death, but Zoe manages to find Savannah's complete recipe. She successfully recreates it with Jaxon. When some accidentally drips on a coral ornament, Jaxon notices that it causes the coral to grow.

Meanwhile, the yule log has indeed managed to find Zoe but is intercepted and destroyed by Santa and Holly, who survived the first film. Unbeknownst to both of them, a splinter of the log survives and flies off, lodging itself into Nana's hand. Zoe sees visions of a tiny Nana inside the freezer and climbs in. Inside, tiny Nana tells Zoe that only love's remains will defeat the hate, as Zoe sees Alex and Savannah boxing together. On Christmas Day, Birt's family gathers for dinner, but the celebration turns to horror as the yule log gruesomely emerges from within Nana's body, turning her into a log creature. Zoe experiences disorienting fluctuations as the movie's palette shifts between romance and horror.

The creature infects and ignites the town's yule logs, which massacre the citizens. Jaxon, believing Nana has merely gained superpowers, tries to help her, but it attacks him. Zoe and Birt fight the logs, which only regenerate. Remembering what Nana told her, Zoe and Birt confess their love and throw Alex and Savannah's ashes—love's remains—on the creature. Alex and Savannah's spirits destroy the creature. Though the log has been defeated, Zoe still decides to leave town. Birt prepares to close the store, but fans of the massacre arrive, willing to pay handsomely for ornaments made by the now-infamous Nana.

One month later, Birt rebranded the store as an ornament, shrimp fudge, and yule log massacre museum to great success. Zoe returns, prepared to begin a life with Birt. Zoe's old boss arrives, offering to rehire her after learning that the fudge restores coral. As Birt and Zoe celebrate, Jaxon secretly applies the fudge to a twig left by the yule log, telling "Nana" that he'll bring her back. As the movie shifts back to the horror palette, the Little Man in the Fire, the Alien, cultists, and other horrors from the first film descend upon the happy occupants within the store.

== Cast ==
- Andrea Laing as Zoe, a woman who survived a supernatural attack by a sentient yule log in the first film
- Michael Shenefelt as Birthday "Birt" Card, a widowed ornament shop owner in Mistletoe
- Sharon Blackwood as Nana, Birt's mother
- Asher Alexander as Jaxon, Birt's son
- Jesse Malinowski as Beauregard, a wealthy influencer and Birt's competitor
- Chase Steven Anderson as Jakesy, Zoe's sassy gay best friend
- Justin Miles as Alex, Zoe's fiancé who dies following the events of the first film
- Danielia Maximillian-Almeda as Holly, a girl who survived the events of the first film by fleeing to parts unknown
- Charles Green as the Little Man in the Fire, a mysterious malevolent figure associated to the yule log who taunted Zoe and other victims in the first film

Actors Sean Hankinson, Hannah Alline, and Skye Passmore appear in video footage scenes from the first film.

== Development and production ==
Kelly began writing the sequel around the time he had watched his first holiday romantic comedy, Holiday in Handcuffs at the suggestion of a member of his film club. Despite the genre's tropes, he found himself engaged with it, interested in how the genre could make viewers both laugh at its quality but also be emotionally involving. He opted to write the sequel with more levity, compared to the trend of sequels being darker or grittier. Kelly opted for the sequel to play with the duality of tropes from both the romantic comedy and horror movie genres. The script employs many tropes from Hallmark romantic comedies, including a gay best friend, a town full of handsome, single men, and a long lost family recipe. Kelly also cited the Halloween franchise's following of "final girl" Laurie Strode as attracting him to continue Zoe's story as the film's protagonist.

Filming took place in June 2024 over four weeks in Cartersville, Georgia under the working title "Branchin' Out". Like the first film, many of the cast and crew were local to Atlanta and Georgia. Production employed various practical effects, including a "log cam" which used a real log duct taped to the front of a camera to achieve the shots from the log's perspective. To emphasize the duality of the film's two genres, cinematography for the film utilized a blue color palette and letterbox effects for horror scenes, while switching to a brighter palette and no letterboxing for the cheerier romantic comedy scenes, oftentimes switching rapidly back and forth throughout the film. Composer Jonathan Snipes, who provided music for The Shining documentary Room 237 was brought on to compose music to highlight the contrast between the two genres.

Thematically, Kelly describes the film as continuing a discussion on how one perceives the world and whether to live life optimistically or in fear. He also felt the reality of the film's ending could be interpreted ambiguously, and hinted at his own interpretation of it as Zoe's delusion during her hospital recovery. When asked about the film, Andrea Laing stated, “I hope audiences take away this sense of acceptance—acceptance that life is messy...and that it’s okay to find humor in the weirdest, most inexplicable parts of our journey.”

== Release ==
The film aired on December 6, 2024, at midnight on Adult Swim and was also available for streaming on Max on December 7, 2024.

== Reception ==
Critics gave the film mixed reviews, praising the continued absurdity and meta commentary of the first film, while criticizing its inability to outdo its predecessor. James Kent of Mountain Times gave the film a mixed review, stating, "Still, if I am being honest, 'Yule Log 2: Branching Out' left me disappointed. However, if I am still being honest, I’ll be the first one to watch “Yule Log 3” whenever Adult Swim chooses to surprise me with another sequel."

Writing for Bloody Disgusting, Daniel Kurland in a positive review, awarded it 4 out of 5 on their review scale, stating, "Adult Swim Yule Log 2 actively uses the subtext of horror sequels to tell a story about second chances. This ridiculous, silly experiment becomes a harrowing meditation on PTSD, survivor's guilt, and how to reclaim power and manifest a happy ending that's a must-watch horror movie."

== Possible sequel ==
Kelly stated that he had ideas for a third film, and also joked about building a 31-film franchise.
