= Your Pretty Face Is Going to Hell =

American sitcom

- Genre: Black comedy; Slapstick; Workplace comedy; Satire
- Created by: Casper Kelly; Dave Willis
- Starring: Craig Rowin; Matt Servitto; Henry Zebrowski; Dana Snyder
- Country of origin: United States
- Original language: English
- No. of seasons: 4
- No. of episodes: 42 (and 1 pilot)

Production
- Executive producers: Casper Kelly; Dave Willis; Alex Orr; Ashley Kohler; Mike Lazzo; Keith Crofford
- Running time: 11–12 minutes
- Production companies: Fake Wood Wallpaper Films; Williams Street

Original release
- Network: Adult Swim
- Release: January 20, 2011
- Release: April 18, 2013 – June 14, 2019

Your Pretty Face Is Going to Hell is an American adult sitcom created by Casper Kelly and Dave Willis for Cartoon Network's nighttime programming block Adult Swim. It aired from April 18, 2013, to June 14, 2019. The show is a live-action workplace comedy about Gary, an associate demon, as he attempts to capture souls on Earth to climb the corporate ladder of the underworld. Gary hopes to advance in Hell, but he may be too stupid, lazy, and kind-hearted to realize his dreams of promotion.

The show was renewed for a fourth and final season, which began production on June 5, 2017. The fourth and final season premiered on May 3, 2019.

On July 13, 2020, co-creator Dave Willis announced that a one-off extended finale special was in the works, with the possibility of internet-exclusive shorts in the future. The extended finale was eventually scrapped, but the internet-exclusive shorts, known as Your Pretty Face Is Going to Hell: The Cartoon (originally announced as Your Pretty Face Is Going to Hell: The Animated Series), were released on October 21, 2022, on Adult Swim's YouTube channel.

The show is titled after a song from the 1973 album Raw Power by the Stooges.

== Characters ==
- Gary Bunda (Henry Zebrowski) – a bumbling employee in Hell whose schemes to condemn human souls to Hell often fail.
- Claude Vernon (Craig Rowin) – Gary's younger and more-respected intern who often shows him up at work. The character wasn't present for the 1st half of season 3, though no mention is made of what became of him. He returned in the 2nd half of season 3, starting with the episode "Golden Fiddle Week".
- "Satan", a.k.a. *Darren Farley (Matt Servitto) – Gary's boss, who presents himself in seasons 1 and 2 as Satan, ruler of Hell. In season 3, it is revealed that his true identity is Darren Farley, a demon who rose the ranks to middle management and runs the 11th circle of Hell, for "Miscellaneous" sins.
- Lucas (Dana Snyder, Seasons 1 & 2) – Gary's still-living former roommate. He is annoyed when Gary returns to Earth to recruit him.
- Benji (Dan Triandiflou) – one of Gary's co-workers in Hell. He's usually in charge of making the orientation and 'how to' videos of Hell. Formerly a TV weatherman in Charlotte, he was arrested by the FBI for raping, murdering, and cannibalizing 143 children.
- Troy Ersatz (Dana Snyder, Season 3 & 4) – Gary's co-worker in Hell who replaced Claude for most of season 3, is different from Snyder's other character Lucas. Unlike Claude, Troy tends to end up suffering alongside Gary when their various schemes backfire and was once temporarily demoted to "tortured soul" status.
- Eddie (Eddie Pepitone) – a tortured soul. He's often seen as the victim of various acts of sadism brought on by the demons or Satan himself. He gets briefly promoted to demon status when Troy is demoted, in season 3, but Eddie is traumatized by the horrors inflicted upon him by the other demons, and having a heart of gold, he fails to live up to the job. He still won out over Troy and earned his place as a real demon, but was demoted following a behind-the-scenes "real life" scene depicting Eddie Pepitone's refusal to go through the make-up procedures.
- Demon William (William Tokarsky), William is the very 1st demon that we see and he comes back in 15 of the episodes in all 4 seasons.

== Episodes ==
Season	Episodes	Originally released	
Season	Episodes	First released	Last released
Pilot		January 20, 2011	
1	6	April 18, 2013	May 23, 2013
2	12	July 12, 2015	October 11, 2015
3	12	October 23, 2016	May 7, 2017
4	12	May 4, 2019	June 14, 2019

=== Original pilot (2011) ===
Title	Original release date
"Pilot"	January 20, 2011
After attending a self-help-like conference, two friends go to Hell and receive eternal unlimited virgins, pumpkin-flavored lattes and trees full of pizza. After several weeks these luxuries lose their appeal and the duo attempt escaping.

=== Season 1 (2013) ===
No. overall	No. in season	Title	Directed by	Written by	Original release date	Prod. code	US viewers (millions)
1	1	"Welcome to Hell"	Casper Kelly	Casper Kelly & Dave Willis	April 18, 2013	101	1.50
Gary and Claude are tasked to make a God-praising pro baseball player start giving thanks for his success to Satan instead.
2	2	"Bone Garden"	Dave Willis	Casper Kelly & Dave Willis	April 25, 2013	102	1.67
Gary has to protect the Devil's sex condo from being sold. Also, the Devil's mistress is Gary's first love.
3	3	"Take Life by the Horns"	Casper Kelly	Casper Kelly & Dave Willis	May 2, 2013	103	1.46
A plan to put Satan's face on the nickel leaves Gary stranded in the Appalachian mountains.
4	4	"Schmickler83!"	Dave Willis	Casper Kelly & Dave Willis	May 9, 2013	104	1.63
Gary loses his summon word at a concert. Whoever finds it will have total control of Gary.
5	5	"Devil in the Details"	Casper Kelly	Casper Kelly, Dave Willis & Jon Wurster	May 16, 2013	105	1.56
Gary goes "back to school" to help a high school drama class make a Satan-glorifying musical.
6	6	"People in Hell Want Ice Water"	Dave Willis	Casper Kelly & Dave Willis	May 23, 2013	106	1.86
The Devil has his demons compete for a drink of ice water.

=== Season 2 (2015) ===
No. overall	No. in season	Title	Directed by	Written by	Original release date	Prod. code	US viewers (millions)
7	1	"Psyklone and the Thin Twins"	Casper Kelly & Dave Willis	Casper Kelly & Dave Willis	July 12, 2015	201	0.77
Gary, stranded on Earth, attempts to start up a business while trying to get his Born Again Christian step-brother to hide him from the demons sent by Satan to take him back to Hell.
8	2	"Shoulder Work"	Casper Kelly & Dave Willis	Casper Kelly & Dave Willis	July 19, 2015	202	0.86
Learning the ability to shrink down and stand upon peoples' shoulders to try and manipulate them into doing evil, Gary struggles with his rival, an Angel who tries to get people to do good.
9	3	"Jett Copperhead, Six-pack Magician"	Casper Kelly & Dave Willis	Casper Kelly & Dave Willis	July 26, 2015	205	0.94
Satan calls on Gary and Claude to accompany him to Las Vegas, where he intends to collect on a contract he signed four years ago with a famous magician, Jett Copperhead. In return for his immortal soul, Satan granted Jett four years of dark magic. The demons meet Jett, drunk and washed-up, in a Vegas hotel room, where he promises additional souls for Satan in return for one more month of magic. After signing over his family's souls, Jett takes the stage one last time, only to trap Satan, Gary, and Claude in a cage, bound by a cross. The trio easily escape after tipping the cage over, and Satan kills the magician by exploding his head on stage. Once in Hell, the now-dead Jett manages to escape torture and evade Satan, who failed to notice that the contract was changed to read "powers after death" instead of "until death". Infuriated, Satan threatens Jett's wife and children, but when Claude actually follows through and kills the family, Satan admits he has no leverage left. On the elevator ride up from Hell with the magician's "cleaning lady" (whom Gary mistakenly brought to Hell as a hostage), Jett reveals himself to have been hiding as her the entire time, and Satan hiding as Claude, prompting Gary to panic and try to figure out who's impersonating him as the elevator descends back into Hell.
10	4	"True Love Will Find You"	Dave Willis	Casper Kelly & Dave Willis	August 2, 2015	206	1.02
At lunch, a woman rides in on a flying monster and saves one of the demons. Satan reluctantly informs the demons that, if someone with true love for a damned soul manages several heroic feats, they can return with them to the surface world. Satan then grants the group 48 hours on Earth to try and find someone to save them. Claude schemes to have an obsessed one-night stand from college rescue him. Gary attempts to have his mother rescue him, but she declines after her priest advises against it. Claude succeeds, (by giving his stalker specific instructions and tools to complete the challenges) but his salvation turns to an even greater nightmare when his crush promptly imprisons him inside her home for a year, forcing Claude to kill himself to return to hell. At the end of the episode, Claude attempts to explain himself to Satan, only for his stalker to return and carry him off again.
11	5	"New-cronomicon"	Dave Willis	Casper Kelly & Dave Willis	August 9, 2015	211	1.08
The demons compete to get Satan's new book, which masquerades as a supernatural teen romance novel, readers on Earth.
12	6	"Witches"	Casper Kelly	Casper Kelly & Dave Willis	August 16, 2015	208	0.93
Gary, Claude, and the rest of the minions are ordered by Satan to take his place at the annual witches' orgy.
13	7	"Cerberus"	Casper Kelly	Casper Kelly & Dave Willis	August 30, 2015	207	1.04
Gary is tasked with tying Cerberus, Satan's beloved dog, to the back gate of Hell. But after the dog runs to Earth and takes Gary with him, Gary promises to show the dog's three heads a great time on Earth. Unfortunately, Cerberus is an unrepentant believer of antisemitism, which leads to Gary killing the dog and giving Satan a kitten as a replacement.
14	8	"Nü-Byle"	Dave Willis	Casper Kelly & Dave Willis	September 13, 2015	204	0.94
Satan, angry at modern music, attempts to reunite his favorite '80s era heavy metal band "Byle". Gary is assigned the task to get the now aging rockers in shape for their big comeback, only to find out that the band loathe Satan and treated the sycophantic Satan as their personal slave. Despite Gary and Claude's protests, Byle performs their new song, "Velvet Lurker", which mocks Satan as "The Prince of Dorkness". Once Satan realizes the lyrics are mocking him, he orders Claude to burn down the concert venue. In Hell, Byle is forced to perform the same song for an eternity, to the point their bodies deteriorate into living skeletons.
15	9	"National Lampoon's Fireballz"	Casper Kelly	Casper Kelly & Dave Willis	September 20, 2015	203	0.97
Satan decides to make a chicken hell, and all the demons are sent to excavate it. During the excavation they come across a rift in space which shows naked women. They soon find out that there is a slut circle where all the fornicators are kept. In an attempt to reach it, Gary covers himself with peanut butter and gets swallowed by a monster which spits him out. But he overshoots the slut circle and lands in chicken hell, where he meets Medusa and gets turned to stone.
16	10	"Spunk"	Dave Willis	Casper Kelly & Dave Willis	September 27, 2015	210	1.06
The Demons in hell discover they can make wine for them to get intoxicated from and enjoy. Satan finds them all intoxicated from the drink while working and is offered some of the wine for him to try. After a psychedelic experience, Satan decides he is going to kill the spider that the demons use to help make the wine, but the Demons propose that they produce more of the wine for the people of Earth to drink and destroy themselves. Production on an advertisement they decide to make ensues and the final commercial ends up looking not even close to the standard Satan and the demons had envisioned. The spider is finally found to not be able to produce the wine ingredients anymore, leaving only one bottle of the wine left. Gary and Claude are challenged to fight over the last bottle, only to find in the end the side effects of the bottle make their heads explode.
17	11	"Krampus Nacht"	Casper Kelly	Casper Kelly & Dave Willis	October 4, 2015	212	0.98
It is Christmas time in hell and Satan comes in to talk to Gary and Claude about an old friend he once had named Krampus. Him and Krampus used to terrorize bad children on Christmas, and now Satan has the idea of bringing Krampus back in to business. He sends Gary and Claude to go get Krampus and tell him to come out of retirement. Once Krampus is back in work, Gary and Claude decide the Krampus' methods are too extreme for teaching children lessons, and they decide that they want to stop Krampus before he goes to Gary's step nephew's house to punish him. In the climax of their rescue attempt, the two demons find Krampus in a struggle with a mall security guard. The two stop Krampus from continuing his plans and send him off in a van. The final scene shows Gary's step-nephew receiving the christmas gift he wanted that was secretly given to him by Gary.
18	12	"Heaven"	Casper Kelly	Casper Kelly & Dave Willis	October 11, 2015	209	0.91
Gary is called into Satan's office and told that when he died he was supposed to go to Heaven and not Hell. Gary, thrilled by this news, is sent to Heaven to explore all of the treats and pleasures the place has to offer. After being introduced to the lifestyles and work environments of Heaven, Gary finds that he needs to go to the bathroom. This is unusual, for people in Heaven do not need to go to the bathroom, but when he attempts to relieve himself, he finds that Claude and the other demons are shrunken and inside of him. Gary was sent on a sabotage mission to infiltrate Heaven, and the demons go around the palaces so they can plant dynamite. Once Heaven is destroyed, the angels discover Gary was behind it and he is sent back to Hell.

=== Season 3 (2016–17) ===
Dana Snyder, who played Gary's best friend Lucas in seasons 1–2, was made a series regular. However, rather than continuing in the role of Lucas, Snyder was cast in a new role as "Troy", a new demon coworker for Gary.

No. overall	No. in season	Title	Directed by	Written by	Original release date	Prod. code	US viewers (millions)
19	1	"Straight Outta Hades"	Dave Willis	Casper Kelly & Dave Willis	October 23, 2016	301	0.99
Gary produces a hip, new orientation video to prepare new arrivals for Hell. Gary produces several new videos, all variations on "Straight Outta Hades", ripping off the N.W.A classic "Straight Outta Compton". Eventually, the video series spirals out of control, leaving Gary only 24 hours to produce one video for every letter of the alphabet. Benji, who was previously removed from video production in favor of Gary, helps Gary finish the videos in time. At the time of the premiere, Satan reveals that there is no audience, and that Gary and Benji will be forced to watch the training videos for the next 50 years.
20	2	"Circle Jerk MCMCVIII"	Dave Willis	Casper Kelly & Dave Willis	October 30, 2016	302	1.07
Satan attends a work conference with other demons, where it is revealed that he is not actually Satan, but Darren Farley, Senior Vice President of the 11th Circle of Hell, "Miscellaneous". After a disastrous presentation on terrorism (put together at the last minute by Gary and Troy), the real Satan (Damian Young) reveals that Miscellaneous will be flooded with bile and transferred into the Treachery department. In an attempt to stop the takeover, Satan rigs the explosives meant to flood the office to instead blow up the real Satan and the head of Treachery. However, after Gary and Troy both flee, a series of betrayals lead to the head of Treachery and Satan being pushed over the cliff, leaving Kip, the head of Gluttony, an obese demon, as the new Satan. In order to protect his secret, Satan lobotomizes Gary and Troy using chopsticks.
21	3	"Three Demons and a Demon Baby"	Casper Kelly	Craig Rowin, Casper Kelly & Dave Willis	November 6, 2016	303	1.22
Satan wants to have a kid, but a snake transformation and Gary lead to a very messed-up result.
22	4	"Healy"	Casper Kelly	Casper Kelly & Dave Willis	November 13, 2016	304	0.91
An alien creature, after being shot by a young child, arrives in Hell. Gary, ecstatic at the prospect of extraterrestrial life, rescues "Healy" from torture and has him join the office. Satan orders Gary to decapitate Healy, but Gary instead helps Healy escape to a secret government facility where his body is being held. Upon discovering that his body is dissected beyond repair, Healy promises to bring Gary to his home planet if he helps call his brother. A massive alien spacecraft arrives right before Satan can permanently destroy Healy's soul, and Healy cuts off his own feet in order to get rid of Gary. At the end of the episode, Satan threatens to punish Gary for trying to escape Hell, but is disgusted by Gary's apparent enthusiasm.
23	5	"The Tree-Huger Bomber"	Casper Kelly	Andy Lucy, Casper Kelly & Dave Willis	November 20, 2016	305	1.04
Ted, a demon with a fondness for dolphins and the environment, is given a roast after 25 years in Hell. At the roast, Satan reveals that Ted is the "Tree Huger Bomber", a semi-literate ecoterrorist who choked to death on an acorn in the Montana wilderness. Furious at the humiliation, Ted attempts to bomb Satan and his co-workers, but fails due to lack of ingredients. His living CPU helps Ted get over his fear of technology and learn more about bomb-making, resulting in a terror campaign across Hell. Ted's computer encourages him to return to the surface to repossess his body. Immediately after regaining his body, Ted's computer shoots out CDs to slash his ankles, then turns in Ted to the FBI for the $2 million bounty. After being executed, Ted returns to Hell, where Satan condemns him to torture dolphins. Gary and other demons appear to help Ted out, offering to reattach the dolphins' snouts and disinfect their wounds.
24	6	"Torture"	Dave Willis	Casper Kelly & Dave Willis	November 27, 2016	306	1.01
After tortured soul Eddie complains about the quality of torture in Hell, Satan calls in a "torture coach" (Jon Glaser) to inspire the demons. The demon with the worst torture at the end of the seminar gets demoted to a tortured soul. Gary, desperate to come up with something, resorts to ripping off a horror franchise that scarred him as a child. When he tries it out on his victim, the tortured soul immediately realizes that Gary stole the idea. Gary winds up bringing the soul to the surface in order to reconnect with his estranged father, only for the victim to lock Gary in a car with the puppet from his childhood threatening him outside. The "victim" is actually Gary's co-worker Troy, who is declared the winner of the torture contest. However, Gary manages to hotwire the car and escape. He meets with his father, who apologizes for Gary's childhood trauma before they go fishing on a lake. As a result, Troy is demoted, since Gary accidentally accomplished Troy's greatest fear: being shown up by Gary.
25	7	"Eddie the Demon"	Dave Willis	Casper Kelly & Dave Willis	April 2, 2017	307	0.98
Troy's horns are removed by Satan and he becomes a tortured soul while Eddie is promoted to a demon. However, Eddie is having a hard time adapting to his new demon job, having flashbacks of being a tortured soul and hesitating making dark choices in a simulation program. Meanwhile, Troy is doing everything he can to sabotage Eddie so he can become a demon again. In the end, Satan decides to challenge the two with a wall climbing and ringing a bell. Despite Troy actually climbing it up, Eddie won by simply ringing the bell Troy ripped off. Although it shows Eddie and the other demons happy, the scene is cut to the real life actors in a make-up session where Eddie is complaining about the painting process. He tells the writers that this is the only time he wants to do it, although they already had the rest of the season planned out for Eddie to be a demon. Dana Snyder (Troy's actor) is shown to be happy he no longer has to go through the process. However, after talking with Eddie's agent, the writers swapped Eddie's and Troy's role again, much to Dana's dismay.
26	8	"Golden Fiddle Week"	Dave Willis	Casper Kelly & Dave Willis	April 9, 2017	308	1.15
Troy loses one of Satan's golden fiddles in trivia contest to a bar fly named Todd (played by Andrew Bowser). He then must win it back with the help of Gary, Claude, Dizzay and some rotten fruit from the Tree of Knowledge.
27	9	"Lee"	Casper Kelly	Casper Kelly & Dave Willis	April 16, 2017	309	1.25
Satan brings some women into the workplace and Gary gets serious with a spooky Onryō named Lee.
28	10	"Hammerman"	Dave Willis	Casper Kelly & Dave Willis	April 23, 2017	310	1.00
After a significant drop in souls from Dr. Paul Nickgibbion's assisted suicide program, Satan sends Gary and Claude out to confront him, only to learn about his newest invention: a robot designed to "ethically" kill his patients. Meanwhile, Gary tries to date one of Nickgibion's patients.
29	11	"Snow Job"	Casper Kelly	Andy Lucy, Casper Kelly & Dave Willis	April 30, 2017	311	1.15
Dustin Diamond is dead, and Satan decides that his torture will be starring in a cheesy sitcom for all eternity. Things eventually go out of hand with the show, causing all of Hell to literally freeze over.
30	12	"The Dammed"	Casper Kelly	Matt Foster, Casper Kelly & Dave Willis	May 7, 2017	312	1.15
While investigating a clog in the soul intake line, Gary and Claude discover Nazi doctor Josef Mengele using beavers to clone Adolf Hitler. With Hitler's clone, Mengele intends on taking over Hell using a giant robot.

=== Season 4 (2019) ===
No. overall	No. in season	Title	Directed by	Written by	Original release date	Prod. code	US viewers (millions)
31	1	"The Flip"	Dave Willis	Casper Kelly & Dave Willis	May 3, 2019	401	0.52
Because Gary is making bad deals and not getting souls, Satan schedules special training tor his minions with a special theme song by a Chubby Checker knock-off called "Beefy Backgammon". The demons are trained to twist (flip) their victims' words around so as to not grant their actual desires in their damnation-deals.
32	2	"The Poor Horsemen of the Apocalypse"	Dave Willis	Andy Lucy, Casper Kelly & Dave Willis	May 3, 2019	402	0.49
The comically-aged Four Horsemen (George Wendt, John Amos, Tony Hendra, Lory Tom Thompson Sr.) from the biblical Revelation myth are disgruntled with their current contract with Satan. They threaten to strike to win this absurd labor dispute. Satan assigns five of his trusted demons as new horsemen (increased headcount being one of the demands of the original four) to swing the vote against a strike.
33	3	"OMGouija"	Casper Kelly	Christina Romo, Casper Kelly & Dave Willis	May 10, 2019	403	0.44
Amy (Hazel Armenante), a socially-outcast adolescent girl, is given a present by her parents. This is a Ouija board, updated by Satan with modern emoticons, enabling the user to communicate with the dead. Gary feels sorry for her, and tries clumsily to make her "the most popular girl in school". He comes to her school in the persona of Joey Fatone, which backfires and further ostracizing Amy at her school. She ends up as the most popular; the demons inadvertently kill the rest of the girls in the school.
34	4	"The High Heel"	Casper Kelly	Matt Foster, Casper Kelly & Dave Willis	May 10, 2019	404	0.39
A wacky doomsday cult based on foot fetishism commits mass suicide. Upon their arrival in hell they recognize Gary as their messiah, the so-called "High Heel". Predictably, Gary gets carried away with his self-importance and his new adored status, and angers Satan and his fellow demons with his aloofness and conceit.
35	5	"The Party Hole"	Casper Kelly	Nick Gibbons, Casper Kelly & Dave Willis	May 17, 2019	405	0.43
Some lower rank demons, led by Gary, endeavour to tempt people on their deathbeds to enter hell by way of a 'party hole'. They are not achieving great results until they simply start kidnapping living people and imprisoning them in a cave in hell which greatly enhances their tally of souls. Eventually Claude discovers the cave and its prisoners and informs Satan, however Satan does not seem too concerned and Gary is only punished with a literal slap on the wrist.
36	6	"Trial by Gary"	Dave Willis	Casper Kelly & Dave Willis	May 17, 2019	406	0.40
When a tortured soul named "Goodie" files for re-review over an outdated rule about eating meat on a Friday, Satan holds a trial and it's up to Gary to prove Goodie's innocence and qualification to go to Heaven instead. Meanwhile, on behalf of Satan, Troy tries to prove that Goodie isn't as good as he seems.
37	7	"Stan the Man"	Dave Willis	Casper Kelly & Dave Willis	May 31, 2019	407	0.38
After learning about a right-wing conspiracy radio talk-show hosted by someone named "Stan the Man", Satan takes over as the host of the show and eventually gets a bit too engrossed with his new role.
38	8	"Gary Bunda: Demon Killer"	Casper Kelly	Nick Gibbons, Casper Kelly & Dave Willis	May 31, 2019	408	0.40
When Gary gets kidnapped by a ghost-hunting show, he must choose between fame and friendship. He chooses fame.
39	9	"Milk and Honey"	Matt Servitto	Casper Kelly & Dave Willis	June 7, 2019	409	0.43
When Hell runs out of ball clamps, Satan sends his best men to buy more at a torture convention. Gary is seduced by a saleswoman and spends all the money he was given on hundreds of boats instead.
40	10	"Five-Card Duds"	Casper Kelly	Todd Doogan, Casper Kelly & Dave Willis	June 7, 2019	410	0.37
Gary and Troy go to Vegas to steal the soul of a famous poker player by having him sign his life away in a deal, promising his victory in an upcoming poker competition. Unfortunately, the two get extremely drunk and unknowingly sign two other people up for the same deal. Because three people cannot win the same poker competition, Gary and Troy try their best to fix the problem.
41	11	"Conceal and Gary"	Todd Rohal	Todd Rohal, Casper Kelly & Dave Willis	June 14, 2019	411	0.42
After Gary gets shot by one of the unborn, Satan institutes an unsensible gun policy to ensure something like that will happen again.
42	12	"Fried Alive"	Dave Willis	Matt Foster, Casper Kelly & Dave Willis	June 14, 2019	412	0.35
Gary and Satan decide to reboot their favorite fast-food horror movie franchise, but they may have bitten off more than they can chew.
