= Bad Girls Road Trip =

2007 American reality television series

- Genre: Reality
- Starring: Aimee Landi; Zara Sprankle; Leslie Ramsue
- Theme music composer: Lady Sovereign
- Opening theme: "Love Me or Hate Me"
- Country of origin: United States
- Original language: English
- No. of seasons: 1
- No. of episodes: 6

Production
- Executive producer: Jonathan Murray
- Running time: 22 minutes
- Production company: Bunim/Murray Productions

Original release
- Network: Oxygen
- Release: June 12 – July 24, 2007

Related
- Bad Girls Club

Bad Girls Road Trip is an American reality television series which aired on Oxygen from June 12, 2007, to July 24, 2007. It is the first spin-off of Bad Girls Club. Bad Girls Road Trip stars season one alumni Zara Sprankle, Aimee Landi, and Leslie Ramsue, who tour their respective hometowns, search for casting opportunities for the second season of Bad Girls Club and visit some of their former housemates.

== Cast ==
=== Main ===
- Zara Sprankle is one of the original Bad Girls and one of the three to make it the whole season. She was known for several dramatic episodes.
- Leslie Ramsue is one of the original Bad Girls. She didn't make it the whole season, but was seen in the season one finale of the show. She was known for her career as a stripper and her friendship with housemate Ty.
- Aimee Landi is one of the original Bad Girls and like Zara, was one of the three to make it the whole season.

=== Guest ===
- DeAnn appeared in the first episode of Road Trip along with Kerry. DeAnn moved in the Bad Girls House after Ripsi was removed after a physical altercation with Kerry and Jodie.
- Kerry Harvick appeared in episode one of Road Trip. Kerry is known for being very sneaky and catty, like Zara and Aimee lasted the whole season of The Bad Girls Club.
- Jodie appeared in the third and fourth episode of Road Trip. Jodie left the show without letting anyone know except for Joanna, so she had to explain why she left right before the finale.
- Joanna came on the Road Trip in fifth episode and after being ditched at the end of episode five, they found their roommates again in episode six. One of the 'replacement' Bad Girls, she came in after Ty was removed the show after a physical altercation with Aimee.
- Andrea Laing along with Joanna came on Road Trip in episode five and six. She is also one of the 'replacement' Bad Girls, she came in after Leslie left on her own terms.
- Ripsi joined her roommates for the Road Trip in episode six, the season finale.

== Episodes ==
No.	Title	Original release date
1	"Bad Wheels Keep On Turning"	June 12, 2007
The trip begins in Nashville, Tennessee. Zara, Aimee, and Leslie hook up with housemates Kerry and DeAnn at a Grateful Dead fan event. After calling a casting event, they expected to see many fans, but they see only a few and become embarrassed. One female fan continuously flirts with Leslie and repeatedly calls her "sexy and delicious". Leslie keeps running away from the lesbian feeling very uncomfortable. This didn't make a good impression of Nashville on the girls.
2	"Caddy Issues"	June 19, 2007
The Bad Girls head up to Leslie's hometown of Atlanta where they run into conflict as Leslie steals the spotlight. They become extremely angry with Leslie for "acting like a queen" and thinking "the world revolved around her". Zara wants to kick her out of the road trip. After refusing to go with her to Diddy's restaurant, Leslie becomes very upset and an argument breaks out between the girls. Yet another lesbian fan flirts with Leslie at this point. Leaving the town, Leslie calls her friends bikers and wants to have a ride on a bike, while Zara and Aimee decide to go by their car. On an abrupt turn, their brake fries and Aimee, unable to stop the car and at high speed, manages to bring the car to a ditch.
3	"Tranny Trouble"	June 26, 2007
While heading to Baltimore, the girls organize a meeting with Jodie who is willing to see them and has called an event. Having arrived late, Aimee rings up Jodie to cancel their meeting. Jodie becomes upset and doesn't turn up for their radio broadcast the next day, but then she meets the girls in a restaurant. They finally learn why Jodie left the Bad Girls house one week earlier at the end of the season. Leslie and Aimee once again become annoyed by Zara who quickly forms a connection with Jodie. Before leaving Baltimore, Zara and Jodie had gone to a strip club.
4	"The Liberty Bowel"	July 10, 2007
The girls leave Jodie and head to Aimee's hometown, Philadelphia. After being lost, the girls become bored with the town and settle in a restaurant. Aimee decided to tell about her town making a tour of her town, but Leslie cannot concentrate because she suddenly comes down with diarrhea. The girls meet Aimee's relatives shortly after, but Leslie's sickness prompts the girls to leave pretty soon. At the end of the day they host a broadcasting event and meet the fans.
5	"Rural Fixation"	July 17, 2007
The girls get lost while on their way to Zara's hometown in the upstate of New York. Her town isn't even on the map, which sets Leslie and Aimee in a bad mood, who also didn't expect to see snow. Meanwhile, Joanna and Andrea have shown up elsewhere and they are planning to crash their party and join them on their trip. Zara, Aimee and Leslie arrive to the warm welcome of Zara's relatives. They have fun riding snowy slopes, and Leslie becomes quite satisfied. They head to meet Zara's friends, where Joanna and Andrea suddenly appear. Leslie quickly gets fed up with their behavior. The next day all five girls go to Boston. The original three girls don't like their guests and throw their belongings out of the car and leave when Joanna and Andrea went to a restroom.
6	"Hair Today, Gone Tomorrow"	July 24, 2007
The girls make their last stop on the trip to Boston. They meet up with former housemate Ripsi, who was the first to go home after only three days in the Bad Girls house. With their first night in Boston, Zara and Ripsi become involved in a huge bar brawl. Ripsi goes from being Zara's best friend to disliking her, because Aimee has exposed her lies. While at a fan-meeting event, Joanna and Andrea show up once again, and Zara goes to party with them. The other girls find Joanna's behavior to be atrocious. Both Zara and Joanna end up in a restroom due to being plastered.
