= Andrea Laing =

American actress

- Born: Jamaica
- Education: High Point University (BA)
- Occupations: Actor; Host; Voice actor
- Years active: 2007–present

Andrea Laing is a Jamaican-American film and theater actress. She is best known for her role as Zoe in Adult Swim Yule Log and its sequel Adult Swim Yule Log 2: Branchin' Out, and Erika in the Paramount + series The Game, and Ellen in Pain Hustlers. She was also the face of Delta Air Lines' 2022 promotional campaign.

== Early life ==
Laing was born in Jamaica and spent her childhood in both Jamaica and High Point, North Carolina, where she attended a private Catholic school, Immaculate Heart of Mary. Her parents, both Jamaican immigrants, worked a lot, leaving her to entertain herself by singing and dancing to her stuffed animals, which she credits for her later interest in acting and entertaining. Laing described her parents and Catholic school upbringing as strict, and also credits growing up in both Jamaica and North Carolina with providing her with a wide exposure and empathy to different communities' stories, which she applied later to her acting career.

She later attended High Point University, graduating in 2006 with a bachelor degree in broadcast journalism with a double minor in criminal justice and sociology.

== Acting career ==
Laing appeared as a mid-season replacement in the first season of the Oxygen Network reality television show Bad Girls Club in 2007 and in two episodes in the series spin-off Bad Girls Road Trip. She appeared as a featured extra in the horror film Chainsaw Cheerleaders in 2008, and had roles in television shows such as Teen Wolf, with her first recurring role in the 2013 television series Stuff You Should Know. In 2014, she moved to Atlanta and worked as a temp at CNN and Turner Broadcasting for two years. During that time, she sought something more fulfilling and a friend introduced her to production assistant work and she continued to pursue hosting and acting on camera. Laing also gained experience doing sketch comedy and stand-up, performing in Atlanta venues like the Limelight Theater (formerly Village Theatre), Sketchworks Comedy, and Dad's Garage Theatre Company.

In 2015, Laing won a hosting position in an NBC competition, and was selected as a red carpet host at the American Black Film Festival. With more experience, she opted to sign on with a talent agency and take classes to further her acting career. She continued to accumulate credits in films and television series, including NCIS: New Orleans, Atlanta, Dopesick, and the 2021 Barry Jenkins miniseries The Underground Railroad. Laing described her work on The Underground Railroad as Henrietta as some of the "most beautiful and yet challenging roles" she had taken on, noting a positive experience with series creator Jenkins and the difficult subject matter.

In 2022, Laing starred in the Adult Swim meta-horror comedy film Adult Swim Yule Log written and directed by Casper Kelly. The film, about a cursed and murderous yule log that terrorizes weekend cabin renters, was a viral hit, with particular attention paid to Laing's breakout performance as the lead character, Zoe. Laing would later reprise the role in the film's 2024 sequel Adult Swim Yule Log 2: Branchin' Out to positive reviews. She appeared in another recurring role as Erika in two seasons of the Paramount+ comedy-drama series The Game, and had a stand out role as Ellen in the David Yates film Pain Hustlers alongside stars Emily Blunt, Chris Evans, and Catherine O'Hara.

Laing became the face of Delta Air Lines' 2022 promotional campaign, appearing in ads depicting her traveling through Argentina, including through Buenos Aires, Patagonia, and the Pampas, with voice over by Viola Davis. Laing spent two months shooting the campaign in Argentina.

In 2023, Laing starred onstage in the lead role of Sandey in the award-winning parody musical Vape The Musical at the Aurora Theatre in Berkeley, California.

== Voice acting ==
Laing has also done work as an audio book narrator. Her work on the audio book of the young adult novel A Song Below Water by Bethany C. Morrow was nominated as a finalist for the 2021 Audie Awards held by the Audio Publishers Association.

== Personal life ==
Laing is based in Atlanta, Georgia and spends part of her time in Buckhead.

Laing has also described her love of fitness and wellness. She describes herself as a globetrotter with a passion for international travel, and her exposure through the Delta campaign cast her as a travel guru, with various publications seeking her advice on travel essentials and destination recommendations.

Laing is also involved with philanthropic organizations in Atlanta, working with the Atlanta branches of the Humane Society, Boys & Girls Clubs of America, and American Red Cross.

== Filmography ==
=== Film ===
Year	Title	Role	Notes
2008	Chainsaw Cheerleaders	Nightclub Girl	
2012	Shrink Rap	Girl at coffee shop	TV Movie
2013	Zombie College: The 5 Rules of Lab Safety	Amy	Short Film
2013	Greg's Got Doritos	HotFace Johnson	Short Film
2013	Central Point	Ad Girl	Short Film
2014	Breathe	Officer Dawn	
2015	Things Actors Should Never Say or Do in Auditions Vol. 2	Sara Smith	Short Film
2015	Mr. Lockjaw	Partier	
2015	American Dirtbags	Alaina	
2015	A Christmas to Remember	Alicia	
2015	Key Road	Mika	
2017	Art Appreciation	Brewster	Short Film
2017	M.A.F.I.A.	Beth	Short Film
2017	Curl Up & Dye	Queenie	Short Film
2017	Pitch Perfect 3	Female Jumper	Uncredited
2018	Silencer	Campaign Volunteer	Short Film
2018	You Wanna Pizza Me?	Susan	Short Film
2019	PhotoBomb	Nat	Short Film
2019	Richard Jewell	911 Operator No. 2	
2020	Support	Kylie	Short Film
2020	Body and Son	Andrea	Short Film
2021	Lake Forest Road	Emilia	Short Film
2022	AWOL	Michelle	Short Film
2022	Honk for Jesus. Save Your Soul	Anita	
2022	Terminal	Rebecca	Short Film
2022	B Positive	Dr. Murdock	
2022	Room 321	Gail	Short Film
2022	Fantasy Football	Reporter No. 4	
2022	Adult Swim Yule Log	Zoe	TV Movie
2023	How to Ruin the Holidays	Instructors	
2023	Strays	Jenna's Friend	
2023	Pain Hustlers	Ellen	
2024	Christmas with Jerks	Director Andrea	
2024	Baby Bird	Beth	
2024	Kemba	Newscaster	
2024	Adult Swim Yule Log 2: Branchin' Out	Zoe	TV Movie
2024	_PREVIEW_	Malaya	Short Film
2025	Merv	Dr. Judy Bankert	

=== Television ===
Year	Title	Role	Notes
2006	Bad Girls Club	self	7 episodes
2007	Bad Girls Road Trip	self	2 episodes
2011	The Harry Strange Radio Drama	IVY, Evelyn	
2012	Teen Wolf	Kara Simmons	Episode: "Raving"
2013	Stuff You Should Know	Kimberly	7 episodes
2014	Staying in Lane	Kid's Mom	
2014	Survivor's Remorse	Club Girl	Episode: "The Decisions"
2015	The Haves and the Have Nots	Laura	Episode: "Vetted"
2015	Finding Carter	Cool Chick	Episode: "She's Come Undone"
2016	The Vampire Diaries	EMT	Episode: "Gods and Monsters"
2016	RePlay	Debbie	2 episodes
2017	The Inspectors	Madison Bagley	Episode: "Wedding Bell Blues"
2018	Step Up: High Water	Estelle	3 episodes
2018	Two Roads	Becca	Episode: "Pilot"
2018	Dynasty	Press No. 1	Twenty-Three Skidoo
2019	The Resident	Transplant Coordinator Vanessa Luling	2 episodes
2019	Greenleaf	Vida	Episode: "Reunited"
2020	Brockmire	Bernice	Episode: "The Long Offseason"
2020	NCIS: New Orleans	Alyssa Martin	Episode: "Chapter 2: South Carolina"
2021	The Underground Railroad	Henrietta	2 episodes
2021	Our Kind of People	Alita	Episode: "My Mother, Myself"
2021	Legacies	Brandy	Episode: "I Thought You'd Be Happier to See Me"
2021	Dopesick	TV Reporter	Episode: "The People vs. Purdue Pharma"
2021	Swagger	Dr. Wallace	2 episodes
2022	Killing It	Sandra Stevens	Episode: "The Kingmaker"
2022	Atlanta	Shannon	Episode: "The Most Atlanta"
2022	Cherish the Day	Woman	Episode: "That Make You Mine"
2022	Echo 3	Bridesmaid No. 4	2 episodes
2022–2023	The Game	Erika	6 episodes
2023	True Lies	Cherry	Episode: "Pilot"
2024	Big Bad Dungeon – Firevalanche	Brandy	Episode: "Episode 1"
2024	Reasonable Doubt	Carlata	Episode: "Say Hello"
2025	Grosse Pointe Garden Society	Susie	Episode: "The Cup"
2025	Other Things		Episode: "Black; An Intensive"

=== Podcasts ===
Year	Title	Role	Notes
2020	13 Days of Halloween	Anney	Episode: "The Garden"

=== Audiobooks ===
Year	Title	Role	Author
2019	The Revolution of Birdie Randolph	Narrator	Brandy Colbert
2021	Poetic Justice	Narrator	Andrea J. Johnson
2021	A Song Below Water	Narrator	Bethany C. Morrow

== Stage ==
Year	Title	Role	Notes
2023	Vape The Musical	Sandy	Aurora Theatre

== Awards and nominations ==
Year	Award	Category	Nominated work	Result
2021	Audie Awards	Young Adult Finalists	A Song Below Water	Nominated
