= Foodies (web series) =

Foodies is a satirical web television series written and directed by Japhy Grant. The first episode appeared on March 9, 2011.

== Plot ==
The series revolves around a weekly dinner club which, with the exception of Porter (Sean Hankinson), is very new to the food world. Complicating matters is the fact that not only is Porter's fiancée, Moose (Carlee Avers), in the dining club, but also her old flame, the bombastic and culinarily talented Danny Domenica (Daniel Franzese). While on the surface it may appear to be a straightforward sitcom, John Sheehan of the Seattle Weekly praises the show for "doing something to deflate the egos and take a hammer to the pretensions of the foodie microcosm".

== Development ==
Within a 60-day period, Grant's pitch for Foodies was selected to be part of the New York University alumni script showcase, three episodes were written, pre-production, principal photography and post-production were all completed.

== Cast ==
Porter - Sean Hankinson
Danny Domenica - Daniel Franzese
Moose - Carlee Avers
Tom - Jeffery Self
Iliza - Anne Lane
Chloe - Drew Droege
