= Daniel Franzese =

American actor (born 1978)

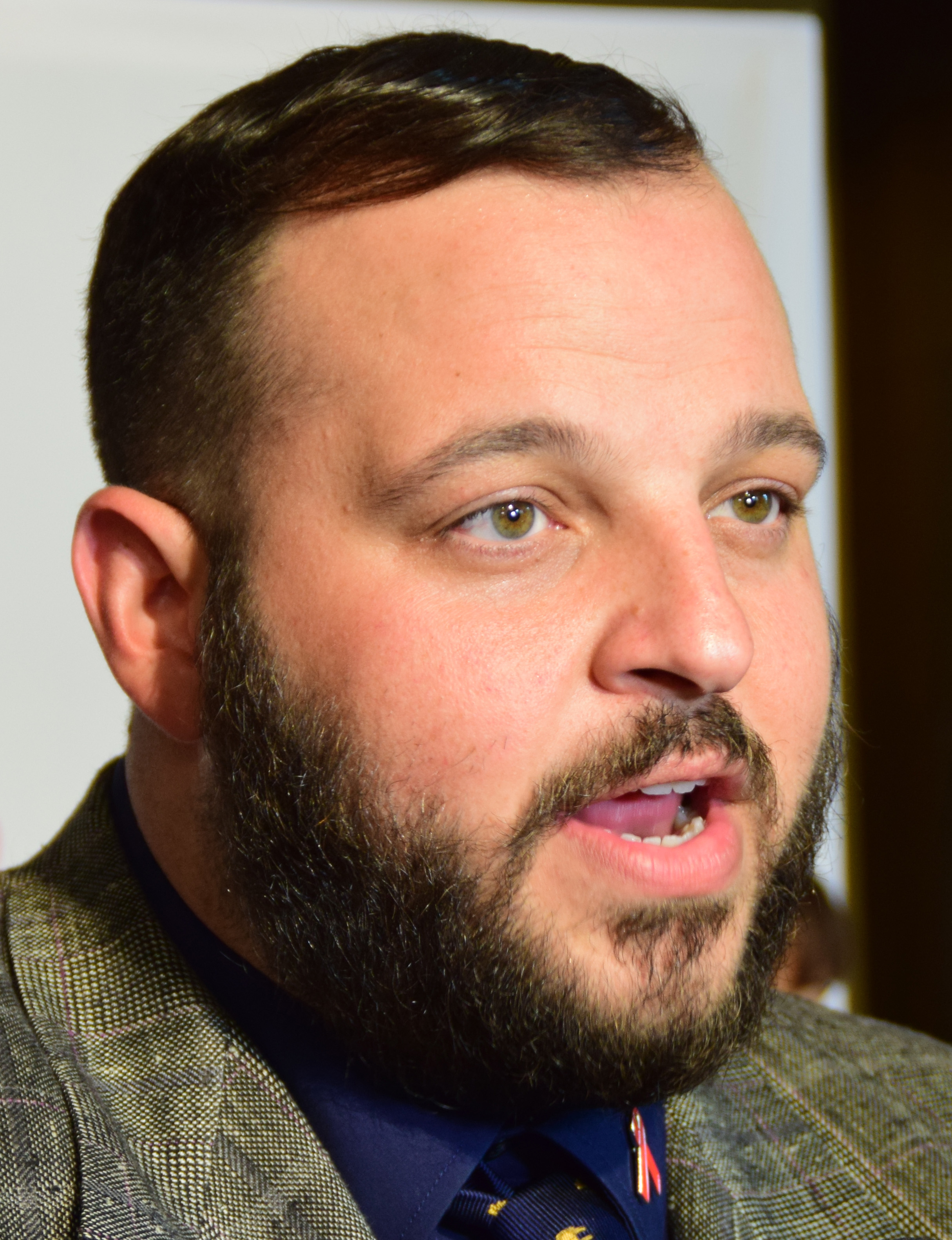
- Franzese in 2015
- Born: May 9, 1978 (age 48); New York City, U.S.
- Occupations: Actor; comedian; activist
- Years active: 2001–present

Daniel Franzese (born May 9, 1978) is an American actor best known for his roles in the films Bully and Mean Girls. Franzese is the creator of several live comedy shows, including the 2011 rock opera Jersey Shoresical: A Frickin' Rock Opera! and his one-man stand-up performance I've Never Really Made the Kind of Money to Become a Mess in 2013.

After coming out as gay in 2014, Franzese became more active in the fight for civil and human rights in the LGBTQ community; and through his portrayal of the HIV-positive character Eddie in the second season of the HBO series Looking, and its subsequent series finale television film, Looking: The Movie, he has become a well known AIDS activist in the United States. In 2020, Franzese began hosting a weekly comedy and faith podcast, Yass, Jesus! with former Trinity Broadcasting Network host Azariah Southworth.

== Early life ==
Franzese was born in Bensonhurst, Brooklyn, New York and raised in Fort Lauderdale, Florida, the son of Denise, a cafeteria worker, and Ralph "R. J." Franzese, a lounge singer. Franzese attended Piper High School in Sunrise, Florida from 1992 to 1996. After high school, he attended Florida School of the Arts in Palatka, Florida. He is of Italian descent.

== Career acting ==
Franzese portrayed high school student Damian Leigh in the teen comedy film Mean Girls (2004). Mean Girls grossed $130.1 million worldwide and has become a cult classic. In 2018, he was set to reprise his role as Damian in Ariana Grande's music video for the song "Thank U, Next", but had to drop out due to scheduling conflicts. He was doing a comedy tour at the time.

He has appeared in numerous feature films, including Bully, Party Monster, Bristol Boys and War of the Worlds. He has also guest starred on several television series, including The Comeback, CSI: Crime Scene Investigation, Burn Notice, Party Down, and the web series Foodies. He had a main role in the 2010 film I Spit on Your Grave.

In 2015, he was cast as Eddie in HBO's comedy-drama television series Looking; and in 2016, he landed the main role of Vern Testaverde in ABC Family's teen drama series Recovery Road. In 2016 and early 2017, he portrayed Jackson Morrison in ABC's legal drama series Conviction. In November 2023, he appeared in a Mean Girls-themed Black Friday commercial for Walmart alongside his original Mean Girls co-stars Lindsay Lohan, Lacey Chabert, Amanda Seyfried and Rajiv Surendra. He portrayed his original Mean Girls character Damian Leigh in a second commercial for Walmart titled "Cady's Wednesday", released on November 15, 2023.

=== Comedy ===
Franzese has written, directed and performed several live comedy productions, including his one-man Off-Broadway show, I've Never Really Made the Kind of Money to Become a Mess, which premiered in New York in 2013 at The Players Theater, and his 2011 rock opera Jersey Shoresical: A Frickin Rock Opera!, which also premiered in New York at The Fringe Festival before its run in Los Angeles at the Hayworth Theatre. Franzese is also an emerging stand-up comedian, and has performed on stages across America at clubs like Stand Up Live in Phoenix and the Comedy Store in Hollywood.

Franzese has been a guest panelist on the Logo TV comedy game show Gay for Play Starring RuPaul and was the host of Gay Skit Happens, a comedy sketch show, also on Logo TV.

Franzese's stand-up comedy tour, Yass You're Amazing! And podcast, Yass Jesus! a way to look into Christianity through the LGBTQ community, found success at colleges, clubs and theaters. He has also headlined The Burbank Comedy Festival, The Ruby LA Queer Comedy Festival. In 2019, Franzese performed his hit New York comedy show Danny Franzese and The House Of Glen Coco at SF Sketchfest featuring his pick of the best and brightest in queer comedy.

== Personal life ==
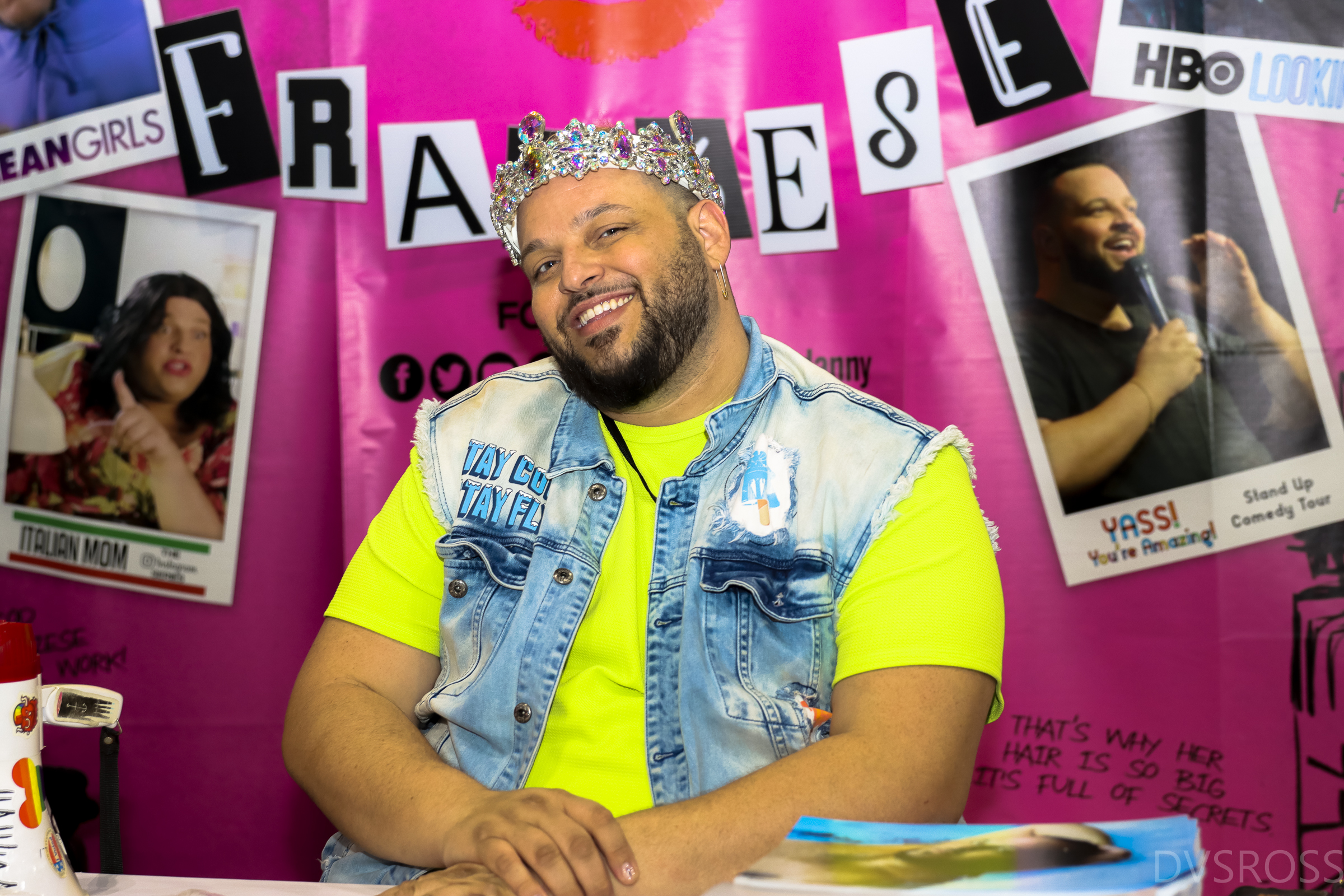
Franzese at RuPaul's DragCon in Los Angeles in 2022

In 2016, Franzese proposed to his boyfriend of two years, stylist Joseph Bradley Phillips, at a Starbucks in North Hollywood, California. They called off their engagement in July 2018.

=== Activism ===
After penning a coming out letter to his Mean Girls character Damian in 2014, in which the actor spoke of his admiration for the courage Damian displayed as an openly gay teenager and referring to him as an icon for gay youth, Franzese became an influential voice in the LGBTQ community. When he became an official ambassador for the Elizabeth Taylor AIDS Foundation, organizations such as GLAAD invited Franzese to host their 2015 gala in San Francisco. He also presented the GLAAD playbook on HIV and AIDS to MSNBC on behalf of the organization. His reputation as an activist grew after he was awarded the role of Eddie, an HIV-positive activist for a non-profit organization, in the HBO series Looking. During his time on the series, Franzese used his celebrity to promote messages of acceptance and understanding for people living with HIV at special events, through media appearances, and a speeches at college campuses, including the University of Wisconsin in April 2016.

Franzese is also an ambassador for LAMBDA Legal, which is dedicated to decreasing the stigma associated with people living with HIV, and changing current HIV-related laws.

In September 2019, Franzese was an ambassador and the host for the AIDS Walk Atlanta & 5K Run, a fundraising and awareness campaign that raises funds to help prevent the spread of HIV/AIDS and to provide critical social services and healthcare for people living with HIV. He was also the captain of his team for the event: Team Glen Coco.

In addition to his advocacy on behalf of HIV patients, on March 22, 2019, Franzese partnered with Lonely Whale and Bacardi in their efforts to stop pollution of the oceans with discarded plastic. They generated #thefuturedoesntsuck campaign to persuade the Unicode Consortium to remove all single-use plastic straws, which endanger marine wildlife, from drink icons in its emoji catalog.

== Filmography ==
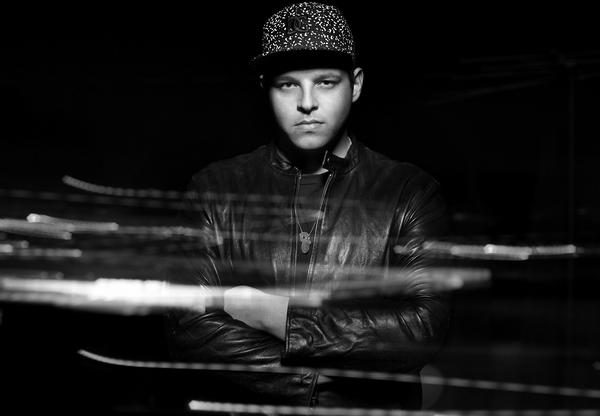
"Daniel Franzese in Lights" Photo by Tommy Agriodimas

Film and television
Year	Title	Role	Notes
2001	Bully	Derek Dzvirko	
2002	Hometown Legend	Abel	
2002	Blood Feast 2: All U Can Eat	Altar Boy	
2003	Party Monster	The Rat / Dallas MC	
2003	Queens Supreme	David	Episode: "Pilot"
2004	Mean Girls	Damian Leigh	
2004	Stateside	Danny Tripodi	
2004	Soleado	Bar Friend	
2005	War of the Worlds	National Guardsman	
2005	The Comeback	Mr. Hollywood	Episode: "Valerie Relaxes in Palm Springs"
2005	Cruel World	Claude Markham	
2005	Bristol Boys	Jake	
2006	CSI: Crime Scene Investigation	Dean Harden	Episode: "Fannysmackin'"
2006	Whirlygirl	Big Clive	
2006	The Iron Man	Valeah	
2008	Bar Starz	Big Mikey	
2008	Killer Pad	Doug	
2009	The Missing Person	Agent Craig	
2009	On the Inside	Paul Warren	
2009	Kill Theory	Freddy	
2010	Party Down	Ziggy Chorofsky	Episode: "Cole Landry's Draft Day Party"
2010	I Spit on Your Grave	Stanley Woods	
2010	Burn Notice	Dougie	Episode: "Noble Causes"
2011	Foodies	Danny Domenica	
2012	Electric City		
2012	Foodfight!	Twinkleton (voice)	
2015	Looking	Eddie	Series regular (season 2), 8 episodes
2015	Mind Puppets		
2016	Recovery Road	Vern Testaverde	10 episodes
2016	Looking: The Movie	Eddie	Television film
2016–2017	Conviction	Jackson Morrison	7 episodes
2018	The Con Is On		
2020	RuPaul's Drag Race	Himself	Guest Judge, Episode: "Snatch Game"
2022	RuPaul's Secret Celebrity Drag Race	Donna Bellissima	Season 2
2024	Beat the Bridge	Himself	Season 1
2026	Stop! That! Train!	Disheveled Man	

Commercials
Year	Title	Brand	Role
2023	Walmart Black Friday Deals: Jingle Bell Rockin'	Walmart	Damian Leigh
2023	Walmart Black Friday Deals: Cady's Wednesday	Walmart	Damian Leigh
2023	Walmart Black Friday Deals: Karen's Wednesday	Walmart	Damian Leigh
