= Azariah Southworth =

American writer (born 1986)

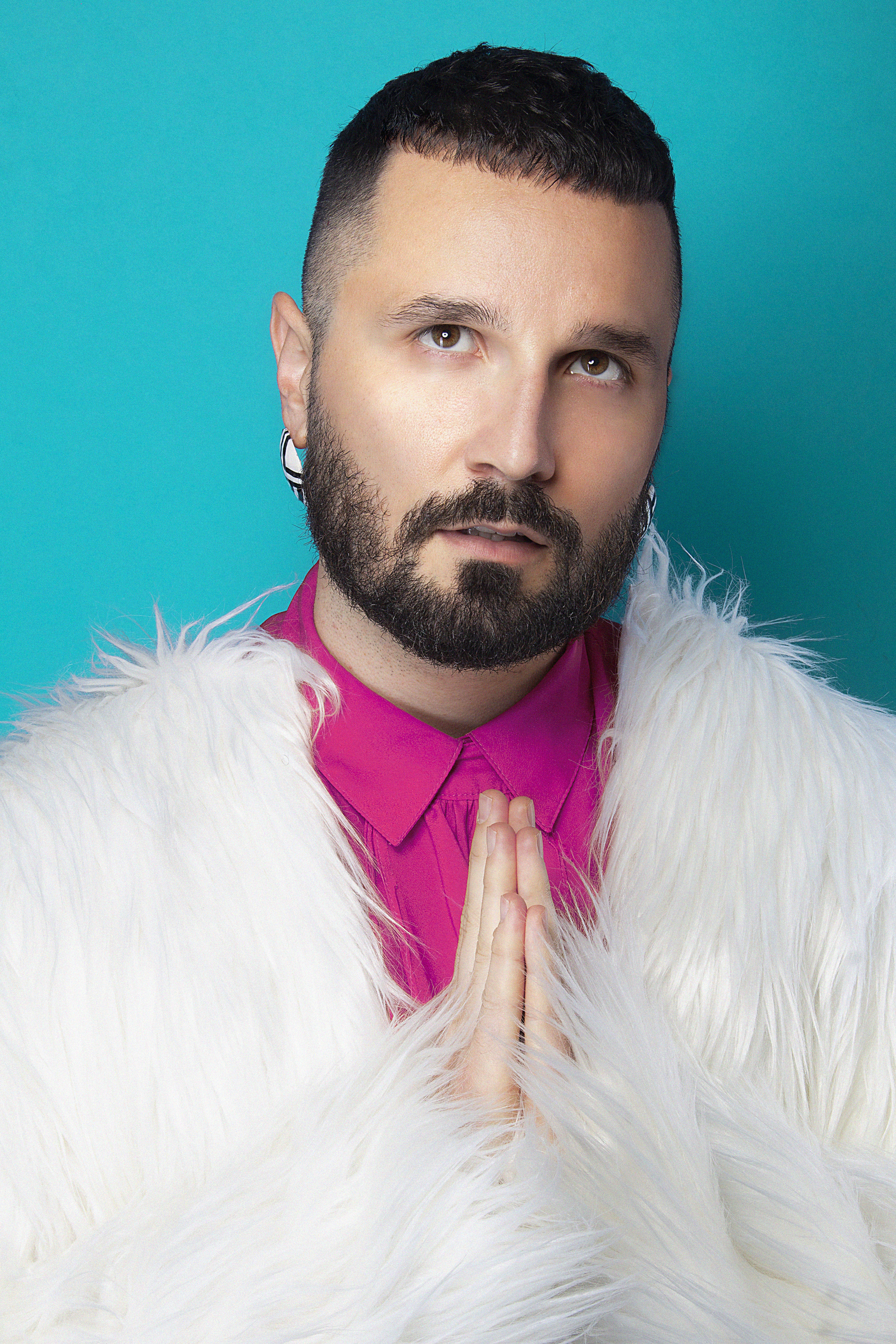
- Southworth in 2021
- Born: May 13, 1986 (age 40); United States
- Education: Indiana-Purdue University of Fort Wayne & University of Nevada, Las Vegas
- Website: www.azariahspeaks.com

Azariah Southworth (born May 13, 1986) is an American writer and former television presenter of The Remix, a syndicated reality show on the NRB, TBN, JCTV, and VTN networks. The Remix featured Christian artists such as Jars of Clay, Rachael Lampa, Shane & Shane and watched by more than 200,000 viewers a week.

Raised in Orland, Indiana, Southworth currently resides in Los Angeles. He announced he is gay on Wednesday, April 16, 2008, stating, "This has been a long time coming. I’m in a place where I’m at peace with my faith, friends, family and more importantly myself. I know this will end my career in Christian television, but I must now live my life openly and honestly with everyone. This is my reason for doing this." The story was covered by The Huffington Post, PerezHilton.com, The Advocate, and Fox News Channel.

After coming out, Southworth was named one of Instinct's "Leading Men of 2008". Southworth has advocated for LGBT rights with the Soulforce Q "2008 Equality Ride". In 2010, Southworth was the opening act for gay Christian singer Ray Boltz on his "Living True: The Tour". In 2020, Audity launched Yass, Jesus!, an LGBTQ and faith affirming podcast, with Southworth and actor Daniel Franzese as the hosts. The show aims to help others see the queer and trans narratives in the Bible through storytelling and comedy. Yass, Jesus! is produced by Ross Murray and Meredith Paulley.

== Federal indictment and arrest ==
In September 2026, Southworth was arrested by the FBI at his apartment in the Westlake neighborhood of Los Angeles after being indicted by a federal grand jury in the United States District Court for the Central District of California. He was charged in a three-count indictment with threatening the president (18 U.S.C. § 871), cyberstalking (18 U.S.C. § 2261A), and making harassing telephone calls in interstate communications (47 U.S.C. § 223).

Prosecutors alleged that Southworth posted videos and statements across TikTok, YouTube, and Instagram calling for the assassination of Donald Trump and published the home address and personal contact information of attorney Jay Sekulow, accompanied by harassing voicemails sent to Sekulow's family. If convicted on all counts, he faces a statutory maximum sentence of up to 12 years in federal prison.

== See also ==
- Christianity and homosexuality
- List of people from Nashville, Tennessee
