= Bad Girls Club season 1 =

Bad Girls Club
- Season 1
- The original seven "bad girls" of season one: Kerry, Zara, Jodie, Aimee, Ty, Leslie, and Ripsi (from left to right)
- No. of episodes: 22

Release
- Original network: Oxygen
- Original release: December 5, 2006 – June 5, 2007

Season chronology
- Next → Season 2

The first season of the Bad Girls Club debuted on December 5, 2006, and concluded on April 24, 2007, followed by two specials. Production of the season began in June 2006, and was located in Los Angeles, California.

== Cast ==
The season began with seven original bad girls, of which one left voluntarily and two were removed by production. Three replacement bad girls were introduced in their absences later in the season.

List of bad girls
Name	Age (Note: Age at time of filming)	Hometown	Replaced
Aimee Landi	24	South Philadelphia, Pennsylvania	—N/a
Hripsime “Ripsi” Terzian	23	Watertown, Massachusetts	—N/a
Jodie Howell	29	Columbia, Maryland	—N/a
Kerry Harvick	31	Nashville, Tennessee	—N/a
Leslie Ramsue	24	Atlanta, Georgia	—N/a
Tyla “Ty” Colliers	25	Alpharetta, Georgia	—N/a
Zara Sprankle	22	Cicero, New York	—N/a
DeAnn Witt	24	McKinney, Texas	Ripsi
Joanna Hernandez	23	Sacramento, California	Ty
Andrea Laing	26	High Point, North Carolina	Leslie

=== Duration of Cast ===
Bad Girl	Episodes																				
Bad Girl	1	2	3	4	5	6	7	8	9	10	11	12	13	14	15	16	17	18	19	20	21
Aimee	Featured																				
Kerry	Featured																				
Zara	Featured																				
DeAnn					Entered (Note: DeAnn replaced Hripsime.)	Featured															
Andrea																Entered (Note: Andrea and Joanna replaced Leslie and Tyla.)	Featured				
Joanna																Entered	Featured				
Jodie	Featured																		Left (Note: Jodie voluntarily left the house after a heated argument with Kerry.)		
Leslie	Featured													Left (Note: Leslie voluntarily left the house after feeling like no one was doing anything to change.)							
Tyla	Featured								removed (Note: Tyla was removed from the house after physically attacking Aimee.)												
Hripsime	Featured		removed (Note: Hripsime was removed from the house after physically attacking Jodie and Kerry.)																		

== Episodes ==
No. overall	No. in season	Title	Original release date	Prod. code
1	1	"It's Easier to Be Bad"	December 5, 2006	101
Seven women, settle into their new house and start to get to know each other. A night out at a club turns to the worse for Leslie when a fight breaks out between her and a security guard. Meanwhile, the other girls discover Jodie's carelessness for not sticking up for Leslie.
2	2	"A Rude Awakening"	December 12, 2006	102
After a night of fun yoga, Ripsi starts to attack Kerry.
3	3	"Quick Fix"	December 19, 2006	103
The episode continues with Ripsi attacking Kerry and Jodie. Kerry's boyfriend comes to visit. Ripsi is eventually sent home. Note: Ripsi is removed from the house.
4	4	"A Tomik Bomb"	January 2, 2007	104
Zara gets on the girls bad side, and seems to completely disregard her boyfriend's feelings as she pursues Tomik. Kerry and Jodie become closer, and room together.
5	5	"Out With the Old, in With the New"	January 9, 2007	105
A new roommate arrives and makes instant friends with everyone except Aimee. Zara continues to hook up with Tomik, even though she has a boyfriend waiting for her back home. Note: DeAnn replaces Ripsi.
6	6	"The Trouble With Boys"	January 16, 2007	106
Arguing between Tomik and Aimee upsets Zara, but what she finds even more troubling is Aimee's claim that Tomik has a wandering eye. Meanwhile, Jodie becomes very interested in a cute guy.
7	7	"Miss Understanding"	January 23, 2007	107
Zara gets on Leslie's bad side after she makes a racially insensitive comment.
8	8	"Not a Happy Camper"	January 30, 2007	108
DeAnn, Kerry, Jodie, and Zara go on a camping excursion. DeAnn and Kerry wanted to pull a prank on Jodie but instead pull one on Aimee. Meanwhile, at the house, Ty confronts her problems with her boyfriend, Juan. Aimee takes the prank a little too personal, and decides to do some damage.
9	9	"Smack My Beach Up"	February 6, 2007	109
Ty and Leslie engage in a boozy night out and return home to a mightily irked Aimee. Later, bad blood boils between Ty and Aimee, who make waves during a beach excursion. Elsewhere, being home alone gives Jodie and Zara an opportunity to lay bare their sexy and silly sides. Note: Ty is removed from the house.
10	10	"And the Walls Come Tomberlin Down"	February 13, 2007	110
After Ty's departure from the house, Leslie is stuck on leaving as well. Meanwhile, Kerry meets up with singer/songwriter Bobby Tomberlin. Kerry feels Jodie stole her spotlight at the meet with Bobby, and is very angry with Jodie.
11	11	"Drop of a Hat"	February 20, 2007	111
Zara seeks revenge against Tomik when his romantic interest in her withers. DeAnn and Pool Boy Steve get really close.
12	12	"She Said, She Said"	February 27, 2007	112
The claws come out when Zara informs Kerry that Aimee has been insulting her, which in turn only makes the feud between Zara and Aimee worst.
13	13	"Holy Ghost"	March 6, 2007	113
Jodie wears sexy lingerie for a photo shoot. DeAnn and Jodie get into it when DeAnn tells Jodie how she feelt about the photo shoot. Meanwhile, things get spooky when the girls believe that the house is haunted.
14	14	"What Are Little Girls Made Of?"	March 13, 2007	114
Leslie seeks to leave the world of exotic dancing; Zara's wild antics disrupt her roommates' lives; Leslie's unsure about her future in the house and ultimately decides to leave. Note: Leslie voluntarily leaves the house.
15	15	"Kiss and Tell"	March 20, 2007	115
Zara confesses her sextracurricular activities to her boyfriend after he makes a surprise visit. Meanwhile, Kerry meets a music producer and a shocking surprise comes the gals' way.
16	16	"Rocky Road"	March 27, 2007	116
Tensions rise between the new and old roommates; Jodie gets a modeling opportunity at a runway show and is determined to show that it isn't necessary to be ultra thin to succeed. Note: Joanna & Andrea replaces both Ty & Leslie.
17	17	"Chicken Scratch"	April 3, 2007	117
After Zara ditches Aimee at the club, and takes part in trashing the house, the other girls in the house become fed up with Zara's behavior.
18	18	"A Little Ditty About Steve and DeAnn"	April 10, 2007	118
Steve ends up kissing another woman following an argument with DeAnn.
19	19	"Lord of the Lies"	April 17, 2007	119
Kerry heads to Nashville, Tennessee, to pursue a music career while the housemates pick on Jodie. Note: Jodie voluntarily leaves the house.
20	20	"Happy Ending"	April 24, 2007	120
Before the roommates attempt to reconcile broken friendships as they anticipate their exit from the house, a flirty Zara rarifies the girls' attempt to stage a charity fund-raising event.
21	21	"Shrink Wrapped: Reunion"	May 1, 2007	121
The original ladies of the season come together back at the house, excluding Jodie, to discuss with Stan Katz, a psychologist regarding their behavior this season. The psychologist's advice isn't something Aimee and Ty agree with. Later, Ripsi asks Kerry for forgiveness.
22	22	"Outrageous & Unseen"	June 5, 2007	122
Aimee, Ty, Zara, Leslie and Ripsi showcase highlights plus unseen footage from the first season. Three of the housemates prepare to leave for the Bad Girls Road Trip.
