= Adult Swim Yule Log =

2022 film by Casper Kelly

- Genre: Black comedy Surreal humor Comedy horror Thriller
- Created by: Casper Kelly
- Written by: Casper Kelly
- Directed by: Casper Kelly
- Starring: Andrea Laing; Justin Miles; Hannah Alline; Sean Hankinson; Danielia Maximillian-Almeda; Skye Passmore; Charles Green; Jessica Fontaine; Michael Reagan; Tordy Clark; Brendan Patrick Connor
- Country of origin: United States
- Original language: English

Production
- Executive producers: Casper Kelly; Walter Newman; Cameron Tang; Melissa Warrenburg
- Producers: Tim Reis; Danya Levine; Matt Foster; Alan Steadman; John Brestan
- Cinematography: Alex Allgood
- Editors: John Brestan; Nick Gibbons; Ned Hastings; Paul Painter; Phil Samson
- Running time: 91 minutes
- Production companies: Media Team; Williams Street; Fried Society

Original release
- Network: Adult Swim
- Release: December 11, 2022

Related
- Too Many Cooks; Adult Swim Yule Log 2: Branchin' Out

Adult Swim Yule Log (also titled The Fireplace) is a surreal black comedy horror film that originally aired as a special on Adult Swim on December 11, 2022. It was created, written, and directed by Casper Kelly, and produced by Williams Street. Created in secret by Kelly, the film initially presents itself as a holiday footage video of a fireplace located inside a vacation cabin, before eventually giving way to a surprise meta-horror plot occurring within the cabin, and involving the fireplace itself. Adult Swim's first horror film, it was met with generally favorable reviews.

A sequel Adult Swim Yule Log 2: Branchin' Out aired on December 6, 2024.

== Plot ==
The film begins as a static shot of a cabin fireplace with burning yule logs accompanied by holiday music. The cabin has a dark history across the ages, including its original occupant: an American slave owner named Isaac, who shamefully admits to his slave, Rosa, that he did not sell Rosa's son William to a kind slave owner as he promised her, but to the cruel and sadistic Mr. Armfield to fetch a better price. Devastated, Rosa screams in despair, yelling that William was their son, and kills him with a knife. She hides the knife in the fireplace and is later lynched at a local hanging tree.

In the present, the owner of the cabin arrives to clean it before the weekend renters arrive. A masked killer, "Pleatherface," and his mother, "Mother," break in, murdering her. Hearing renters Alex and Zoe arrive, they hide inside the cabin. By the fireplace, Alex proposes to Zoe, but they are interrupted by the arrival of the local sheriff, who informs them of a killer on the loose. The sheriff recognizes that the burning fireplace log was taken from the nearby hanging tree. He extinguishes the log, advises them against lighting it again, and departs.

Zoe and Alex argue about her apprehensions about marriage and her mental health struggles. They are interrupted by the arrival of four podcasters—Ben, Beth, Holly, and Henry—who accidentally also booked the cabin and plan to investigate lynchings and alien abductions linked to the cabin. Zoe finds the cabin owner's phone ringing under the couch and, unnerved, she and Alex go pack to leave, while Ben showers, and the others go use the hot tub.

Unnoticed, the log reignites on its own, floats to the shower, and bludgeons Ben to death. Henry, stoned, sees a small man talking to him from within the fireplace. The "Little Man in the Fire" beckons Henry to crawl into the fireplace and into a strange burning room, which contains a magic elevator that can travel through time and space to any fireplace in existence. He transports Henry to his childhood home, where his mother is sleeping and pregnant with him. The man tricks Henry into gruesomely killing her, thereby erasing himself from existence.

Back in the cabin, the renters (now with their friend Hunter, instead of Henry) discover Ben's corpse. The floating log appears, crying out in Rosa's voice, as well as other anguished voices of past cabin occupants, and kills Beth and Hunter. Zoe calls the police seeking help from the sheriff but learns that no such sheriff exists. They are ambushed by Pleatherface and Mother, who are unaware of the log. Pleatherface and Mother bind and sexually assault them. An alien in a UFO arrives and sucks out Mother and Alex's internal organs, killing Mother and leaving Alex near death before Pleatherface decapitates it. The hidden knife drops out of the fireplace. Zoe uses it to free herself and kill Pleatherface.

Before they can flee, Zoe is beckoned by the little man in the fireplace, who offers her the chance to end her anxiety by altering the past so she would never be born. She resists him, wanting to live, and he admonishes her for living in a privileged era. Alex helps her break free of his influence while Holly flees into the forest. Alex and Zoe flee in the car. They drive by the hanging tree, where cultists have gathered. Zoe recognizes the fake sheriff among the cultists and runs him over, driving on until sunrise. When they finally stop, Zoe lovingly accepts Alex's proposal, but the log appears outside their window.

The film freezes, playing on a monitor at an Atlanta advertising agency. Isaac is a graphic designer working on a proposal for the new Armfield Cotton Mill Lofts, and his boss and partner Rosa lovingly suggest they take their son William to a baseball game. As they talk, the office begins to burn, and they shift into their previous identities. Isaac begs Rosa for forgiveness for what he did to their son. Rosa screams and attacks him. As she does, the log, now ridden by the little man, smashes through Zoe and Alex's car window, seemingly killing them both.

== Cast ==
- Andrea Laing as Zoe
- Justin Miles as Alex
- Jessica Fontaine as Rosa
- Michael Reagan as Isaac
- Charles Green as the Little Man in the Fire
- Sean Hankinson as Ben
- Hannah Alline as Beth
- Danielia Maximillian-Almeda as Holly
- Skye Passmore as Henry
- Brendan Patrick Connor as Pleatherface/Arvid
- Tordy Clark as Pleatherface's mother

== Development and production ==
Kelly conceived of the idea in 2021 while watching a yule log video and wondering what would occur if someone's legs appeared out of focus walking across the screen accompanied by dialogue in the background, and whether that would generate curiosity in the viewer. According to Kelly, he was able to pitch the initial concept to Adult Swim directly, given their working history together and was familiar with the system to get it greenlit. Adult Swim also had a slush fund, which allowed Adult Swim executives to approve the project without requiring higher corporate approval. The film was Adult Swim's first feature length project (though Williams Street had previously produced two theatrical films: Aqua Teen Hunger Force Colon Movie Film for Theaters and Mister America), and simultaneously, its first horror film. It was also Kelly's first feature-length endeavor. Kelly shot the film in secret over the course of 15 days in order to ensure its delivery by the holiday season. Filming took place in Atlanta and with local Atlanta actors and film crews. Keeping the project budget relatively low also helped the project avoid scrutiny from higher ups, according to Kelly. Following the merger of Warner Bros. Animation and Adult Swim's parent company, Cartoon Network, Kelly had to deal with post-production delays and the involvement of six additional editors, following the departure of executive Walter Newman, who originally greenlit the project. The entire process was compressed, taking 6 months, with each editor being given a month to work on their section.

Initially, the film was to open with two hours of the fireplace yule log sequence, but a higher profile time slot caused Kelly to cut the segment down to just two minutes before the subsequent home invasion and murder sequence. Post-production special effects work on the flying log were done by Brazilian company NoxusFX, which specializes in digital fire effects. Filming the opening sequence, a single, unbroken 20 minute scene, was challenging. Leads Laing and Miles were only aware of the set up for the scene days before filming and rehearsed repeatedly to get it right. The film's short production time also meant that Kelly was unable to experiment with the scene's set up, and would not be able to rely on cuts or close ups later in post-production.

Kelly described the decision to add thematic concepts exploring American chattel slavery as a risk he wanted to take. After uncovering familial history of slave ownership, he felt he had a personal perspective to explore on the issue, including the dilemma of moral relativism. Speaking on his interest in exploring questions in the sub-plot, Kelly noted his family's generational history in the South, stating, "[T]he million-dollar question is always: Well, here I am, Mister Progressive Guy in this purple state, but what if I was alive 200 years ago? What would my beliefs be? I like to think I would be a good person, but would I be? It's a scary thought. But it's an interesting, important conversation, and I took a real chance."

== Release ==
The film was produced in secret and released with little (and incredibly vague) advertisement on December 11, 2022, following the season six finale of popular Adult Swim show Rick and Morty.

== Home media ==
On November 1, 2024, Dekanalog and Vinegar Syndrome released the film onto Blu-ray with a limited edition lenticular slip-cover.

== Reception ==
Adult Swim Yule Log has an approval rating of 80% on review aggregator website Rotten Tomatoes, based on 5 reviews, and an average rating of 6.5/10. On another aggregator, Metacritic, the film has a weighted average score of 67 out of 100, based on reviews from 4 critics, indicating "generally favorable reviews".

Writing for Bloody Disgusting, Daniel Kurland praised the film, awarding it 4 out of 5 on their review scale, stating, "This stealth feature film functions as a cornucopia of horror genre tropes that plays out like an ultra-stylized Dadaist Cabin in the Woods filtered through Adult Swim sensibilities." He added, "The Fireplace is a fantastic experimental piece of cinema that, against all odds and better judgment, succeeds as a full-length horror film that's akin to Texas Chainsaw Massacre."

Writing for Cinema Blend, Jason Wiese described the film as "innovative", saying that it could potentially be received as "one of best Christmas horror movies". Eric Kohn of IndieWire stated that the film took "ambitious swings", praising the slavery sub-plot and gore in particular. Daniel Trainor of The Messenger included the film in his list of top "Yule Log" videos.

Noel Murray writing for the Los Angeles Times stated, "Kelly tries a bit too much, favoring shock and absurdity over consistency and coherence. But the attempt alone is exciting; and it offers a refreshing alternative for those who prefer their holiday entertainment to be spooky, not sentimental." Similar moderately positive reviews came from IGN and Entertainment Weekly. Matt Donato of IGN wrote, "Casper Kelly psychotically spoofs the strangest of strange horror titles that turn anything into a murderous entity while unraveling deadly severe social commentaries. It's abstract art, theater camp, found footage foolishness, hunt-and-stalk depravity — Adult Swim Yule Log is a whole lot of things but, even with a full 90 minutes, few angles feel fully fleshed out." Entertainment Weekly's Darren Franich gave the film a B+, stating, "In these days of TV uncertainty...there's something oddly comforting about the mindbreaking pranks perpetrated by Adult Swim...Fireplace works just as hard to upend your expectations, even if it doesn't hit Kelly's highest heights."

== Sequel ==
A sequel, Adult Swim Yule Log 2: Branchin' Out was produced in 2024 and released on December 6, 2024. Andrea Laing returns, starring as Zoe, who survived the attack and must navigate the traumatic horror movie experiences she suffered while trying to move on with her life, and finding herself inadvertently trapped within a traditional Christmas romantic comedy.

The film aired on Adult Swim on December 6, 2024, and was also available for streaming on Max on December 7, 2024. Besides Laing, the film features an all new cast, though several actors from the first film reprise their roles in brief cameos.
