= Kerry Kersh =

American country singer (born 1974)

Kerry Nichole Kersh
- Also known as: Kerry Singletary
- Born: Kerry Nichole Harvick; September 10, 1974 (age 52)
- Origin: Comanche, Texas, U.S.
- Genre: Country
- Occupations: Singer, songwriter
- Instrument: Vocals
- Years active: 1993–2007
- Label: Lyric Street
- Spouses: Daryle Singletary (m. 1995) David Kersh (m. 2009)

Kerry Nichole Kersh (née Harvick), also formerly known as Kerry Singletary (born September 10, 1974) is an American country singer, songwriter and reality television star, best known for her appearance on the first season of Oxygen Network's hit show Bad Girls Club.

== Music career ==
At the age of 19, Kersh performed on a local radio show, where she was discovered by Don Light who signed her to a publishing contract with Cal IV Entertainment. In 2002, her first cut as a songwriter was "Til Nothing Comes Between Us" for country singer John Michael Montgomery, which became a top-20 hit.

In 2004, Kersh signed to Lyric Street Records, working with producer Byron Gallimore. In 2004, Kersh released her first single titled "Cowgirls", which was co-written by former Arista Nashville artist, Ryan Tyler, alongside Angelo Petraglia and Hillary Lindsey. Despite the single entering the Billboard country charts, peaking at number 45, Kersh was dropped from the label and her album was not released. In 2005, Kersh released her second single "That's What Your Love Does", which did not chart. In 2007, her third single was released, titled "The Biggest Thing", which also did not chart.

In 2005, Kersh posed in the March issue of FHM magazine, alongside fellow country singers; Catherine Britt, Jamie O'Neal, Jennifer Hanson, Jessi Alexander, Lauren Lucas, Shelly Fairchild and Tift Merritt.

Kersh began dating country singer David Kersh, whom she married in 2009.

== Television career ==
In 2006, Kersh starred in the first season of Oxygen Network's hit reality show, Bad Girls Club. Kersh was an original cast member, appearing in all 21 episodes and the reunion special. She was involved in the infamous "Tipsy Ripsi" scene, in which fellow cast member Hripsime "Ripsi" Terzian physically attacked Kersh several times while intoxicated, ultimately leading to three physical altercations between them. Terzian also got into a physical confrontation with cast member Jodie Howell while she was sleeping, during which she threw furniture around the house.

After feeling unsafe, Kersh and Howell ultimately decided that Terzian should be removed from the show. During the season, Kersh also attempted to revive her music career. Kersh's then boyfriend, now husband, David Kersh appeared on the show as moral support for Kersh. During the episode he visited her, she stated she would not marry him. The two married in 2009. In 2007, Kersh made a guest appearance in an episode of Bad Girls Club spin-off, Bad Girls Road Trip.

In 2021, Kersh and her husband were contestants on HGTV's reality game show, Battle on the Beach, which they won.

== Personal life ==
In 1995, Harvick married Daryle Singletary. In 2009, Kersh married country singer David Kersh in Comanche, Texas. They have two children together, and still maintain residence in Comanche.

As of 2025, Kersh and her husband are now interior designers and realtors.

== Filmography ==
=== Film and television ===
| Year | Title | Role | Notes |
|---|---|---|---|
| 2006 | Bad Girls Club season 1 | Self, original | 22 episodes |
| 2007 | Bad Girls Road Trip | Self, guest | 1 episode |
| 2021 | Battle on the Beach | Self, contestant | Winner, 6 episodes |

=== Music videos ===
| Year | Title | Role | Notes |
|---|---|---|---|
| 2005 | Cowgirls | Artist | Directed by: Trey Fanjoy |
| 2005 | That's What Your Love Does | Artist | |

== Discography ==
=== Singles ===
| Year | Single | Peak positions | Album |
| Year | Single | US Country | Album |
|---|---|---|---|
| 2004 | "Cowgirls" | 45 | Cowgirls (unreleased) |
| 2005 | "That's What Your Love Does" | — | Cowgirls (unreleased) |
| 2007 | "The Biggest Thing" | — | Single only |
"—" denotes releases that did not chart
