= Thomas Bunday =

American serial killer (1948–1983)

- Born: Thomas Richard Bunday; September 28, 1948; Nashville, Tennessee, U.S.
- Died: March 15, 1983 (aged 34); Wilbarger County, Texas, U.S.
- Cause of death: Suicide by motorcycle crash

Details
- Victims: 5–6
- Span of crimes: 1979–1981
- Country: United States
- State: Alaska
- Date apprehended: Committed suicide before apprehension

Thomas Richard Bunday (September 28, 1948 – March 15, 1983) was an American serial killer who, from 1979 to 1981, committed a series of murders of young women and girls in the city of Fairbanks, Alaska. At the time of the killings, Bunday was serving at the Eielson Air Force Base near Fairbanks, and for a long time avoided suspicion. Despite confessing to the crimes, Bunday was not immediately arrested due to a legal mistake and remained at liberty for another eight days until his apparent suicide in a motorcycling collision, during which, for unknown reasons, he did not make any effort to evade justice.

== Early years ==
Thomas Bunday was born on September 28, 1948, in Nashville, Tennessee. He was the younger of two children: His brother, Ralph, was 15 years older. Family life was tense. His father, a World War II veteran, suffered from mental disorders and was aggressive toward his wife and younger son. When his father died in 1963, Thomas refused to attend his funeral and ran away from home for several days.

Although Bunday was unpopular at school, he was a good student and a sociable child who had many friends and acquaintances, which helped develop his positive outlook on life. After graduating from high school in 1966, he married his high school sweetheart and in 1967 joined the United States Air Force, where he achieved the rank of technical sergeant. In the late 1960s and early 1970s, Bunday was serving in Southeast Asia. During this period, his wife gave birth to a son fathered by another man.

Despite this, Bunday continued to live with his wife, who later gave birth to a daughter, but an extramarital child strained their relationship. In the mid-1970s, Bunday was sent to further service at Eielson Base, Alaska. During this period, he began to show signs of emotional burnout and began visiting a psychotherapist.

== Murders ==
The murder series began on August 29, 1979, when Fairbanks resident Glinda Sodemann, 19, went missing. Her decomposed body was found two months later in a gravel pit near the highway, 23 miles south of Fairbanks. On June 13, 1980, 11-year-old Doris Oehring went missing. The brother of the deceased told police that a few days before his sister disappeared, he saw her talking to a stranger sitting in a blue car and wearing an Air Force uniform. The brother then helped the investigator make a complete identikit of the criminal.

On January 31, 1981, 20-year-old Marlene Peters went missing, who on the day of her disappearance intended to hitchhike from Fairbanks to Anchorage. Five weeks later, Wendy Wilson, 16, disappeared on her way to the Olps’ house to see her boyfriend who was staying there. Mrs. Olp had offered Wendy a ride before she had disappeared. On May 16, 1981, 18-year-old Lori King disappeared. Shortly before King’s disappearance, Marlene Peters's partially decomposed body was found. In October 1981, not far from Wilson's body, the decomposed body of King was found near the Eielson Air Base. During the investigation, the police for the first time suggested that a serial killer from among the military personnel was operating in the territory.

== Discovery ==
During the investigation, the police inspected all personnel of Eielson Air Base, including the employees employed as civilian specialists. By February 3, 1982, only three people were on the suspect list and one of them was Bunday. All were notable for their violent behavior toward women. By that time, he had been transferred to Wichita Falls, Texas, where he had served since September 1981.

Thomas Bunday was arrested on March 7, 1983, and was taken to the police station to be interrogated. In addition to an interrogation, a search was conducted in his house and the trunk of his car. During the search, evidence was found linking Bunday with the murders in Fairbanks. Upon learning of this, Bunday on the same day admitted to killing five women and girls and described in detail the murders and the circumstances in which they occurred.

He was also questioned about the murder of Cassandra Goodwin on March 22, but vehemently denied committing it. Bunday indicated psychological problems and sexual complexes as a motive for committing the murders. Despite his confession, he was not arrested and had to be released because there was no warrant for his arrest.

== Death ==
Alaskan authorities issued an arrest warrant for Thomas Bunday on March 15, 1983, but he was not immediately arrested in Texas. Riding his motorcycle about 40 miles outside Wichita Falls, Texas, Bunday turned into the oncoming lane of the highway and collided head on with a truck. He died almost instantly. The incident was subsequently recognized as a suicide.

== See also ==
- List of serial killers in the United States
