= Sean Hankinson =

American actor

- Born: Tucson, Arizona, US
- Education: Chapman University (BFA)
- Occupations: Actor; Voice actor
- Years active: 2005–present

Sean Hankinson is an American film and theater actor. He is best known for his role as Ethan Blaire in Days of Our Lives, Ken in Barbie: Life in the Dreamhouse, and Ben in Adult Swim Yule Log.

== Early life ==
Hankinson was born and raised in Tucson, Arizona, living briefly in Albuquerque, New Mexico, before moving to Los Angeles, California. He attended Tucson High Magnet School, a performing arts public school. Hankinson said he had wanted to be an actor since age 6 and began working professionally at age 14.

During college, Hankinson portrayed Alan Strang in the Chapman University production of Equus, for which he won an OC Weekly Theater Award for Best College Performance. His performance was described as "brave" and "near-perfect" by OC Weekly, which further stated that his "sheer acting skill drew the viewer into the character beneath the skin." In a review, The Los Angeles Times described Hankinson's portrayal of Strang as "mercurial" and "both intricate and thorough."

== Acting career ==
After receiving his Bachelor of Fine Arts, Hankison moved to New York City, and began acting in a variety of films and television shows, including a starring role as the character Ben on the long-running web series Prom Queen produced by Michael Eisner for Vuguru and The CW. He also performed in the soap opera Days of Our Lives as Ethan Blaine in 2008.

Throughout the 2010s, he also worked as a voice actor, including voicing the character Ken in the official Mattel comedy web series Barbie: Life in the Dreamhouse from 2012 to 2015. The series experienced renewed popularity on Netflix in 2023 following the release of Greta Gerwig's Barbie that year. Hankinson described the role as a "dream job" and one of his favorites.

During 2016, Hankinson apprenticed at an Off-Broadway theater, and later in 2017 starred in the Off-Broadway touring production of Matt Murphy's Sex Tips for Straight Women from a Gay Man, based on the cult classic best-selling book by Dan Anderson and Maggie Berman of the same name. The production received mixed reviews, though Hankinson received praise for his improvisational skills.

He later relocated to Atlanta in 2019, and landed guest roles in shows like Dynasty and Naomi, as well as a starring role in the 2022 surreal meta-horror comedy Adult Swim Yule Log. He portrayed blacklisted Hollywood screenwriter Dalton Trumbo in the 2024 biographical historical drama Reagan about U.S. president Ronald Reagan.

== Personal life ==
Hankinson is openly gay.

== Filmography ==
=== Film ===
Year	Title	Role	Notes
2005	3 Girls and the Golden Cocoon	Kyle	
2006	The Road Ahead	Joe	
2007	Cougar Club	CC Member	
2007	Fun on Earth	Cafeteria heckler	Short Film
2007	Curtain Call	Mike	Short Film
2009	Drama Kings	Brody Bondalillo	
2011	Bad Actress	Forensics Coordinator	
2013	RockBarnes: The Emperor in You	Simon Foster #1 Fan	
2015	4th Man Out	Derek	
2016	Stu	Bartender	Short Film
2019	Camp Wedding	Gore	
2019	Enjoy the Day	Brandon	Short Film
2020	The Glorias	TV Producer	
2021	21st & Colonial	Ben	Short Film
2022	Gigi & Nate	Dr. Patidar	
2022	Stalked Within	Supervisor	
2022	Adult Swim Yule Log	Ben	
2023	The Slumber Party	Dr. Patrick Brookman	
2024	Megalopolis	TV Newscaster	
2024	Reagan	Dalton Trumbo	

=== Television ===
Year	Title	Role	Notes
2006	Team Extreme	Staggering Kid	TV movie
2006	Untold Stories of the E.R.	Brett Maxwell	Episode: "Too Close to Home"
2007–12	Prom Queen	Ben	Web Series; 51 episodes
2008	Days of Our Lives	Ethan Blaine	3 episodes
2008	Mystery ER	Brandon	Episode: "Rash Decision/Inflamed"
2008	Lost Tapes	Evan Metcalf-Chambers	Episode: "Megaconda"
2011	Foodies	Porter	3 episodes
2011	90210	Polo Shirt Guy	Episode: "Let the Games Begin"
2011	Digimon Fusion Battles	Kenny	
2012	Dates from Hell	Boris	Episode: "A Kiss Before Dying"
2012–15	Barbie: Life in the Dreamhouse	Ken	Web Series; 74 episodes (voice)
2015	This Is My Roommate	Needy Guy	Episode: "The Right One"
2016	The SeanTal Show	Sean	Miniseries; 5 episodes
2016	Turn: Washington's Spies	Courier 2	Episode: "Trial and Execution"
2017	Bull	Juror #1	Episode: "The Devil, The Detail"
2020	Dwight in Shining Armor	Herald	Episode: "Just Desserts"
2021	Dynasty	Darryl	Episode: "The British Are Coming"
2021	Games People Play	Reporter 1	2 episodes
2022	Naomi	Steve O'Brien	Episode: "Unidentified Flying Object"
2022	Atlanta	Man in Glasses	Episode: "Three Slaps"
2022	Woke	Frank	Episode: "Sole Train"
2022	The First Lady	Reporter	Episode: "Voices Carry"
2022	The Ms. Pat Show	Johnny James	Episode: "Trigger Warning"
2022	The Watcher	Teacher	Episode: "Götterdämmerung"
2022	Step Up: High Water	Reporter #2	Episode: "Never Scared"
2023	Sistas	Westley	2 Episodes
2024	Will Trent	Brent Swann	Episode: "It's Easier to Handcuff a Human Being"
2024	Young Dylan	Jacques Lumiere	Episode: "The Wrap Battle"
2024	1923	Coach Attendant	Episode: "The Mountain Teeth of Monsters"
2025	Leverage: Redemption	Roger	Episode: "The Swipe Right Job"

=== Video games ===
Year	Title	Role	Notes
2013	Barbie Dreamhouse Party	Ken	Voice role

== Stage ==
Year	Title	Role	Notes
1999	Equus	Alan Strang	Chapman University Moulton Hall Studio Theater
2017	Sex Tips for Straight Women from a Gay Man	Dan	Off-Broadway Touring Production

== Awards and nominations ==
Year	Award	Category	Nominated work	Result
2000	OC Weekly Annual Theater Awards	Best College Performance	Equus	Won
