= Casper Kelly =

American filmmaker

- Kelly in 2025
- Born: Christopher Benjamin Kelly; June 29, 1970 (age 56); North Carolina, U.S.
- Occupations: Screenwriter, director, producer
- Notable work: Too Many Cooks; Your Pretty Face Is Going to Hell; Adult Swim Yule Log; Adult Swim Yule Log 2: Branchin' Out; V/H/S/Halloween; Mandy; Buddy

Christopher Benjamin "Casper" Kelly (born: June 29, 1970) is an American screenwriter, director, and producer, largely known for his work for Adult Swim and in horror films.

== Early life ==
Kelly was born in North Carolina. He resided in Saudi Arabia from the ages of 10 to 15 due to his father's job as an engineer. He has said that he frequently read Mad and watched television during his childhood, which served as inspiration for his future projects.

== Career ==
Kelly worked as a production assistant for the 1991 film Basket Case 3: The Progeny shortly after graduating from college. He then began creating promos for Cartoon Network before working for Adult Swim.

Kelly is the co-creator of the Adult Swim live-action series Your Pretty Face Is Going to Hell, the Adult Swim animated series Stroker & Hoop, and the Adult Swim Infomercials episode Too Many Cooks, which he also directed. Too Many Cooks was released online and went viral, amassing over two million views within five days of its release. He also co-directed and co-wrote another Infomercials episode in 2018 titled Final Deployment 4: Queen Battle Walkthrough which subverts livestreaming gaming culture. He has written episodes of Squidbillies, Harvey Birdman, Attorney at Law, Aqua Teen Hunger Force, and Nickelodeon's CatDog.

He is also a fiction writer. His book, More Stories About Spaceships and Cancer, a collection of short stories, was published in 2012. His short story, The Sensitive Person's Joke Book, was published in the web literary magazine Necessary Fiction.

In 2022, he wrote and directed the horror comedy film Adult Swim Yule Log, also known as The Fireplace, which premiered on Adult Swim on December 11.

In 2023, he created Star Trek: Very Short Treks. A promotional series for the 50th anniversary of Star Trek: The Animated Series

In 2024, he wrote and directed the horror comedy film Adult Swim Yule Log 2: Branchin' Out, which premiered on Adult Swim on December 6.

On 23 July 2025, Variety revealed that Kelly was among the filmmakers who directed a segment for V/H/S/Halloween, Shudder's 8th installment in their horror anthology V/H/S franchise. The film was released in October 2025.

In 2026, he wrote and directed Buddy, which premiered on August 28th in many theaters across the US. This was the first of his projects to be released in theaters.

== Personal life ==
Kelly is a longtime resident of Atlanta, Georgia.

== Filmography ==
=== Television ===
Year	Title	Director	Writer	Producer	Creator	Notes
1998	CatDog	No	Yes	No	No	2 episodes
1999	Cartoon Network Shorties	No	Yes	No	No	Episode: "Thanks a Latte"
1999	The Scooby-Doo Project	Yes	Yes	Yes	No	
2000	Cartoon Cartoon Fridays	No	Yes	Yes	No	
2000–2004	Harvey Birdman, Attorney at Law	No	Yes	Yes	No	2 episodes
2001	What a Cartoon!	No	Yes	No	No	Major Flake: Soggy Sale
2001	Night of the Living Doo	Yes	Yes	Yes	No	
2001	Big Game XXIX: Bugs vs. Daffy	No	Yes	Yes	No	
2003–2010	Aqua Teen Hunger Force	No	Yes	No	No	Story elements
2004–2005	Stroker & Hoop	No	Yes	Yes	Yes	
2005	Sunday Pants	No	Yes	No	No	
2008–2014	Squidbillies	No	Yes	No	No	
2011, 2013–2019	Your Pretty Face Is Going to Hell	Yes	Yes	Yes	Yes	
2014–2020	Infomercials	Yes	Yes	Yes	Yes	3 episodes: "Too Many Cooks", "Final Deployment 4: Queen Battle Walkthrough" and "Danny Ketchup"
2017–2018	The Truth	No	Yes	No	No	
2019	Archer	No	Yes	No	No	
2023	Agent Elvis	No	No	Yes	No	
2023	Star Trek: Very Short Treks	No	Yes	Yes	Yes	

=== Film ===
Year	Title	Director	Writer	Producer	Notes
2010	Please Please Pick Up	Yes	Yes	Yes	
2018	Mandy	No	Yes	No	Cheddar Goblin segment
2022	Adult Swim Yule Log (also known as The Fireplace)	Yes	Yes	Yes	
2024	Adult Swim Yule Log 2: Branchin' Out	Yes	Yes	Yes	
2025	V/H/S/Halloween	Yes	Yes	No	"Fun Size" segment
2026	Buddy	Yes	Yes	No	

Actor

Year	Title	Role
2011	Pleasant People	Chris
2016	Frankenstein Created Bikers	Deputy Maddox
2011, 2013–2019	Your Pretty Face Is Going to Hell	Self
2017	The Cry of Mann	Postmaster
2018	Final Deployment 4: Queen Battle Walkthrough	Gamer 1
