= The New Schematics =

The New Schematics is an indie and alternative rock band based in Nashville, Tennessee, founded April 21, 2015. The members include Cory Bishop (main vocals and guitar), Michael Bare (bass guitar and vocals), and Shanan Lau (guitar and vocals). Rotating members include Jonathan Truman, Danny Pratt, John Briggs, Ayrton Gauerke, Eric Montgomery, and Andrew Bergthold.

The band made their debut on October 2, 2015, with their self-titled EP The New Schematics. The EP consisted of 5 songs, including their most popular song "Born Without Borders." When the band first formed, they set out on a 15-month tour named after the hit single "Born Without Borders." They blazed through 42 cities and played 97 shows throughout the US and Canada, gaining the reputation as an act with the "crowd control skills of preachers" (Cougar Microbes). Since then, the band has released an unplugged EP with a bonus song called "Drug" along with the acoustic versions of songs from the original self-titled EP and released a new EP on 24 February 2017 entitled Your Year with five new tracks.

== History ==
=== Formation ===
In 2014, Cory Bishop ventured out to record his solo EP entitled Cory Bishop in Nashville, Tennessee. Drummer Ayrton Gauerke played the drums on this solo project and continued to act as the drummer of The New Schematics – EP. Shortly after starting the solo EP recording process, Bishop decided to turn the solo EP into The New Schematics – EP and the band members in The New Schematics came from that. Close friend Michael Bare, who Bishop met at another show in Nashville, became the second half of the duo when this EP was created. Drummer Gauerke played with The New Schematics until drummer Danny Pratt began to fill his place (among other hired drummers) in June 2015. Pratt played with the band more regularly August 2015 through September 2016 and also recorded the band's second EP, Your Year (released February 24, 2017). During the time Pratt was still drumming for the band, guitarist for opening band The Riflery, Shanan Lau, made the decision to join the band as a full-time member. They then met Jonathan Truman in January 2016 who began to play drums for hire in March 2016, June 2016, and again in October 2016. Truman has played with the band for the entirety of 2017, but is rumored to be splitting in late May.

=== The New Schematics – EP (2015) ===
Released October 2, 2015, this EP was the first project for the new brand new band The New Schematics. The most popular song from the EP being their staple song for their first tour, "Born Without Borders." Produced, mixed, and mastered by Andrew Bergthold. Recorded at The Farm in Franklin, Tennessee.

=== The New Schematics (Unplugged+) EP (2016) ===
Released March 18, 2016, Unplugged+ features rearranged versions of songs from the self titled EP with a bonus track entitled "Drug." Produced by Eric Montgomery (except for "Drug" produced by Andrew Bergthold and John Briggs). Mixed and mastered by Eric Uplinger.

=== Your Year – EP (2017) ===
Released February 24, 2017, Your Year – EP represents a new artistic direction for The New Schematics and simultaneously encourages listeners to claim the year they are given – no matter what month it is. Produced, mixed and mastered by Andrew Bergthold, except "Timeless Love" mixed by Eric Uplinger and "Your Year" mixed by Warren David and mastered by Jason Germaine. Engineering and editing assistance by Jake Wigal.

== Members ==
- Cory Bishop – lead vocals, harmonica, acoustic guitar, keyboard (2015–present)
- Michael Bare – bass guitar, vocals (2015–present)
- Jonathan Truman – background vocals, drummer for Your Year tour (2016–present)

=== Past members/contributors ===
- Danny Pratt – drum kit, percussion (2015–17)
- Andrew Bergthold – synthesizers, programming, additional percussion (2015–17)
- John Briggs – guitars, high strung guitars, electric guitars, mandolin, vocals (2015–16)
- Eric Montgomery – keyboard, additional percussion (2015–16)
- Ayrton Gauerke – drum kit, percussion (2015–16)
- Cara Fox – cello (2016)
- Matt Scibillia – shaker, tambourine (2016)
- Shanan Lau – lead guitar, vocals (2016–2017)

== Discography ==
Album / EP	Title	Writer(s)	Length
The New Schematics EP (2015)	"Break My Heart"	Cory Bishop, Michael Bare	4:36
The New Schematics EP (2015)	"Midnight"	Bishop, Bare	3:14
The New Schematics EP (2015)	"Born Without Borders"	Bishop	4:19
The New Schematics EP (2015)	"All In"	Bishop, Bare	3:58
The New Schematics EP (2015)	"The Breakdown"	Bishop	3:24
The New Schematics (Unplugged+) EP (2016)	"Break My Heart (Unplugged)"	Bishop, Bare	4:40
The New Schematics (Unplugged+) EP (2016)	"Midnight (Unplugged)"	Bishop, Bare	3:18
The New Schematics (Unplugged+) EP (2016)	"Born Without Borders (Unplugged)"	Bishop	4:22
The New Schematics (Unplugged+) EP (2016)	"All In (Unplugged)"	Bishop, Bare	3:39
The New Schematics (Unplugged+) EP (2016)	"The Breakdown (Unplugged)"	Bishop	3:39
The New Schematics (Unplugged+) EP (2016)	"Drug"	Bishop	3:42
Your Year (2017)	"Your Year"	Bishop, Bare	4:40
Your Year (2017)	"All of My Desire"	Bishop	2:56
Your Year (2017)	"Sunday Morning"	Bishop	3:18
Your Year (2017)	"Take Back My Soul"	Bishop, Bare	3:20
Your Year (2017)	"Timeless Love"	Bishop	4:17

=== Music videos ===
- "Born Without Borders"
- "The Breakdown"
- "Your Year"
