= Jeffrey Zaslow =

American author, and newspaper columnist (1958–2012)

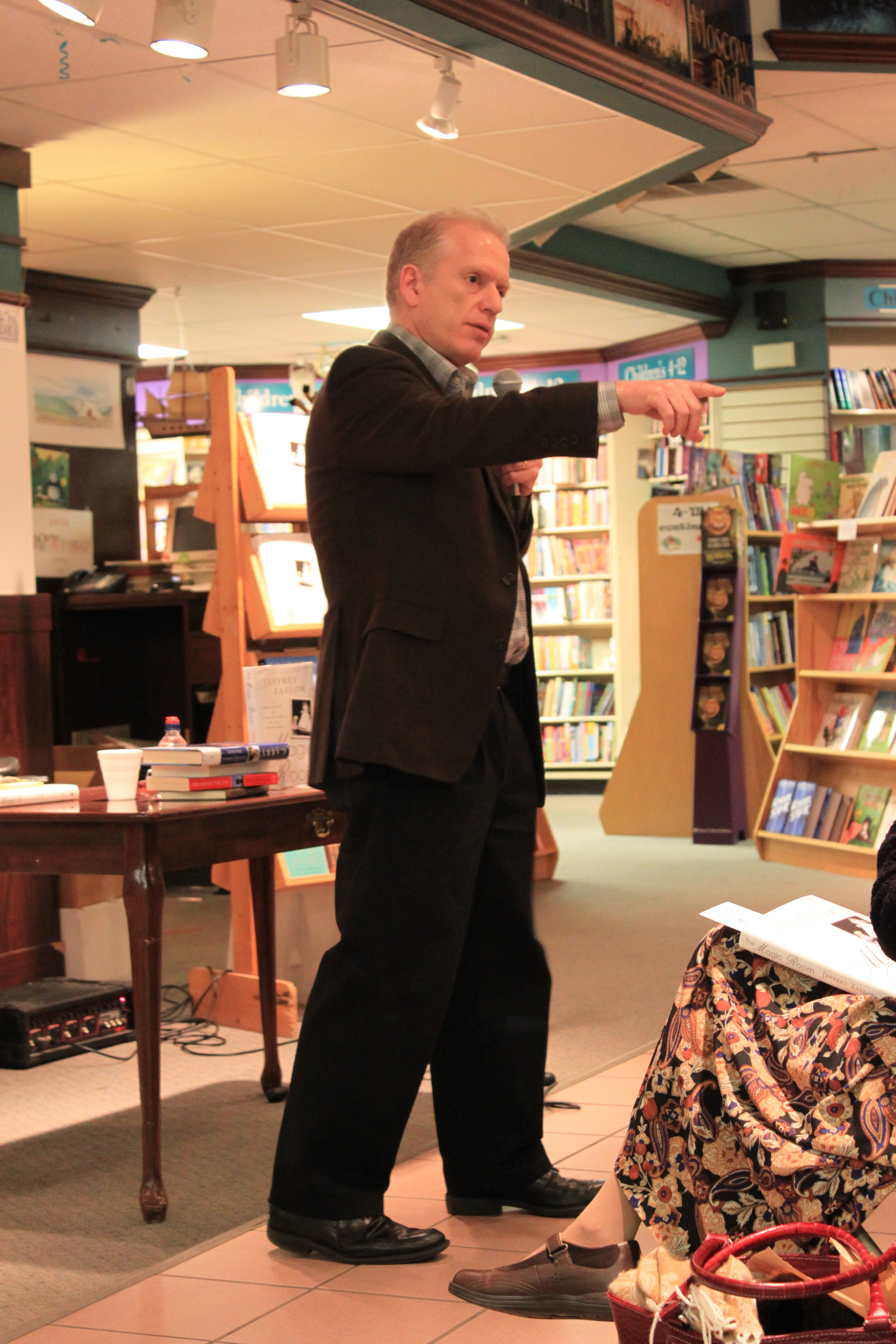
- Zaslow in 2012
- Born: Jeffrey Lloyd Zaslow; October 6, 1958; Broomall, Pennsylvania, U.S.
- Died: February 10, 2012 (aged 53); Warner Township, Michigan, U.S.
- Education: Carnegie Mellon University
- Occupation: Journalist
- Spouse: Sherry Margolis
- Website: Official website

Jeffrey Lloyd Zaslow (October 6, 1958 – February 10, 2012) was an American author and journalist, and a columnist for The Wall Street Journal.

Zaslow was widely known as a coauthor of books, and the sole author of numerous books.

== Early life and education ==
Zaslow was born in 1958 in Broomall, Pennsylvania, a suburb of Philadelphia, one of four children of Naomi and Harry Zaslow. His father was a real estate investor. His family was Jewish. He attended Marple Newtown High School, where he was student council president his senior year. He wrote for the school paper and was in school plays while in junior high, starring in You Can't Take It with You. After graduating from Carnegie Mellon University in 1980 with a degree in creative writing, Zaslow began his professional writing career at the Orlando Sentinel.

== Career ==
Zaslow first worked at the Orlando Sentinel, as a writer for that newspaper's Florida magazine. He then was a staff writer for the Wall Street Journal from 1983 to 1987 and columnist at the Chicago Sun-Times from 1987 to 2001.

Zaslow gained recognition as the author of an advice column called "All That Zazz", having won a competition (with 12,000 applicants) at age 29 to replace Ann Landers at the Chicago Sun-Times.

Zaslow's Wall Street Journal column, "Moving On", as well as his numerous books, focused on life transitions.

In September 2007, after he attended the final lecture of Carnegie Mellon University Professor Randy Pausch, he collaborated with Pausch on writing The Last Lecture, released in 2008. The book by Pausch and Zaslow, translated into 48 languages, was a #1 New York Times best-seller, spending more than 110 weeks on the list, and sold more than five million copies. Media coverage included The Oprah Winfrey Show and an ABC special hosted by Diane Sawyer.

The Girls from Ames is a nonfiction book about a group of eleven women friends who grew up together in Ames, Iowa, remaining friends for forty years. It spent 26 weeks on the New York Times bestseller list, rising as high as #3.

Highest Duty was co-written by Zaslow with Capt. Chesley Sullenberger, who successfully ditched US Airways Flight 1549 in the Hudson River in 2009. The book debuted at #3 on the New York Times list.

In 2011, Zaslow collaborated with Gabby Giffords and her husband, astronaut Mark Kelly, on their memoir, Gabby: A Story of Courage and Hope.

In January 2012, Zaslow released The Magic Room: A story about the love we wish for our daughters, a non-fiction narrative set at a small-town Michigan bridal shop, which looked at the lives of a handful of brides and their parents who journeyed to the store's "Magic Room."

Zaslow was twice named by the National Society of Newspaper Columnists as best columnist in a newspaper with more than 100,000 circulation and had received the Distinguished Column Writing Award from the New York Newspaper Publishers Association. While working at the Sun-Times, Zaslow received the Will Rogers Humanitarian Award. He appeared on such television programs as The Tonight Show, The Oprah Winfrey Show, Larry King Live, 60 Minutes, The Today Show, and Good Morning America.

== Personal life ==
Zaslow married Sherry Margolis, a TV news anchor with WJBK television in Detroit, and together lived with their three daughters in West Bloomfield, Michigan. His literary agent was Gary Morris. Zaslow was an avid runner.

Zaslow died on February 10, 2012, at age 53 in a car accident on M-32 in Warner Township, Michigan while on tour for his non-fiction book The Magic Room. Former co-author Chesley Sullenberger was among those who eulogized Zaslow at his funeral on February 13.

Following his death, Zaslow was the subject of a number of written tributes, including an essay by columnist Bob Greene, titled Jeff Zaslow's last lesson, pieces by fellow journalists and by bloggers, posts on the Wall Street Journal remembrance page, and eulogies by family members on the family's remembrance page.

== Works ==
=== Non-fiction ===
Biographies

- The Last Lecture (2008, with Randy Pausch) ISBN 1-4013-2325-1
- Highest Duty: My Search for What Really Matters (2009, with Chesley Sullenberger), memoir ISBN 978-0-06-192468-2
- The Girls from Ames: A Story of Women and a Forty-Year Friendship (2009), memoir ISBN 9781592405329
- Gabby: A Story of Courage and Hope (2011, with Gabby Giffords, and her husband, astronaut Mark Kelly) ISBN 9781451661071
- The Magic Room: A Story About the Love We Wish for Our Daughters (2011), memoir ISBN 1592407412

Self-help

- Tell Me All About It: A Personal Look at the Advice Business by "the Man Who Replaced Ann Landers" (1989)
- Take It from Us: Advice from 262 Celebrities on Everything That Matters-To Them and to You (1994)
- Talk of Fame: Good Advice from Great Celebrities (1997)

== Adaptations ==
- Sully (2016), film directed by Clint Eastwood, based on the autobiography Highest Duty: My Search for What Really Matters
- "Pilot's Code" (2025), episode of The Rehearsal in which passages on Sullenberger's life from Highest Duty are recreated.
