= Jason's Cradle =

Maritime rescue device made of stiffened netting

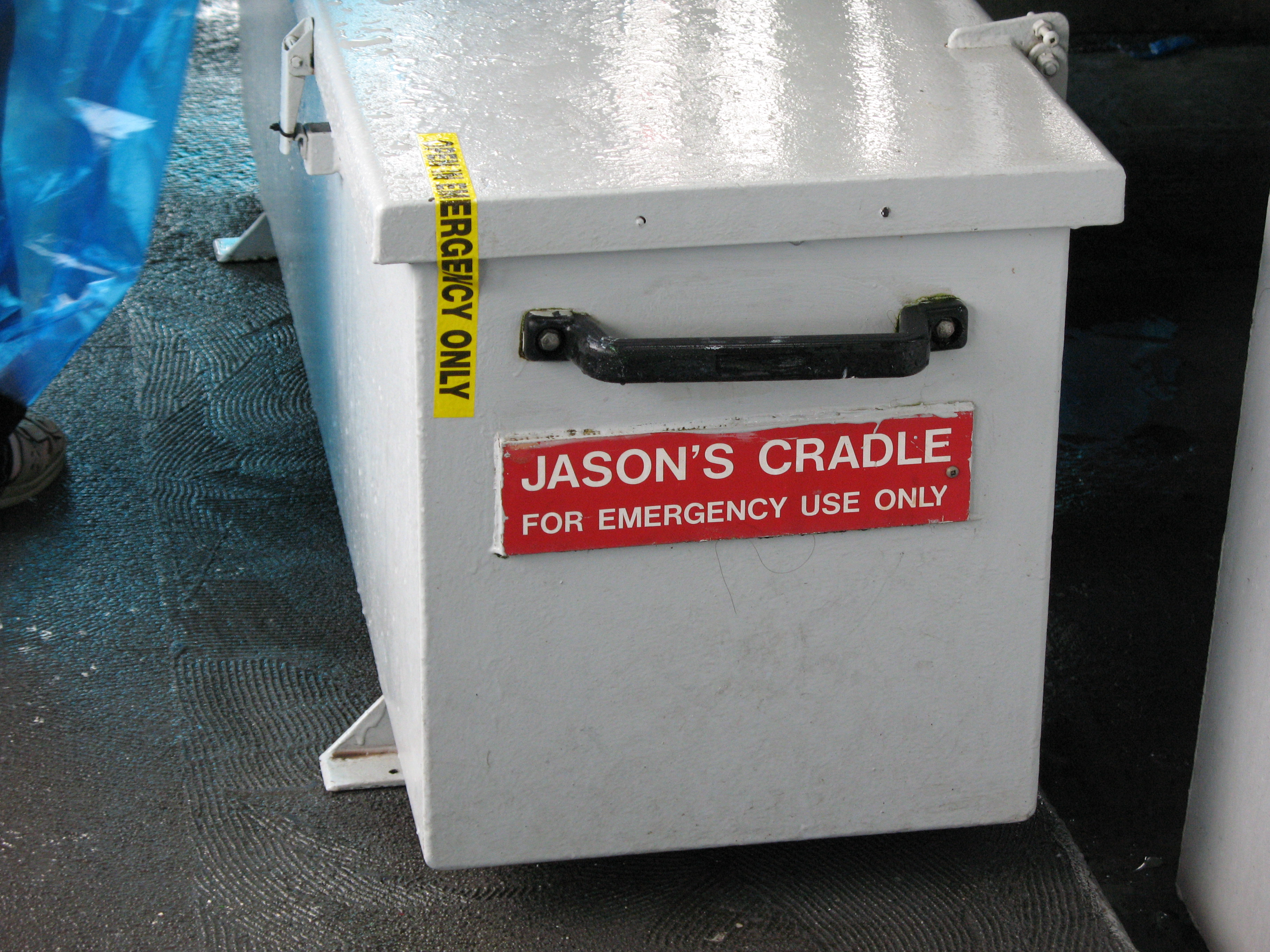
Box containing Jason's Cradle

A Jason's cradle is a maritime rescue device. The device is similar to a scramble net made of cloth webbing. It can be suspended over a rail, but it has stiffener batts which make it easier to climb. It can take the form of a hammock or stretcher for the rescue of weakened or injured people when the "top" and "bottom" of the net are lowered to the water level so they can simply roll into it. Different sizes are available, both for pleasure craft as well as for maritime search and rescue applications.

NY Waterway mariners train in the use of Jason's Cradles and employed them when rescuing the passengers of US Airways Flight 1549 from the Hudson River.

The Jason's Cradle is a registered trademark of Land & Marine Products Ltd. of Wimborne, Dorset, UK.
