= The Girls from Ames =

2009 book by Jeffrey Zaslow

- Author: Jeffrey Zaslow
- Publication date: 2009
- ISBN: 9781592404452

The Girls from Ames: A Story of Women and a Forty-year Friendship is a 2009 book by Jeffrey Zaslow, about a group of women from Ames, Iowa and their lifelong friendships.

In the book, Zaslow chronicled eleven childhood friends who formed a special bond growing up in Ames. After college, they moved to eight different states, yet managed to maintain an enduring friendship that would carry them through college and careers, marriage and motherhood, dating and divorce, a child's illness and the mysterious death of one member of their group.

At the time of Zaslow's writing, the women were in their mid-forties. Jenny Litchman was assistant dean at the University of Maryland School of Medicine. Kelly Zwagerman and Sally Hamilton were teachers in Minnesota and Iowa. Cathy Highland was a makeup artist in Los Angeles. Karen Leininger, Karla Blackwood and Marilyn Johnson were stay-at-home moms in Pennsylvania, Montana and Minnesota. Diana Sarussi, once a CPA, worked at a Starbucks in Arizona. Jane Nash was a psychology professor in Massachusetts. Angela Jamison owned a public-relations firm in North Carolina.

Those bonds are just not there... don't get me wrong. I talk to my wife, and that's it. I play poker every Thursday night with the guys, and we can go six hours and not one person will say a thing. And 80 percent of the conversation that does occur is about the cards.

Jeffrey Zaslow

(commenting on the difference between men and women, after writing The Girls from Ames)
