= Sully Sullenberger =

American pilot and diplomat (born 1951)

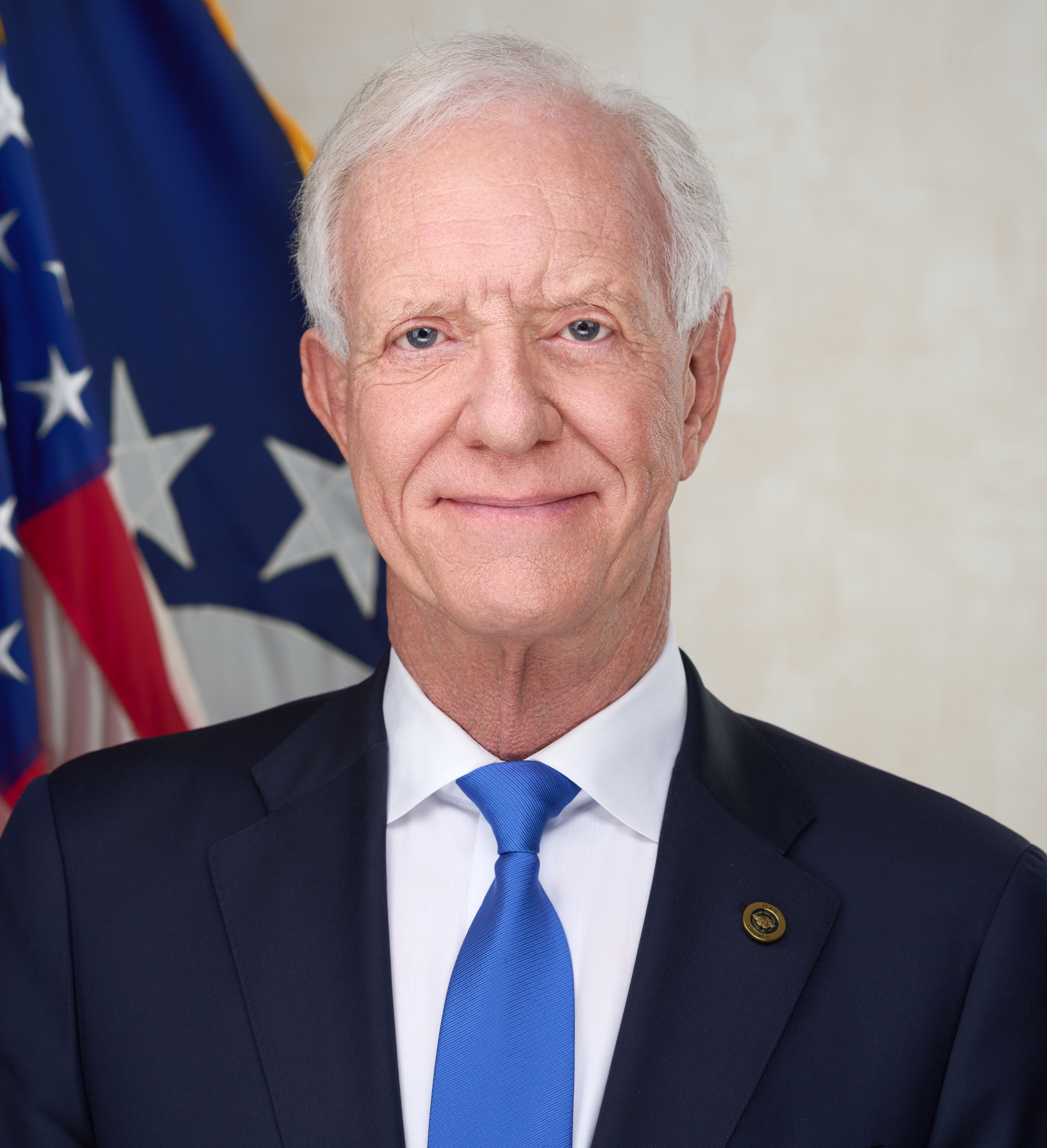
- Official portrait, 2022

United States Ambassador to the International Civil Aviation Organization
- In office February 3, 2022 – July 1, 2022
- President: Joe Biden
- Preceded by: Sean E. Doocey
- Succeeded by: Brent Christensen

Personal details
- Born: Chesley Burnett Sullenberger III; January 23, 1951 (age 75) Denison, Texas, U.S.
- Party: Republican
- Spouse: Lorrie Henry (m. 1989)
- Children: 2
- Education: USAFA(BS); Purdue University(MS); UNCO(MPA)
- Known for: 2009 Hudson River plane crash
- Awards: See below
- Military career
- Allegiance: United States
- Branch: United States Air Force
- Service years: 1973–1980
- Rank: Captain

Chesley Burnett "Sully" Sullenberger III (born January 23, 1951) is an American retired aircraft pilot, diplomat and aviation safety expert, who is best known for his actions as captain of US Airways Flight 1549 on January 15, 2009, when he ditched the plane on the Hudson River after both engines were disabled by a bird strike; all 155 people aboard survived. After the Hudson landing, Sullenberger became an outspoken advocate for aviation safety and helped develop new protocols for flight safety. He served as the co-chairman, along with his co-pilot on Flight 1549, Jeffrey Skiles, of the Experimental Aircraft Association (EAA)'s Young Eagles youth introduction-to-aviation program from 2009 to 2013.

Sullenberger retired from US Airways in 2010, after 30 years as a commercial pilot. In 2011, he was hired by CBS News as an aviation and safety expert.

Sullenberger is the co-author, with Jeffrey Zaslow, of the New York Times bestseller Highest Duty: My Search for What Really Matters, a memoir of his life and of the events surrounding Flight 1549. His second book, Making a Difference: Stories of Vision and Courage from America's Leaders, was published in 2012. He was ranked second in Time's Top 100 Most Influential Heroes and Icons of 2009, after Michelle Obama.

In 2021, President Joe Biden announced he would nominate Sullenberger as U.S. representative to the International Civil Aviation Organization (ICAO) with the rank of ambassador. He was confirmed by unanimous consent in the Senate and served in that role from February 3 to July 1, 2022.

In July 2026, Sullenberger was diagnosed with Alzheimer's disease and has publicly shared his diagnosis to spread awareness for other families who have a family member that shares the illness. He noted struggles such as forgetting names, recent stories that he was told and having sleep problems.

== Early life ==
Chesley Burnett Sullenberger III was born January 23, 1951, in Denison, Texas. His father was a descendant of Swiss-German immigrants named Sollenberger (modern spelling is Sollberger) from Wynigen, Switzerland. He has one younger sister, Mary. The street on which he grew up was named after his mother's family. According to his sister, Sullenberger built model planes and aircraft carriers during his childhood; she says he became interested in flying after seeing military jets from an Air Force base near his house. He went to school in Denison and was consistently on the 99th percentile in every academic category.

At age 11, his IQ was deemed high enough that he was allowed to join Mensa International. In high school, he was the president of the Latin club, a first chair flutist, and an honor student. He was an active member of the Waples Memorial United Methodist Church. He graduated from Denison High School in 1969, near the top of his class of about 350. At 16, Sullenberger learned to fly in an Aeronca Champion 7DC at a private airstrip near his home. He said that the training he received from a local flight instructor influenced his aviation career.

Sullenberger earned a Bachelor of Science degree in psychology and basic sciences from the United States Air Force Academy. He earned a master's degree in industrial-organizational psychology from Purdue University in 1973 and a Master of Public Administration from University of Northern Colorado in 1979.

== Military service ==
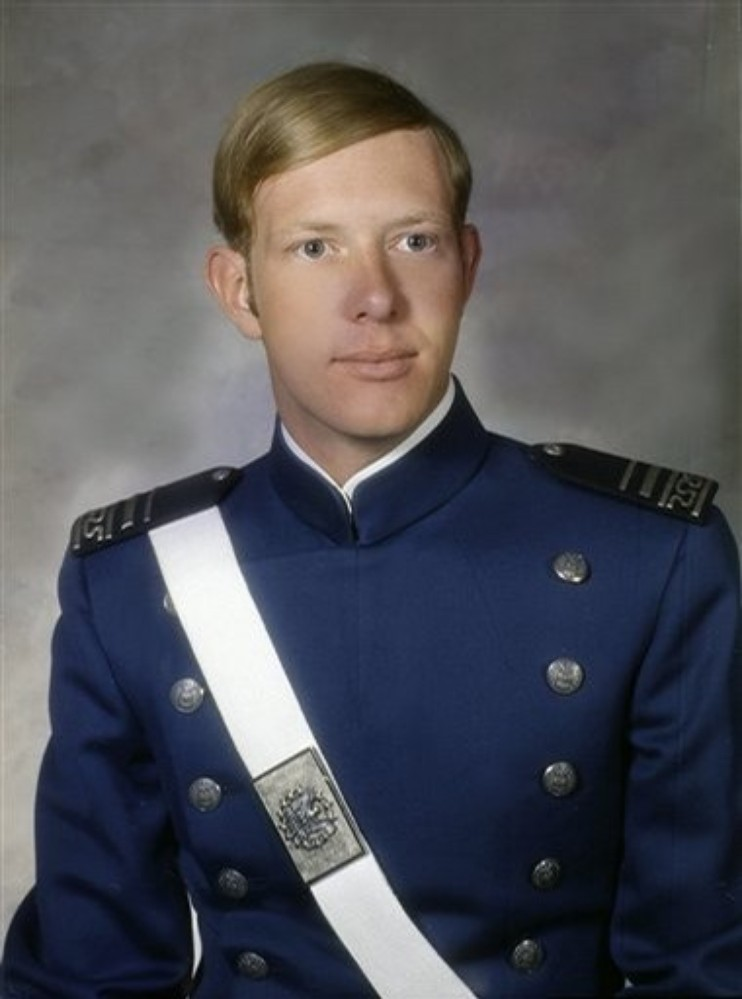
Sullenberger's 1973 Air Force Academy senior class photograph

Sullenberger was appointed to the United States Air Force Academy, entering with the Class of 1973 in June 1969. He was selected along with around a dozen other freshmen for a cadet glider program, and by the end of that year, he was an instructor pilot. When he graduated in 1973, he received the Outstanding Cadet in Airmanship award, as the class's "top flyer". Immediately following his graduation with a Bachelor of Science degree and his commissioning as an officer, the Air Force sent Sullenberger to Purdue University to pursue a master's degree prior to entering Undergraduate Pilot Training (UPT).

Following completion of his master's, he was assigned to UPT at Columbus AFB, Mississippi, flying the T-37 Tweet and T-38 Talon. After earning his wings in 1975 as a pilot, he completed replacement training in the F-4 Phantom II at Luke AFB, Arizona. This was followed by his assignment to the 493rd Tactical Fighter Squadron of 48th Tactical Fighter Wing at RAF Lakenheath, United Kingdom, in the F-4D Phantom II.

Following his assignment at RAF Lakenheath, he was reassigned to the 428th Tactical Fighter Squadron of the 474th Tactical Fighter Wing at Nellis AFB, Nevada, again flying the F-4D. He advanced to become a flight leader and a training officer and attained the rank of captain. He gained experience in Europe, the Pacific, and at Nellis Air Force Base, and operated as Blue Force mission commander in Red Flag Exercises. He served on an aircraft accident investigation board.

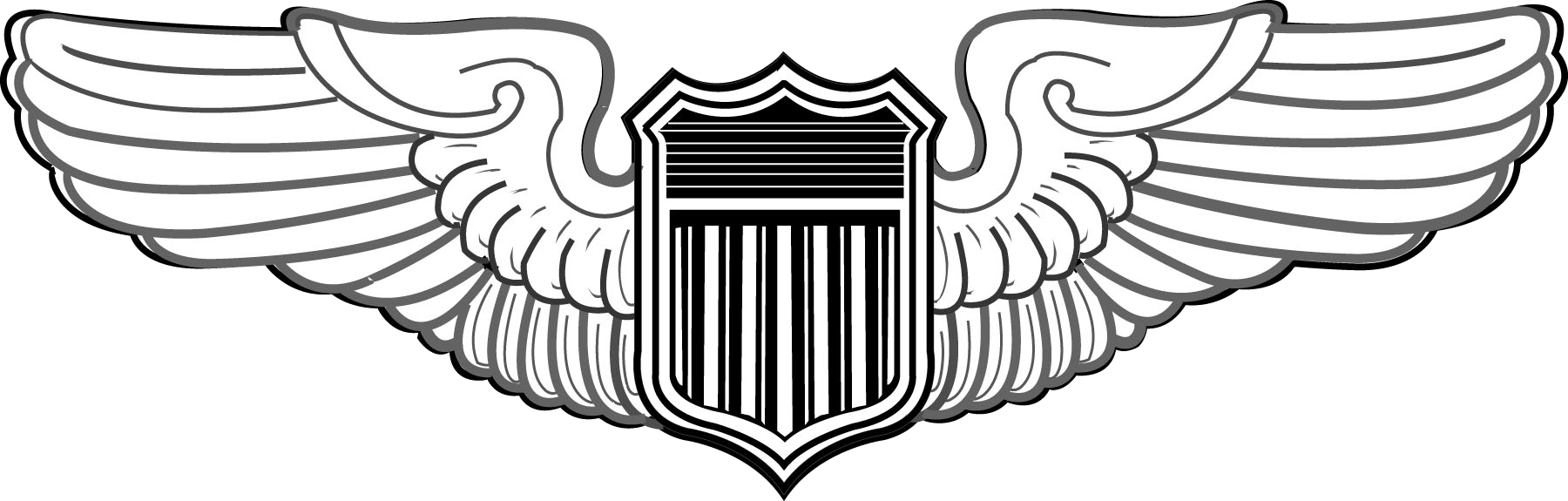

Badge	United States Air Force Pilot Badge		
Badge	Basic Parachutist Badge		
1st Row	Air and Space Outstanding Unit Award		
2nd Row	National Defense Service Medal	Air and Space Longevity Service Award	Marksmanship ribbon

== Civil aviation career ==
Sullenberger worked for US Airways and its predecessor airlines from 1980 until 2010. (Pacific Southwest Airlines was acquired by US Air, later US Airways, in 1988.) He holds an airline transport pilot certificate for single and multi-engine airplanes, a commercial pilot license rating in gliders, and a flight instructor certificate for airplanes (single, multi-engine, and instrument) and gliders. In total, he has more than 50 years and 20,000 hours of flying experience. In 2007, he became the founder and CEO of Safety Reliability Methods, Inc. (SRM), a firm providing strategic and tactical guidance to enhance organizational safety, performance, and reliability. He has been involved in a number of accident investigations conducted by the USAF and the National Transportation Safety Board (NTSB), such as Pacific Southwest Airlines Flight 1771 and USAir Flight 1493. He served as an instructor, Air Line Pilots Association local air safety chairman, accident investigator, and national technical committee member. His safety work for ALPA led to the development of a Federal Aviation Administration advisory circular. He was instrumental in developing and implementing the Crew Resource Management course that was used by US Airways, and he has taught the course to hundreds of airline crew members.

Working with NASA scientists, he coauthored a paper on error-inducing contexts in aviation. He was an air accident investigator for an NTSB inquiry into a major accident at Los Angeles International Airport, which "led to improved airline procedures and training for emergency evacuations of aircraft." Sullenberger studied the psychology behind keeping an airline crew functioning during a crisis.

Sullenberger was active with his union, serving as chairman of a safety committee within the Air Line Pilots Association.

He was a featured speaker for two panels: one on aviation and one on patient safety in medicine, at the High Reliability Organizations (HRO) 2007 International Conference in 2007.

=== US Airways Flight 1549 ("Miracle on the Hudson") ===
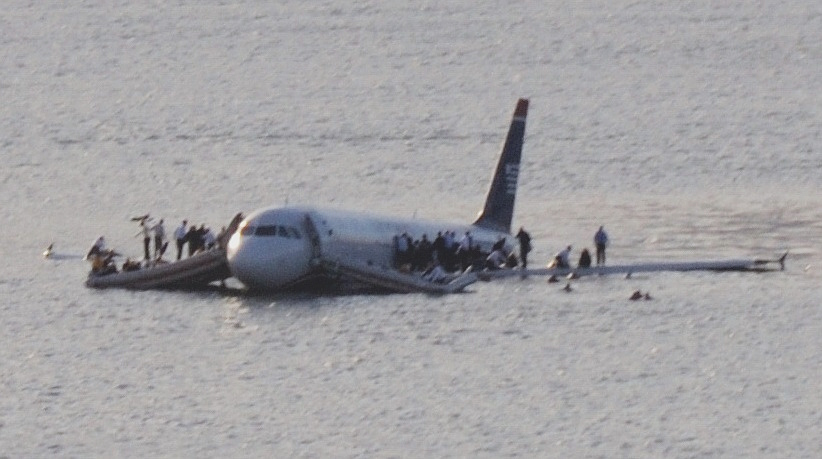
US Airways Flight 1549 afloat in the Hudson River

On January 15, 2009, Sullenberger was the captain of US Airways Flight 1549, an Airbus A320 taking off from LaGuardia Airport in New York City bound for Charlotte Douglas International Airport in North Carolina. Shortly after takeoff, the plane struck a flock of Canada geese and lost power in both engines. Quickly determining he would be unable to reach either LaGuardia or Teterboro Airports, Sullenberger flew the plane to an emergency water landing on the Hudson River. All 155 people on board survived and were rescued.

Sullenberger said later: "It was very quiet as we worked, my copilot Jeff Skiles and I. We were a team. But to have zero thrust coming out of those engines was shocking—the silence." Sullenberger was the last to leave the aircraft, after twice making sweeps through the cabin to make sure all passengers and crew had evacuated.

Sullenberger, described by friends as "shy and reticent", was noted for his poise and calm during the crisis; New York City Mayor Michael Bloomberg dubbed him "Captain Cool". Nonetheless, Sullenberger suffered symptoms of post-traumatic stress disorder in subsequent weeks, including sleeplessness and flashbacks. He said that the moments before the landing were "the worst sickening, pit-of-your-stomach, falling-through-the-floor feeling" that he had ever experienced. He also said, "One way of looking at this might be that for 42 years, I've been making small, regular deposits in this bank of experience, education and training. And on January 15, the balance was sufficient so that I could make a very large withdrawal."

The National Transportation Safety Board ruled that landing on the river was the correct decision instead of attempting a return to LaGuardia Airport because the normal procedures for engine loss are designed for cruising altitudes, not immediately after takeoff. Simulations performed at the Airbus Training Centre Europe in Toulouse showed that Flight 1549 could have made it back to LaGuardia had that maneuver begun immediately after the bird strike. However, such scenarios both neglected the time necessary for the pilots to understand and assess the situation, and risked the possibility of a crash within a densely populated area.

=== Post-flight accolades and publicity ===
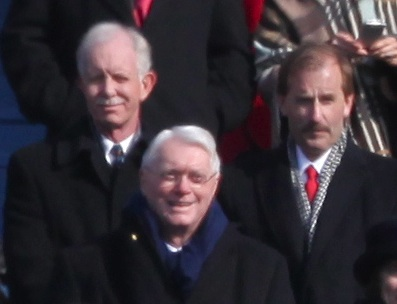
Sullenberger (back left) and first officer Jeffrey Skiles (back right) at the first inauguration of Barack Obama on 20 January 2009, with Kentucky Senator Jim Bunning in front

U.S. President George W. Bush called Sullenberger to thank him for saving the lives of the passengers, as did President-elect Barack Obama, who invited him and the crew to join the presidential inauguration ceremony. On January 16, 2009, the United States Senate passed a resolution recognizing and honoring Sullenberger, Skiles, the cabin crew, the passengers, and the first responders involved in Flight 1549's emergency landing. The United States House of Representatives passed a similar resolution on January 26, 2009.

Sullenberger attended the presidential inauguration on January 20, 2009, where he and his wife met President Obama. On January 22, 2009, he and the rest of the crew of Flight 1549 were awarded a Masters Medal by the Guild of Air Pilots and Air Navigators. A ceremony for Sullenberger was held on January 24, 2009, in Sullenberger's town of Danville, California, where he was presented with awards including Danville's "Key to the Town", and was named an honorary Danville police officer. While in the Tri-Valley, Sullenberger gave his first official interview to Jega Sanmugam of The Wildcat Tribune, the student newspaper of Dougherty Valley High School, which his daughter attended at the time. In a special February 2009 edition, the Tribune published "Heroism & Humility on the Hudson", covering Sullenberger and the Flight 1549 landing.

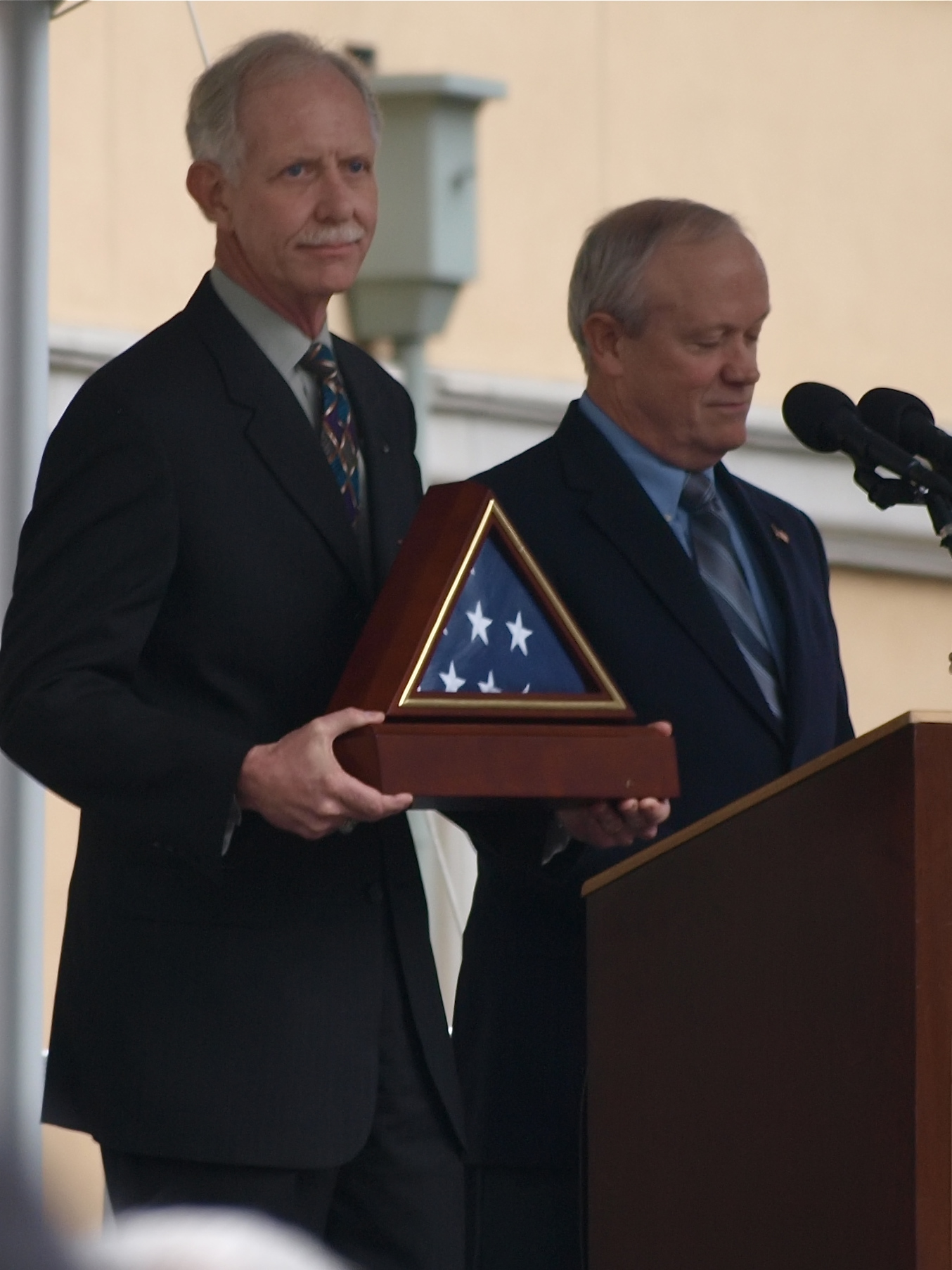
California Congressman Jerry McNerney presenting Sullenberger with a framed flag on January 24, 2009

San Ramon Valley Fire Protection District Chief Richard Price presented Captain Sullenberger with his district's highest award, the Medal of Valor, which had been given only a few times in the district's history. Sullenberger, Skiles, and Flight 1549's cabin crew—Doreen Welsh, Sheila Dail, and Donna Dent—were honored with a standing ovation during the Super Bowl XLIII pre-game ceremony on February 1, 2009. Sullenberger was awarded with honorary lifetime membership in the Seaplane Pilots Association. In 2009, Sullenberger was awarded the Founders' Medal by The Air League. Admirers of Sullenberger started a Facebook fan site that, as of late February 2009, had half a million members.

A library book, Just Culture: Balancing Safety and Accountability was in Sullenberger's luggage left behind in the cockpit. When Sullenberger notified the library that the water-damaged book had been recovered, it made a point of waiving any late fees. Bloomberg presented Sullenberger with a new copy along with the Key to the City of New York.

Sullenberger threw out the first pitch of the 2009 Major League Baseball season for the San Francisco Giants. His Giants jersey was inscribed with the name "Sully" and the number 155—a reference to the 155 people aboard the plane.

On June 6, 2009, Sullenberger returned to Denison to participate in the town's D-Day celebration and to give the commencement address for his alma mater, marking the 40th anniversary of his graduation from the school.

Sullenberger made an appearance in St. Louis, Missouri, on July 14, 2009, to participate in the Red Carpet All-Star Parade before the 2009 Major League Baseball All-Star Game.

On February 24, 2009, Sullenberger testified before the U.S. House of Representatives Subcommittee on Aviation of the Committee on Transportation and Infrastructure that his salary had been cut by 40 percent, and that his pension, like most airline pensions, was terminated and replaced by a PBGC guarantee worth only pennies on the dollar. He cautioned that airlines were "under pressure to hire people with less experience. Their salaries are so low that people with greater experience will not take those jobs. We have some carriers that have hired some pilots with only a few hundred hours of experience. ... There's simply no substitute for experience in terms of aviation safety."

The Sullenberger Aviation Museum in Charlotte, North Carolina is named for him. It houses a Miracle on the Hudson exhibit.

On July 14, 2026, Sullenberger told the public that he had been diagnosed with Alzheimer's in 2025. "It is early stage. For now, this means a name may not come easily to me, I forget a story I have recently told, or I don't sleep as well, but I am in the beginning of this long journey."

==== Recognition ====
- American Speech-Language-Hearing Association (ASHA) Annie Glenn Award (2021)
- Tony Jannus Award (2018)
- EAA Freedom of Flight Award (2015, with Jeff Skiles)
- National Air and Space Museum (NASM) Trophy for Current Achievement (2010, with rest of Flight 1549 crew)
- Legion of Honour (Officer) (2010)
- Time's 100 Most Influential Heroes and Icons (2009)
- Master's Medal from the Guild of Air Pilots and Air Navigators (2009, with Flight 1549 crew)
- Key to the City from New York City (2009, with Flight 1549 crew)
- Key to the Town from Danville, California (2009)
- Chris Matthews' Hardball Award (2009)
- Jabara Award for Airmanship (2009)
- Air League Founders' Medal (2009)

== Post-retirement ==
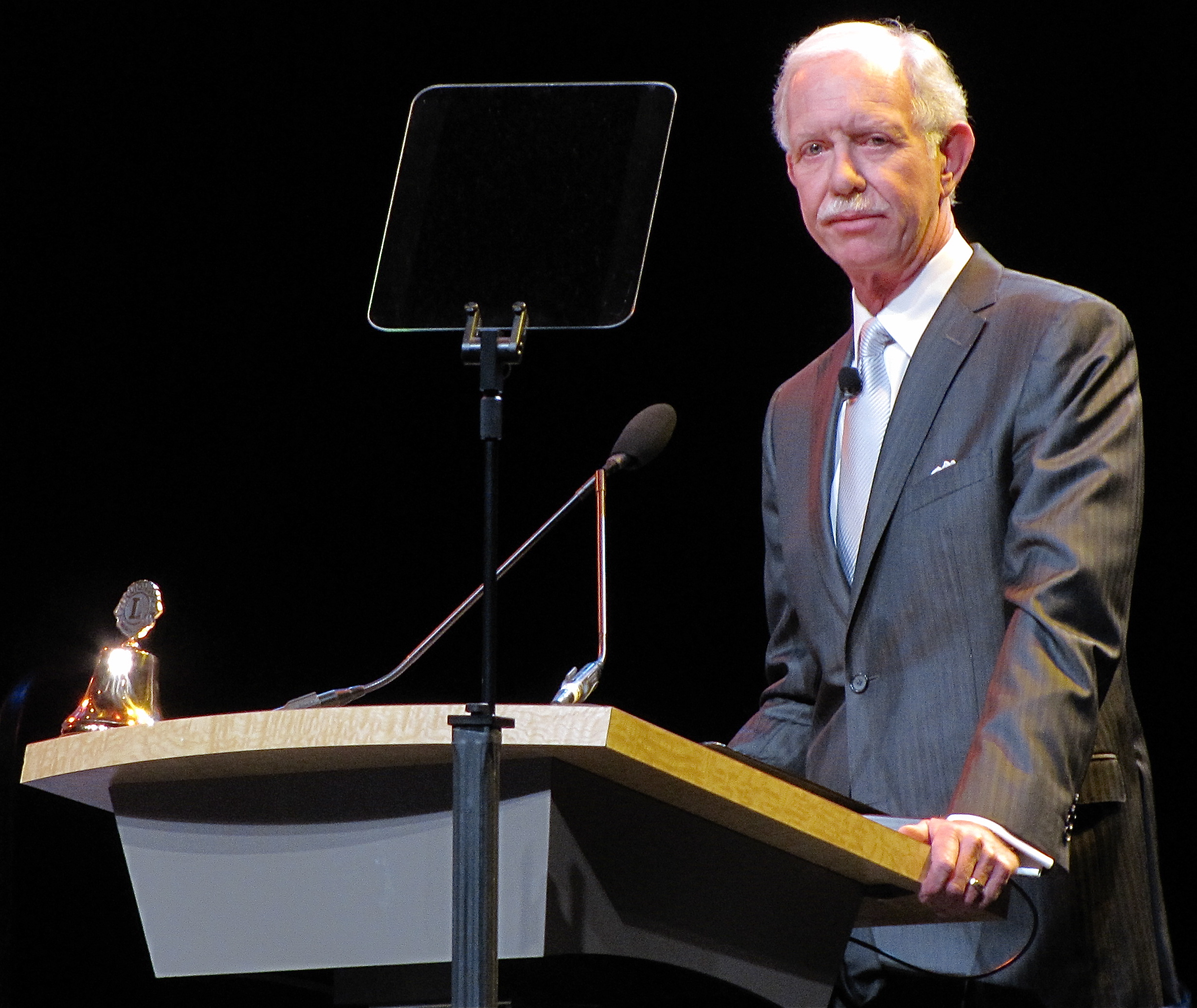
Sullenberger at the LIONS World Convention 2010 in Sydney

In 2010, Sullenberger retired after 30 years with US Airways and its predecessor. His final flight was US Airways Flight 1167 from Fort Lauderdale, Florida, to Charlotte, North Carolina, where he reunited with Skiles and a half dozen of the passengers on Flight 1549.

Sullenberger works as an international lecturer and keynote speaker at educational institutions, corporations, and non-profit organizations about the importance of aviation and passenger safety, high performance systems improvement, leadership and culture, risk and crisis management, lifelong preparation, and living a life of integrity. In 2011 he presented at the World Economic Forum in Davos and the Swiss Economic Forum.

He served as the 2010 Tournament of Roses Parade's grand marshal.

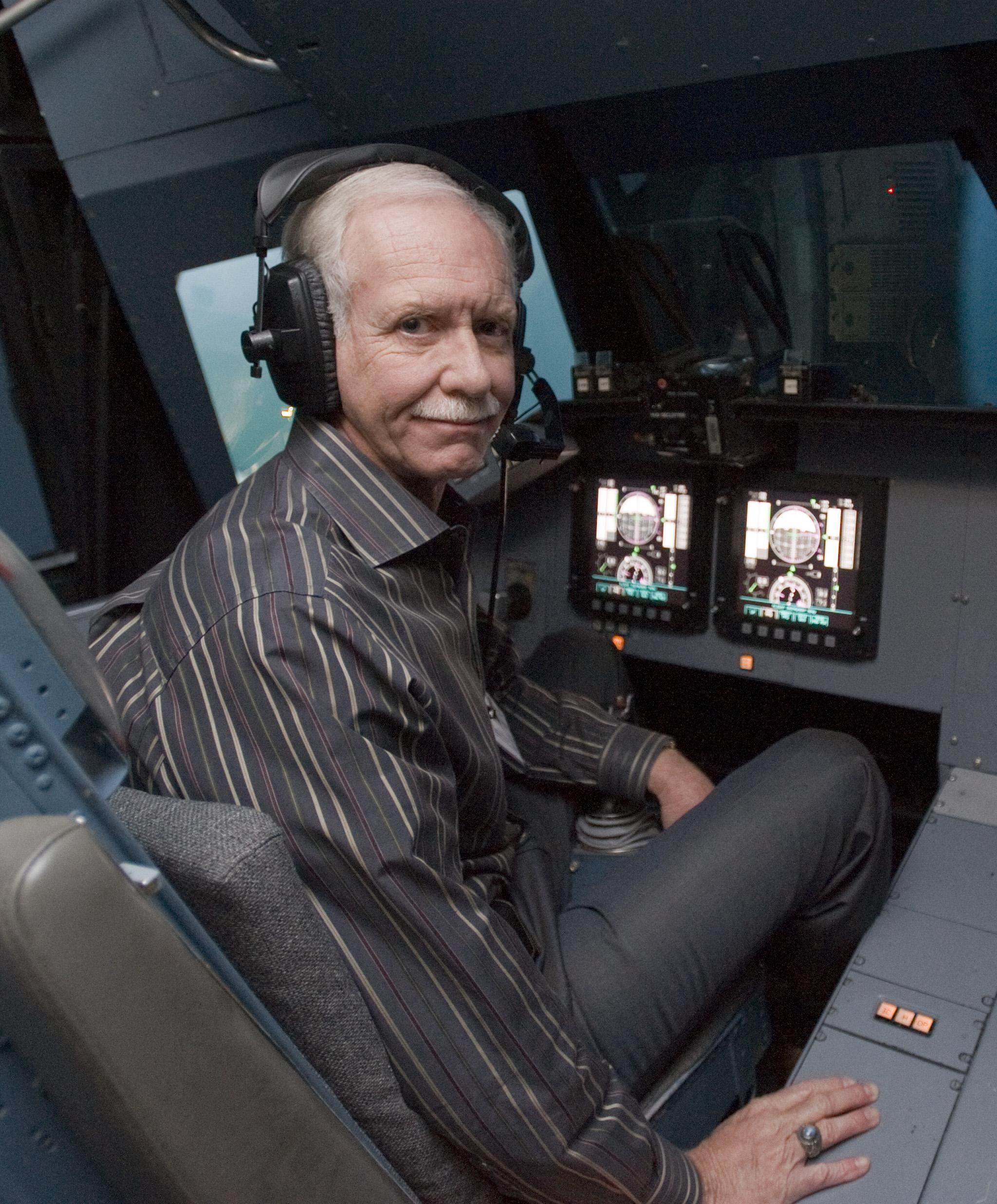
Sullenberger in NASA's Vertical Motion Simulator at the Ames Research Center, December 2011

In December 2010, Sullenberger was appointed an Officer of France's Legion of Honour.

He and the Flight 1549 crew received the Smithsonian National Air and Space Museum Trophy for Current Achievement in 2010.

With coauthor Jeffrey Zaslow, Sullenberger wrote the 2009 bestselling memoir Highest Duty: My Search for What Really Matters. In the book, Sullenberger also discussed personal matters, including his father's suicide in 1995, the Sullenbergers' struggle with infertility, and their decision to adopt.

In May 2011, CBS News hired Sullenberger as an aviation and safety expert.

From 2009 to 2013, Sullenberger and Skiles acted as the co-chairmen of the EAA's Young Eagles Program, which gives children the opportunity to experience flight and learn about general aviation. Since its inception, the program has flown over 2 million kids and is the most successful of its kind. Through their participation and service to aviation safety, Sullenberger and Skiles received the EAA Freedom of Flight Award in 2015.

Sullenberger's second book, Making a Difference: Stories of Vision and Courage from America's Leaders, was released on May 15, 2012.

In 2019 Sullenberger said that Boeing 737 MAX crashes "are demonstrable evidence that our current system of aircraft design and certification has failed us. These accidents should never have happened." He sharply criticized Boeing and the Federal Aviation Administration, saying that the overly "cozy relationship" between the aviation industry and government was evident in March 2019 when Boeing CEO Dennis Muilenburg lobbied President Donald Trump to prevent the 737 MAX 8 from being grounded.

=== Politics ===
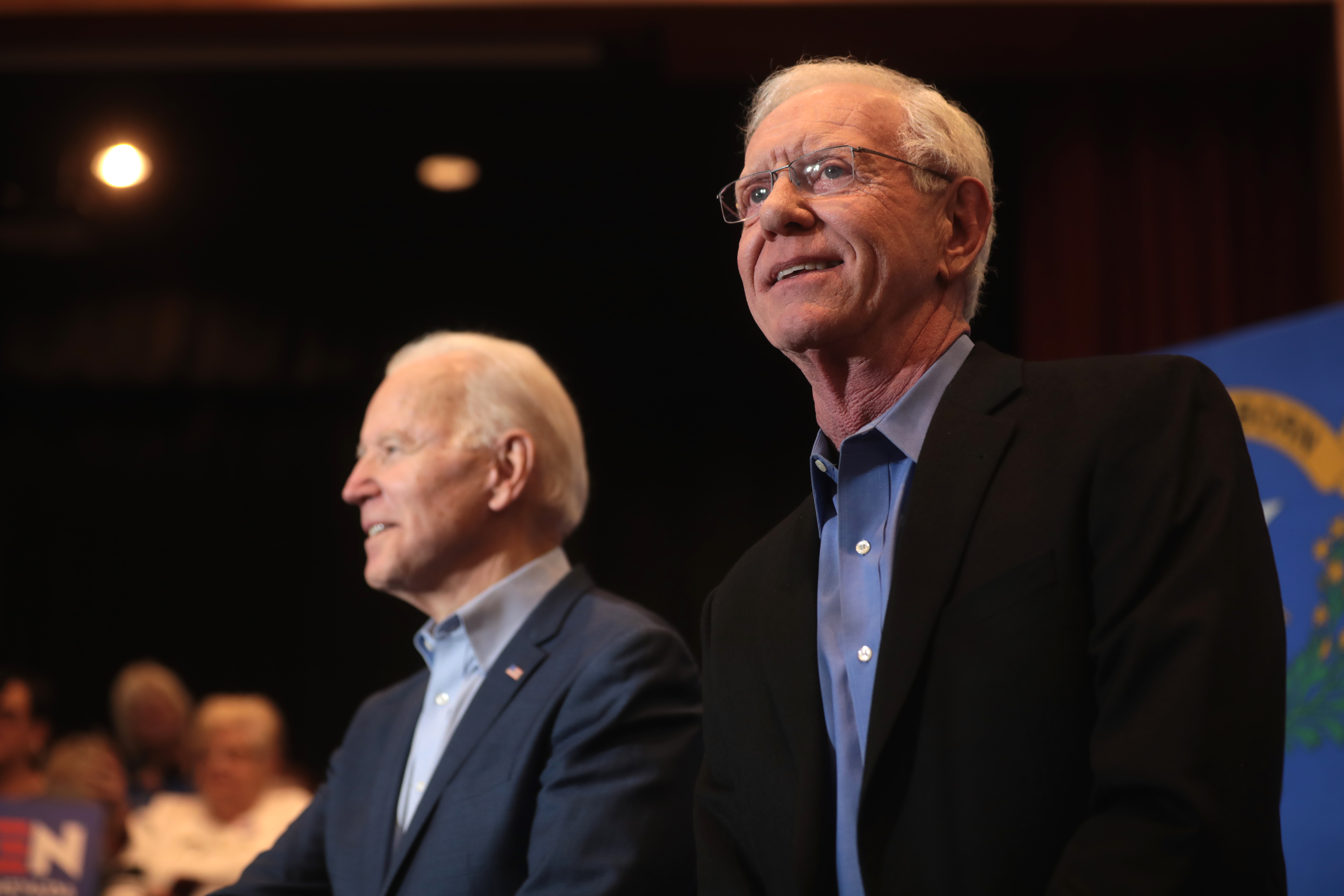
Sullenberger with Joe Biden at a rally in February 2020

In late October 2018, Sullenberger wrote an op-ed in The Washington Post ahead of the 2018 mid-term elections, calling on Americans to vote "for leaders who are committed to the values that will unite and protect us," who have a "moral compass ... competence, integrity, and concern for the greater good." In a subsequent interview with Lawrence O'Donnell, Sullenberger elaborated his position, discussing his belief that voters should act as a check and balance in a partisan government. He also wrote that he has been a registered Republican for the majority of his adult life but has "always voted as an American".

In February 2020, Sullenberger endorsed former U.S. Vice President Joe Biden for the presidency. In September 2020, he worked with Vote Vets and The Lincoln Project to create a commercial urging Americans to vote President Donald Trump out of office.

In 2025, Sullenberger criticised the appointment of Bryan Bedford as the administrator of the Federal Aviation Administration (FAA), stating that "Mr Bedford will not commit to the current 1500-hour pilot experience rule".

=== Ambassadorship ===
On June 15, 2021, President Biden nominated Sullenberger to be the U.S. representative to the Council of the International Civil Aviation Organization (ICAO), with the rank of ambassador. He was confirmed by the Senate via voice vote on December 2, 2021. He presented his credentials to ICAO Secretary General Juan Carlos Salazar Gómez on February 3, 2022, serving until July 1, 2022.

== Personal life ==
Sullenberger mentioned a "short, childless" first marriage in his memoir. He married fitness instructor Lorraine "Lorrie" Henry in 1989. They adopted two daughters, Kate and Kelly.

On December 7, 1995, Sullenberger's father died as a result of suicide by gunshot shortly after he was released from the hospital following major surgery. He had been suffering from depression and a long and difficult convalescence. As a result of this, Sullenberger became a suicide prevention activist, having promoted National Suicide Prevention Week and National Suicide Prevention Lifeline.

=== Health ===
In July 2026, Sullenberger disclosed that he had been diagnosed with Alzheimer's disease in August 2025.

== In popular culture ==
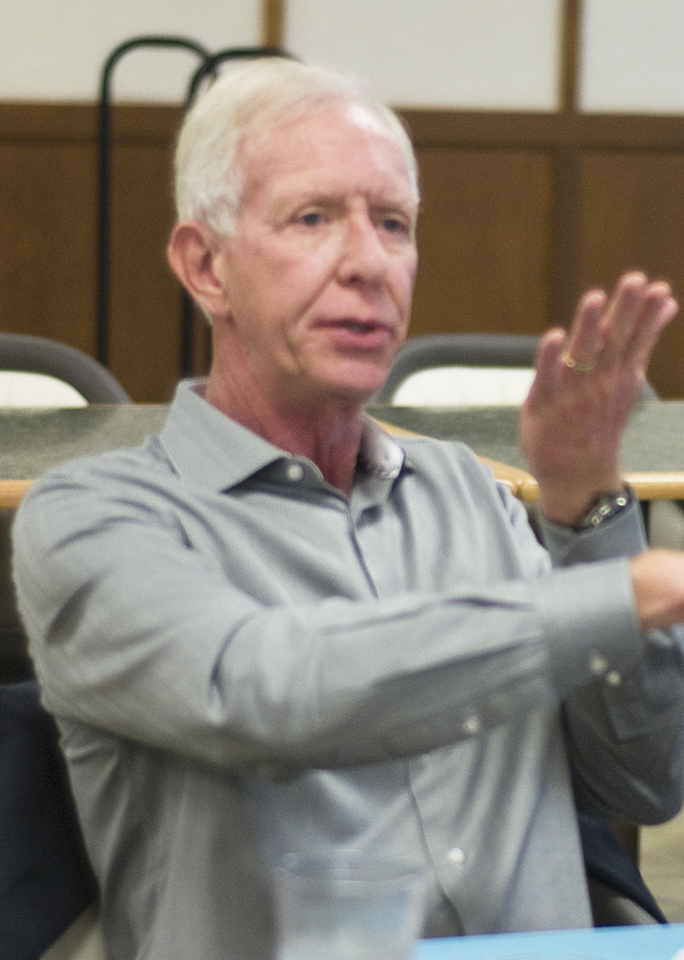
Sullenberger in 2014

Radio personality Garrison Keillor wrote "Pilot Song: The Ballad of Chesley Sullenberger III" for the January 17, 2009, edition of his radio variety show A Prairie Home Companion.

Sullenberger's speech before Congress concerning U.S. civil aviation is featured in Michael Moore's 2009 documentary Capitalism: A Love Story.

Sullenberger is referenced in the 2011 romantic comedy film Friends with Benefits. Throughout the film, Justin Timberlake's character repeatedly suggests to people he meets aboard planes that modern airplanes practically fly themselves, and that Sullenberger's feat was less impressive than it was portrayed, an idea for which he encounters incredulity and hostility. Mila Kunis's character is seen reading Sullenberger's English Wikipedia article.

The 2010 song "A Real Hero", by French electronica artist College and the band Electric Youth, is in part inspired by Captain Sullenberger and Flight 1549. Frontman Austin Garrick was inspired to write the song by his grandfather, whose reference to Sullenberger as "a real human being and a real hero" became the song's refrain.

In 2010, Stephen Colbert, Jon Stewart, and Steve Carell released a comedy record called Everybody's Talking 'Bout Sully.

"Hudson River Runway", the March 14, 2011, episode of the TV series Mayday, documents the events around Flight 1549's emergency landing and includes interviews with several of its real-life participants. Sullenberger was not interviewed, but was portrayed in reenactments by actor Christopher Britton.

Sullenberger is invited to the Smith household in season 7 of American Dad! He is featured In the episode The Unbrave One, Stan Smith using Sully as an example of a hero.

The 2016 Oscar-nominated dramatic feature film Sully was adapted from Sullenberger's memoir Highest Duty: My Search for What Really Matters. Directed by Clint Eastwood and starring Tom Hanks as Sullenberger and Aaron Eckhart as Skiles, it recreates the events around the Hudson River landing.

In 2016, Tom Hanks appeared in a sketch on Saturday Night Live where he reprised his character as "Sully" Sullenberger.

Sullenberger appeared as himself in a cameo role in the 2017 film Daddy's Home 2.

In season five, episode seven of the NBC comedy Brooklyn Nine-Nine titled "Two Turkeys," (aired November 21, 2017) the character Jake Peralta's (portrayed by Andy Samberg) father Roger Peralta (portrayed by Bradley Whitford), a pilot, claims to have flown with Sullenberger. Later on, the character Amy Santiago's (portrayed by Melissa Fumero) father Victor Santiago (portrayed by Jimmy Smits) drunkenly tells a nurse that Roger Peralta taught Sullenberger how to fly.

President George H. W. Bush's service dog Sully, who was assigned to Bush in June 2018 after the death of former First Lady Barbara Bush, was named after Sullenberger, and remained with the former president after Bush's November 2018 death, accompanying Bush's casket for its return to Washington, D.C.

Sullenberger is featured in the 2020 pilot of the Fox animated TV series Duncanville.

Sullenberger is featured in the 2021 Family Guy episode And Then There's Fraud. Quagmire buys a pilot's hat thinking it is Sullenberger's, having Sullenberger sign it at the end of the episode.

Sullenberger appeared in the 2022 documentary film Downfall: The Case Against Boeing.

In the second season of the ABC sitcom Abbott Elementary, episode 6 features teacher Gregory Eddie dressed up as Sullenberger for Halloween.

Comedian Nathan Fielder staged an absurdist recreation of Sullenberger's entire life, from infancy up to a simulated recreation of the N106US incident, starring himself as Sullenberger, as part of the second season of HBO's documentary comedy series The Rehearsal. The episode received two Primetime Emmy nominations.

== See also ==
- List of accidents and incidents involving commercial aircraft
- Living Legends of Aviation
- Tadeusz Wrona
- Tammie Jo Shults

Diplomatic posts
Preceded by Sean E. Doocey	United States Permanent Representative to the International Civil Aviation Organization; 2022	Vacant
