= Highest Duty =

2009 memoir

Highest Duty: My Search for What Really Matters
- Author: Chesley Sullenberger, Jeffrey Zaslow
- Language: English
- Genre: Memoir
- Publisher: William Morrow
- Publication date: October 13, 2009
- Publication place: United States
- Media type: Print (hardback & paperback)
- Pages: 352
- ISBN: 978-0-06-192468-2

Highest Duty: My Search for What Really Matters is a 2009 memoir written by Chesley Sullenberger and Jeffrey Zaslow describing the events of US Airways Flight 1549. The New York Times bestselling autobiography of Capt. Chesley "Sully" Sullenberger—the pilot who landed a crippled airliner in New York's Hudson River, saving the lives of the 155 passengers and crew—discusses leadership, responsibility, and service, along with his life story.

Kirkus Reviews described it as "valuable for anyone interested in how a life lived with integrity prepares a man for the ultimate challenge." A review in The Mercury News praised its "meticulous attention to white-knuckle detail".

Clint Eastwood directed a 2016 film adaptation called Sully that received positive reviews from critics.

Season 2, episode 3 of the hit TV show The Rehearsal features host Nathan Fielder recreating elements of Sullenberger's life from Highest Duty in order to understand how Sullenberger avoided crashing the plane, as part of Fielder's project to improve airline safety in general.
