= Sully (film) =

2016 film by Clint Eastwood

- Theatrical release poster
- Directed by: Clint Eastwood
- Written by: Todd Komarnicki
- Based on: Highest Duty by: Chesley "Sully" Sullenberger; Jeffrey Skiles
- Produced by: Clint Eastwood; Frank Marshall; Tim Moore; Allyn Stewart
- Starring: Tom Hanks; Aaron Eckhart; Laura Linney
- Cinematography: Tom Stern
- Edited by: Blu Murray
- Music by: Christian Jacob; The Tierney Sutton Band
- Production companies: Village Roadshow Pictures; Ratpac-Dune Entertainment; Flashlight Films; The Kennedy/Marshall Company; Malpaso Productions; Orange Corp
- Distributed by: Warner Bros. Pictures
- Release dates: September 2, 2016 (Telluride); September 9, 2016 (United States)
- Running time: 96 minutes
- Country: United States
- Language: English
- Budget: $60 million
- Box office: $240.8 million

Sully (also known as Sully: Miracle on the Hudson) is a 2016 American biographical disaster film directed by Clint Eastwood and written by Todd Komarnicki, based on the 2009 autobiography Highest Duty by Chesley "Sully" Sullenberger and Jeffrey Skiles. Tom Hanks stars as Sullenberger, with Aaron Eckhart as Jeffrey Skiles, and co-stars Laura Linney, Anna Gunn, Autumn Reeser, Holt McCallany, and Jamey Sheridan.

The film follows "Sully" Sullenberger's 2009 emergency landing of US Airways Flight 1549 on the Hudson River, in which all 155 passengers and crew survived, and the subsequent publicity and investigation.

Sully premiered at the 43rd Telluride Film Festival on September 2, 2016, and was released in the United States by Warner Bros. Pictures on September 9, 2016, in conventional and IMAX theaters. The film received generally positive reviews from critics and grossed over $240 million worldwide, but created controversy with its fictionalized portrayal of the National Transportation Safety Board (NTSB) as "prosecutorial and closed-minded." The American Film Institute and National Board of Review each selected it as one of their ten best films of 2016, and it was nominated for the Academy Award for Best Sound Editing at the 89th Academy Awards.

== Plot ==
On January 15, 2009, captain Chesley "Sully" Sullenberger and first officer Jeff Skiles take off in US Airways Flight 1549 from LaGuardia Airport. During climbout, the Airbus A320 strikes a flock of birds, damaging both engines. Without much time to think, they judge themselves as unable to reach nearby airports (Teterboro Airport being the closest), and Sully ditches the disabled plane onto the icy waters of the Hudson River.

Although some people suffer mild injuries, all 155 crew and passengers survive and evacuate successfully. Sully is heralded as a hero by the public and media for his unprecedented feat of aviation skill. However, he experiences aftereffects, and finds himself unable to escape the attention of the press, which is targeting not only him but also his family.

Still in New York City for investigation reasons, Sully learns that preliminary data from ACARS suggest that the left engine was still running at idle power. Theoretically, it still had enough power to land the plane at either LaGuardia or Teterboro. Furthermore, the National Transportation Safety Board (NTSB) claims that several confidential computerized simulations show similar results, even with the engine damage that Sullenberger and Skiles claim occurred. Sully and Jeff firmly insist otherwise, even though the NTSB says its results were confirmed with 20 different simulations. When the NTSB representatives adjourn the meeting, Sullenberger and Skiles discuss their bewilderment.

The NTSB suspects it may be a case of pilot error, which would likely destroy Sully's reputation and career. He arranges to have the simulations rerun with live pilots, then relayed to the public. They result in successful landings. Sully debates that the simulations are unrealistic because they do not take human factors into account, such as the element of surprise, the time required for analysis and decision-making, and the significantly higher stakes he and Jeff faced.

However, the simulation pilots knew in advance of the situation that they would face and of the suggested emergency action, were able to practice the scenario several times—successfully completing the simulation only after 17 previous failed attempts—had no passengers to think about, and were in no personal danger. The NTSB accepts his criticism, and the simulations are rerun with a 35-second pause before the plane is diverted. The LaGuardia rerun ends with the plane crash-landing short of the runway, and that to Teterboro with a crash into buildings before it can reach the airport.

After listening to the cockpit voice recorder of the real-life incident, NTSB announces that analysis of the left engine, now recovered from the river, confirms Sully's account that it had indeed been seriously damaged by the bird strike and concludes that Sully had acted correctly in the event. Sully credits everyone on board, the air traffic controllers, the ferry crews, and the emergency response teams for the success. When asked if he would change anything if he did it all over again, Jeff jokes that he would have ditched the plane in July if he were to do it again, to everyone's amusement.

== Cast ==
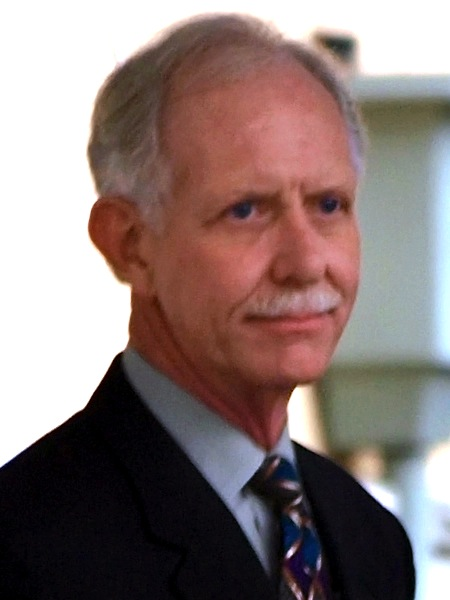
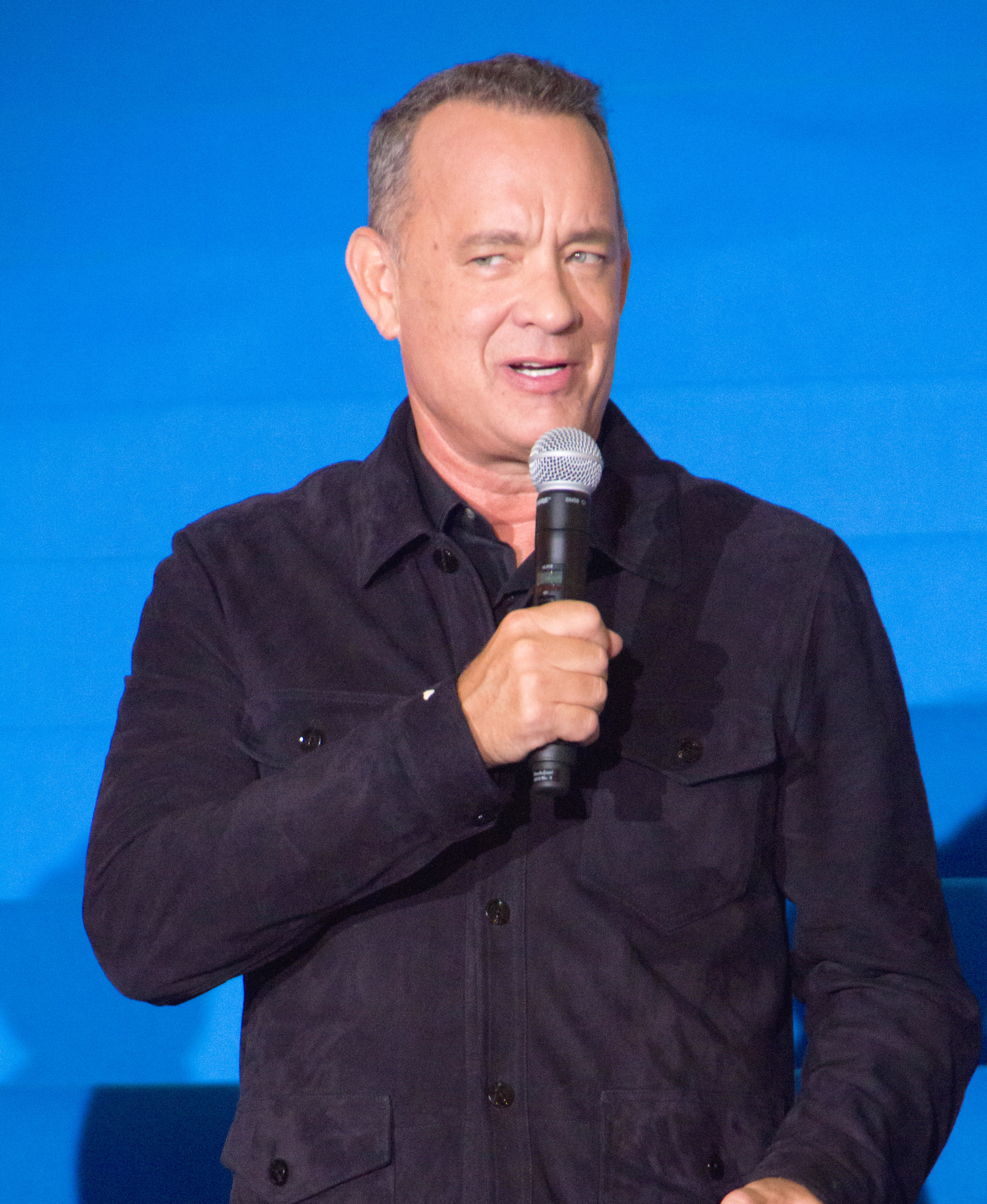
Chesley "Sully" Sullenberger (left) portrayed by Tom Hanks (right)
- Tom Hanks as Chesley "Sully" Sullenberger
  - Blake Jones as Sullenberger at 16 years old
- Aaron Eckhart as Jeff Skiles
- Laura Linney as Lorraine Sullenberger
- Mike O'Malley as Charles Porter
- Anna Gunn as Dr. Elizabeth Davis
- Jamey Sheridan as Ben Edwards
- Ann Cusack as Donna Dent
- Jane Gabbert as Sheila Dail
- Molly Hagan as Doreen Welsh
- Holt McCallany as Mike Cleary
- Chris Bauer as Larry Rooney
- Patch Darragh as Patrick Harten
- Autumn Reeser as Tess Sosa
- Rob Treveiler as ATC Supervisor
- Jerry Ferrara as Michael Delaney
- Max Adler as Jimmy Stefanik
- Sam Huntington as Jeff Kolodjay
- Michael Rapaport as Pete the Bartender
- Wayne Bastrup as Brian Kelly
- Valerie Mahaffey as Diane Higgins
- Jeff Kober as L. T. Cook
- Molly Bernard as Alison
- Jeffrey Nordling as Barry Leonard

Vince Lombardi, the captain of the first ferry to reach the downed plane, appears as himself. Katie Couric also appears as herself. David Letterman appears via archive footage from the night he interviewed the real crew of Flight 1549 who are digitally swapped with their film counterparts.

Actor Shane P. Allen was cast for his likeness as Discovery Channel CEO Billy Campbell. He and eight others were featured in the film, and had their own body doubles for safety.

During the credits, the real Sully and his wife Lorrie give a short speech to the actual passengers who were on the plane.

== Production ==
=== Development ===
The film is based on Sully's autobiography Highest Duty, the rights to which were optioned by producers Frank Marshall and Allyn Stewart in 2010. They developed the screenplay with Stewart's partner executive producer Kipp Nelson, hiring screenwriter Todd Komarnicki. From the start, Sullenberger wanted the film to encompass "that sense of our common humanity", noting that the incident had taken place shortly after the 2008 Great Recession. He explains: "People were wondering if everything was about self-interest and greed. They were doubting human nature. Then all these people acted together, selflessly, to get something really important done. In a way, I think it gave everyone a chance to have hope, at a time when we all needed it." Komarnicki said the difficulty was not depicting the landing in the river, but the investigation afterwards: "It wasn't really a challenge of what to do with the event since that is the thing everyone knows about, it was more about how you parse out the information about the man slowly falling apart and becoming a hero in the eyes of the world when internally and with the investigators it was actually seemingly going the other way."

=== Casting ===
By June 2015, it was reported that Tom Hanks was already in talks to play the lead role of Sullenberger. Much of the rest of the cast was announced in August (with Aaron Eckhart, Laura Linney, Holt McCallany, and Jamey Sheridan joining), September (Jerry Ferarra), and October (Max Adler, Sam Huntington, and Wayne Bastrup).

=== Filming ===
Principal photography on the film began on September 28, 2015, in New York City. On October 15, filming started in Atlanta, where a building in downtown Atlanta was transformed into a New York hotel. Most of the film's budget was spent in Los Angeles, where the crash sequence and water evacuation scenes were filmed at Warner Bros. Studios and Universal Studios Hollywood. Filming also took place in North Carolina; Holloman Air Force Base, New Mexico; and Kearny, New Jersey and concluded on November 25, 2015. The film was shot almost entirely with Arri Alexa IMAX cameras. The film was initially going to be framed for IMAX 1.90:1 and protected for 2.39:1, but by the second day of filming, Eastwood said that they were shooting a movie in IMAX and decided to frame for IMAX. However, the film was released in 2.39 in standard theaters and 1.90 in IMAX. The aviation mock-up/props and effects were supplied by Scroggins Aviation Mockup & Effects. They used three retired decommissioned airplanes (Aircraft Mock-up/Props) during the making of the film.

== Release ==
Sully premiered at the 43rd Telluride Film Festival on September 2, 2016, and was released in the United States in conventional and IMAX theaters on September 9 by Warner Bros. Pictures. When deciding when to release the film, Warner Bros. executives had begun circling the first weekend after Labor Day, considering that most adult fall dramas do not begin opening until September or October. However, this meant that the release coincided with the 15th anniversary of the September 11 attacks, which made executives wary as the film contains a dream sequence in which the plane crashes into Manhattan skyscrapers. But Warner Bros. domestic distribution chief Jeff Goldstein and his team nevertheless decided to release at that time because "Sully is a story of hope and a real hero who did his job." However, according to Komarnicki, the release date was coincidental rather than planned, and he attributed it to box-office logistics, principally the limited availability of IMAX screens during the summer and at Christmas time.

=== Home media ===
Sully was released by Warner Home Video on Digital HD on December 6, 2016, with a subsequent Blu-ray, DVD release on December 20, 2016.

Despite being shot, almost entirely, with IMAX cameras and released in IMAX theaters in the 1.90:1 aspect ratio, the home media release did not include the film in that aspect ratio, instead including a cropped 2.39:1 aspect ratio that was used for non-IMAX screenings.

=== Screening on airplanes ===
Several major airlines, including American Airlines and British Airways, did not include the movie in their onboard entertainment, since it could upset viewers. Virgin Atlantic allowed it, "to celebrate the fantastic skills, training and dedication of airline pilots".

== Reception ==
=== Box office ===
Sully grossed $125.1 million in the United States and Canada and $115.7 million in other countries for a worldwide total of $240.8 million, against a production budget of $60 million. It broke the September record for biggest global IMAX opening for a 2D film with $5.1 million from 523 IMAX screens, eclipsing the previous record held by The Maze Runner ($4.2 million in 2014). In total it had grossed $10 million in IMAX plays globally.

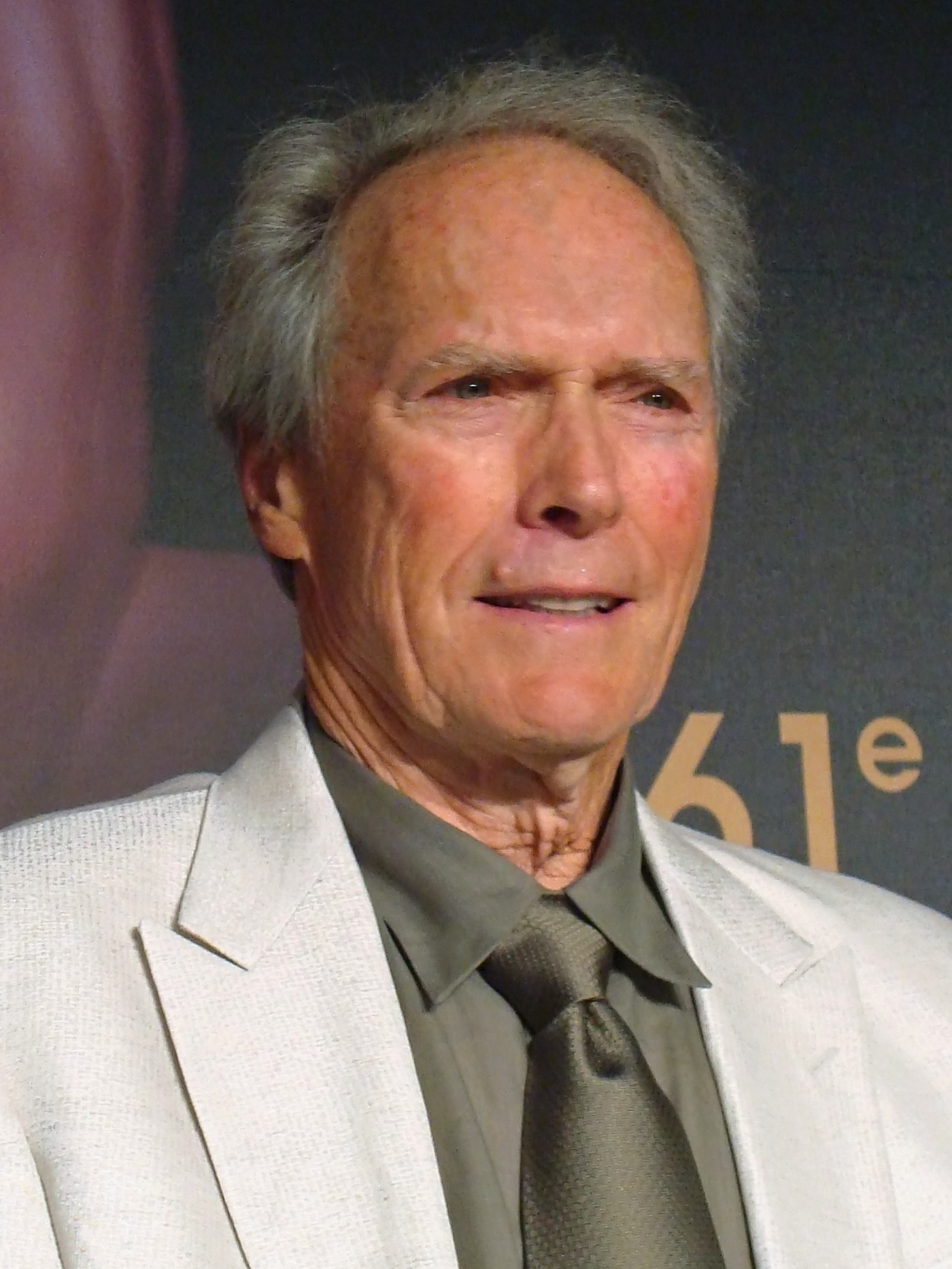
Sully recorded the second biggest debut for Clint Eastwood's career in North America.

==== United States and Canada ====
In the United States and Canada, Sully was released on Friday, September 9, 2016, across 3,525 theaters, of which 375 were in IMAX, and was initially projected to make $25 million on its opening weekend, with Box Office Mojo projecting $31 million due to its large theater count and positioning. Box office trackers were expecting Sully to launch in the same range as Hanks's 2013 hostage drama Captain Phillips, which opened with $25.7 million, and the 2012 airline drama Flight at $24.9 million. The weekend after Labor Day has historically been a lackluster period for film revenues, although Deadline Hollywood noted that this doesn't apply to the "more intriguing titles". Sully was one of four wide releases of that weekend. According to ticket-selling Web site Fandango, it outsold Hanks' previous film, Bridge of Spies in advance ticket sales. It earned $1.35 million from Thursday previews at 2,700 theaters, which marked the biggest of Hanks's career, and was considered strong by Box Office Mojo given that it coincided with the first NFL game of the season.

On its opening day it made $12.2 million, including Thursday previews, of which $1.3 million came from IMAX. It is the second-biggest Friday ever for a wide Eastwood opening, trailing behind only the $30 million opening day of American Sniper. In total, it grossed $35 million from its opening weekend, which is one of the top five September openings of all time (or twelfth adjusted for inflation). The debut is the second-biggest wide release opening for an Eastwood movie, behind the $89 million of American Sniper, and Hanks's third-biggest live-action debut behind The Da Vinci Code ($77 million in 2006) and Angels & Demons ($46 million in 2009). It also performed exceptionally well in IMAX, having been shot entirely in that format: for the weekend alone, it brought in a record $4 million from 375 auditoriums, being 11% of the total gross. This broke the previous September weekend record held by The Equalizer of $3.1 million in 2014.

The film continued to dominate the box office, with only a modest decline of 36% to post $21.6 million in its second weekend, despite competition from three new wide releases: Blair Witch, Bridget Jones's Baby and Snowden. It finally lost the top spot in its third weekend, after the releases of The Magnificent Seven and Storks.

Warner Bros. and Village Roadshow were thrilled by these results, as were theater owners, particularly as September tends to see a fall in box offices as schools re-open and new TV shows are marketed. Scott Mendelson of Forbes magazine suggested that the film had potential to surpass $100 million, since Tom Hanks's films tend to be "leggy" and post big multiples, and Sully is aimed at older audiences who don't usually go to the opening weekend. Deadline Hollywood pointed out that the marketing effort had been key to the robust opening (as well as good reviews and positive word of mouth), despite the absence of both Eastwood and Hanks on social media. The film was released on the 15th anniversary of the infamous September 11 attacks, but Warner Bros.' domestic distribution chief Jeff Goldstein said that the anniversary did not post a big – either negative or positive – impact on the film. According to a comScore audience survey, 82% of the moviegoers were older than 25, 80% above 35, and women comprised 56% of the opening weekend. 39% said Hanks was their principal reason for seeing it.

==== Other countries ====
The film opened across 39 countries simultaneously with America and grossed an estimated $10.5 million from about 3,600 screens. IMAX comprised $1.1 million of that from 148 IMAX screens. It scored the biggest opening of any Eastwood film in Russia with $1 million (although it was No. 3 for the weekend behind Ben-Hur and Sausage Party), in the UAE with $1 million, and it was the second biggest in Australia with $2.4 million, where it had the advantage of opening on Father's Day. It was released in Hong Kong during the Mid-Autumn Festival, delivering first place at the box office with $777,000. In Japan, it scored the third biggest opening for Eastwood with $2.3 million, behind American Sniper and Letters from Iwo Jima. Variety predicted it would end its run there with around $15 million. In Brazil, after the aircraft disaster involving the football team Chapecoense, Warner Bros ordered the delaying of the release from December 1 to December 15. The film was released in China during a crowded period (December 9), but managed to score an opening weekend worth $5.5 million from about 5,000 screens.

Outside North America, the biggest markets have been Japan ($13.2 million), Australia ($9.9 million), the United Kingdom ($5.4 million), and Italy ($5.1 million).

=== Critical response ===
On Rotten Tomatoes, the film has an approval rating of 85% based on 346 reviews, with an average rating of 7.20/10. The website's critical consensus reads, "As comfortingly workmanlike as its protagonist, Sully makes solid use of typically superlative work from its star and director to deliver a quietly stirring tribute to an everyday hero." On Metacritic, the film has a weighted average score of 74 out of 100, based on 46 critics, indicating "generally favorable reviews". Audiences polled by CinemaScore gave the film an average grade of "A" on an A+ to F scale, while those at PostTrak gave it a 90% positive score, with 72% saying they would definitely recommend it. 48% said they went to see the film due to interest on Flight 1549's story, while 40% went because of Hanks.

Peter Debruge of Variety gave a positive review, praising Hanks and saying, "This is Hanks' show, and he delivers a typically strong performance, quickly allowing us to forget that we're watching an actor. With his snowy white hair and moustache to match, Hanks conveys a man confident in his abilities, yet humble in his actions, which could also be said of Eastwood as a director." IGN reviewer Simon Thompson awarded 9/10, writing: "Sully is a beautifully balanced, classily nuanced and hugely engaging film that avoids all the clichéd pitfalls it could have slipped into. Tom Hanks gives one of the best performances of his career and Clint Eastwood's direction is beautiful and rich. It's not just a great movie, Sully is one of the best pieces of cinema that a major Hollywood studio has released this year." Manohla Dargis of The New York Times praised both the film and Eastwood's direction, saying it is "economical and solid, and generally low-key when it's not freaking you out".

Todd McCarthy of The Hollywood Reporter called it "[A] vigorous and involving salute to professionalism and being good at your job". Peter Travers of Rolling Stone gave 3.5 out of 4 stars and wrote, "the movie earns your attention and respect by digging deep, by finding the fear and self-doubt inside a man who'd never accept being defined as a hero. It's an eye-opener." Richard Roeper of the Chicago Sun-Times awarded it 4 out of 4 stars, praising the film as "an absolute triumph" and saying that Hanks "delivers another in a long line of memorable, nomination-worthy performances."

In an adverse review, John Anderson of Time wrote, "Inevitable is how Sully feels. That, and a little soggy, given that the storyline is rooted not in the few seconds of Sullenberger's defining act of heroism, but in the way his conscience, and the National Transportation Safety Board, plagued him in its aftermath."

=== NTSB depiction controversy ===
The film generated controversy for its depiction of the National Transportation Safety Board as antagonistic to the pilots. In a promotional video preceding the release, Eastwood claimed that the NTSB had "railroaded" Sullenberger by "trying to paint the picture that he had done the wrong thing." After the film's release, NTSB investigators objected to their portrayal. Christine Negroni wrote in The New York Times that "the film's version of the inquiry veers from the official record in both tone and substance," depicting the investigators as "departing from standard protocol in airline accident inquiries" and instead fictionalizing them as "prosecutorial and closed-minded." NTSB lead investigator Robert Benzon further disputed the film's depiction, saying that investigators "weren't out to embarrass anybody at all," while a former NTSB investigator expressed concern that moviegoers would take it as evidence of "government incompetence".

While the film depicts NTSB members presenting flight simulations showing that the plane could have been landed at an airport, in the actual public hearing, Benzon stated: "These flight simulations revealed that a successful return to LaGuardia or a diversion to Teterboro Airport was not assured". After the film was released, Benzon said:

I do not know why the writer and director chose to twist the role of the NTSB into such an inaccurate depiction. Their treatment of the NTSB went very far beyond cinematic license into simple mean-spirited dishonesty. The movie may actually be detrimental to aviation safety. Pilots involved in accidents will now expect harsh, unfair treatment by investigators.

Hanks told the Associated Press that Sullenberger was also disturbed by the fictionalized version, having reviewed an early draft of the script, going so far as to ask that the NTSB investigators' real names be removed from the characters. According to Hanks, Sullenberger felt that the real-life investigators "were not prosecutors" and it was not fair to associate them with changes in the story to depict "more of a prosecutorial process."

=== Accolades ===
Award	Date of ceremony	Category	Recipient(s) and nominee(s)	Result	Ref.
AARP Annual Movies for Grownups Awards	February 6, 2017	Best Picture	Sully	Nominated	
AARP Annual Movies for Grownups Awards	February 6, 2017	Best Director	Clint Eastwood	Nominated	
AARP Annual Movies for Grownups Awards	February 6, 2017	Best Actor	Tom Hanks	Nominated	
Academy Awards	February 26, 2017	Best Sound Editing	Bub Asman and Alan Robert Murray	Nominated	
Alliance of Women Film Journalists	December 21, 2016	Best Actor	Tom Hanks	Nominated	
Cinema Audio Society Awards	February 18, 2017	Outstanding Achievement in Sound Mixing for a Motion Picture – Live Action	James Ashwill, Bobby Fernandez, Jose Antonio Garcia, Thomas J. O'Connell, Tom Ozanich and John Reitz	Nominated	
Critics' Choice Awards	December 11, 2016	Best Picture	Sully	Nominated	
Critics' Choice Awards	December 11, 2016	Best Actor	Tom Hanks	Nominated	
Critics' Choice Awards	December 11, 2016	Best Adapted Screenplay	Todd Komarnicki	Nominated	
Critics' Choice Awards	December 11, 2016	Best Editing	Blu Murray	Nominated	
Dallas–Fort Worth Film Critics Association	December 13, 2016	Best Actor	Tom Hanks	5th Place	
Hollywood Film Awards	November 6, 2016	Hollywood Actor Award	Tom Hanks	Won	
Japan Academy Film Prize	March 3, 2017	Outstanding Foreign Language Film	Sully	Won	
Make-Up Artists and Hair Stylists Guild	February 19, 2017	Feature-Length Motion Picture – Contemporary Hair Styling	Patricia Dehaney and Jose Zamora	Nominated	
MPSE Golden Reel Awards	February 19, 2017	Feature English Language: Dialogue/ADR	Bub Asman, Alan Robert Murray, Hugo Weng and Katy Wood	Nominated	
Palm Springs International Film Festival	January 2, 2017	Icon Award	Tom Hanks	Won	
People's Choice Awards	January 18, 2017	Favorite Dramatic Movie	Sully	Nominated	
People's Choice Awards	January 18, 2017	Favorite Dramatic Movie Actor	Tom Hanks	Won	
San Diego Film Critics Society	December 12, 2016	Best Editing	Blu Murray	Won	
San Francisco Film Critics Circle	December 11, 2016	Best Actor	Tom Hanks	Nominated	
Satellite Awards	February 19, 2017	Best Actor	Tom Hanks	Nominated	
Satellite Awards	February 19, 2017	Best Adapted Screenplay	Todd Komarnicki	Nominated	
Satellite Awards	February 19, 2017	Best Visual Effects	Sully	Nominated	
Society of Operating Cameramen	February 11, 2017	Camera Operator of the Year – Film	Stephen Campanelli	Nominated	
St. Louis Film Critics Association	December 18, 2016	Best Actor	Tom Hanks	Nominated	
Visual Effects Society Awards	February 7, 2017	Outstanding Supporting Visual Effects in a Photoreal Feature	Mark Curtis, Tyler Kehl, Bryan Litson, Michael Owens and Steven Riley	Nominated	
Washington D.C. Area Film Critics Association	December 5, 2016	Best Editing	Blu Murray	Nominated	
