= US Airways Flight 1549 =

2009 aviation accident in New York

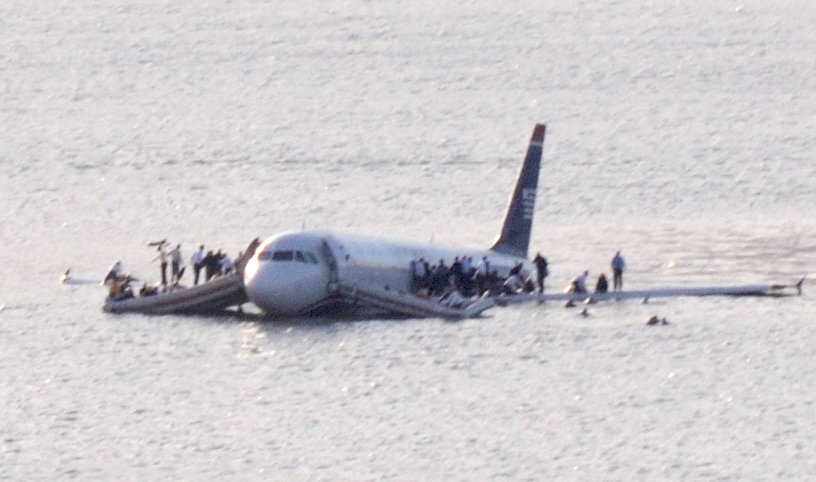
- US Airways Flight 1549 made an emergency landing floating on the Hudson River and was safely evacuated.

Accident
- Date: January 15, 2009
- Summary: Ditched following bird strike and dual-engine failure
- Site: Hudson River, New York City, New York, United States; 40.7695°N 74.0046°W

Aircraft
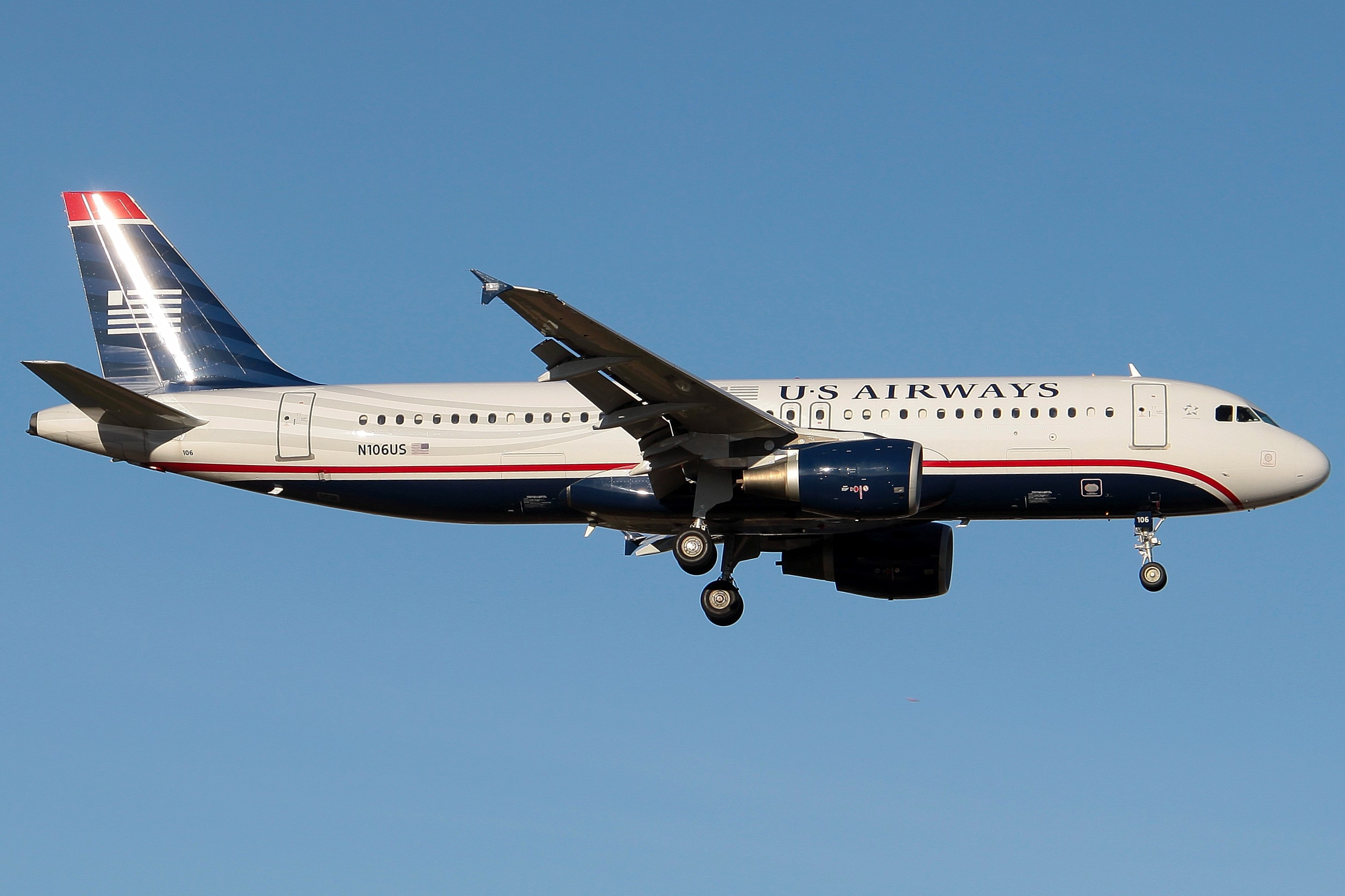
- N106US, the aircraft involved in the accident, seen in 2008
- Aircraft type: Airbus A320-214
- Operator: US Airways
- IATA flight No.: US1549
- ICAO flight No.: AWE1549
- Call sign: CACTUS 1549
- Registration: N106US
- Flight origin: LaGuardia Airport, New York City, United States
- Stopover: Charlotte Douglas International Airport, Charlotte, North Carolina
- Destination: Seattle-Tacoma International Airport, Seattle
- Occupants: 155
- Passengers: 150
- Crew: 5
- Fatalities: 0
- Injuries: 100
- Survivors: 155

US Airways Flight 1549 was a regularly scheduled US Airways domestic flight from New York City's LaGuardia Airport to Charlotte and Seattle, that ditched in the Hudson River shortly after takeoff on January 15, 2009, due to a double engine failure caused by a bird strike. The Airbus A320 operating the flight, registered N106US, struck a flock of Canada geese shortly after takeoff from LaGuardia, resulting in a dual engine failure. Given their position in relation to the available airports and their low altitude, pilots Chesley "Sully" Sullenberger and Jeffrey Skiles decided to glide the aircraft into a water landing on the Hudson River near Midtown Manhattan, doing so without significant damage to the aircraft. All 155 people on board survived and were rescued by nearby boats, although 100 people were injured, 5 seriously. The time from the bird strike to the ditching was less than four minutes.

The then-governor of New York State, David Paterson, called the incident a "Miracle on the Hudson" and a National Transportation Safety Board (NTSB) official described it as "the most successful ditching in aviation history". Flight simulations showed that the aircraft could have returned to LaGuardia, had it turned toward the airport immediately after the bird strike. The NTSB however, found that the scenario did not account for real-world considerations, and affirmed ditching as providing the highest probability of survival, given the circumstances. The pilots and flight attendants were awarded the Master's Medal of the Guild of Air Pilots and Air Navigators in recognition of their "heroic and unique aviation achievement".

== Background ==
The aircraft, N106US, was an Airbus A320-214 built in 1999 in Toulouse, France for US Airways. Its first flight was on June 15, 1999, and was delivered to US Airways one month later. It was powered by two CFM International CFM56-5B4/P turbofan engines. (Note: The aircraft, registered as N106US, was manufactured in 1999. The aircraft was delivered to US Airways in August 1999. At the time of the accident, its airframe had logged 16,299 flights totaling 25,241 flight hours; and the engines 19,182 and 26,466 hours. The last "A Check" (performed every 550 flight hours) was passed on December 6, 2008, and the last C Check (annual comprehensive inspection) on April 19, 2008.)

On January 15, 2009, US Airways Flight 1549 (Note: AWE1549, also designated under a Star Alliance codeshare agreement as United Airlines Flight 1919 (UA1919).) with call sign "CACTUS 1549" was scheduled to fly from New York City's LaGuardia Airport (LGA) to Seattle–Tacoma International Airport (SEA), with a planned intermediate stop at Charlotte Douglas International Airport (CLT) in Charlotte, North Carolina.

The pilot in command was 57-year-old Captain Chesley "Sully" Sullenberger, a former fighter pilot who had been an airline pilot since leaving the United States Air Force in 1980. At the time, he had logged 19,663 total flight hours, including 4,765 in an A320; he was also a glider pilot and expert on aviation safety. The second in command (co-pilot) was 49-year-old First Officer Jeffrey Skiles, who had accrued 15,643 career flight hours, including 37 in an A320, but this was his first assignment as pilot flying in an A320. There were 150 passengers and 3 flight attendants—Sheila Dail, Donna Dent and Doreen Welsh—on board.

== Accident ==
=== Takeoff and bird strike ===
New York TRACON audio
Air traffic control audio from about time of bird strike until ditching

The flight was cleared for takeoff to the northeast from LaGuardia's Runway 4 at 15:24:56 Eastern Standard Time (20:24:56 UTC). With Skiles in control, the crew made its first report after becoming airborne at 15:25:51 as being at 700 feet (210 m) and climbing.

The weather at 14:51 was 10 miles (16 km) visibility with broken clouds at 3,700 feet (1,100 m), wind 8 knots (9 mph; 15 km/h) from 290°; an hour later it was few clouds at 4,200 feet (1,300 m), wind 9 knots (10 mph; 17 km/h) from 310°. At 15:26:37, Sullenberger remarked to Skiles, "What a view of the Hudson today."

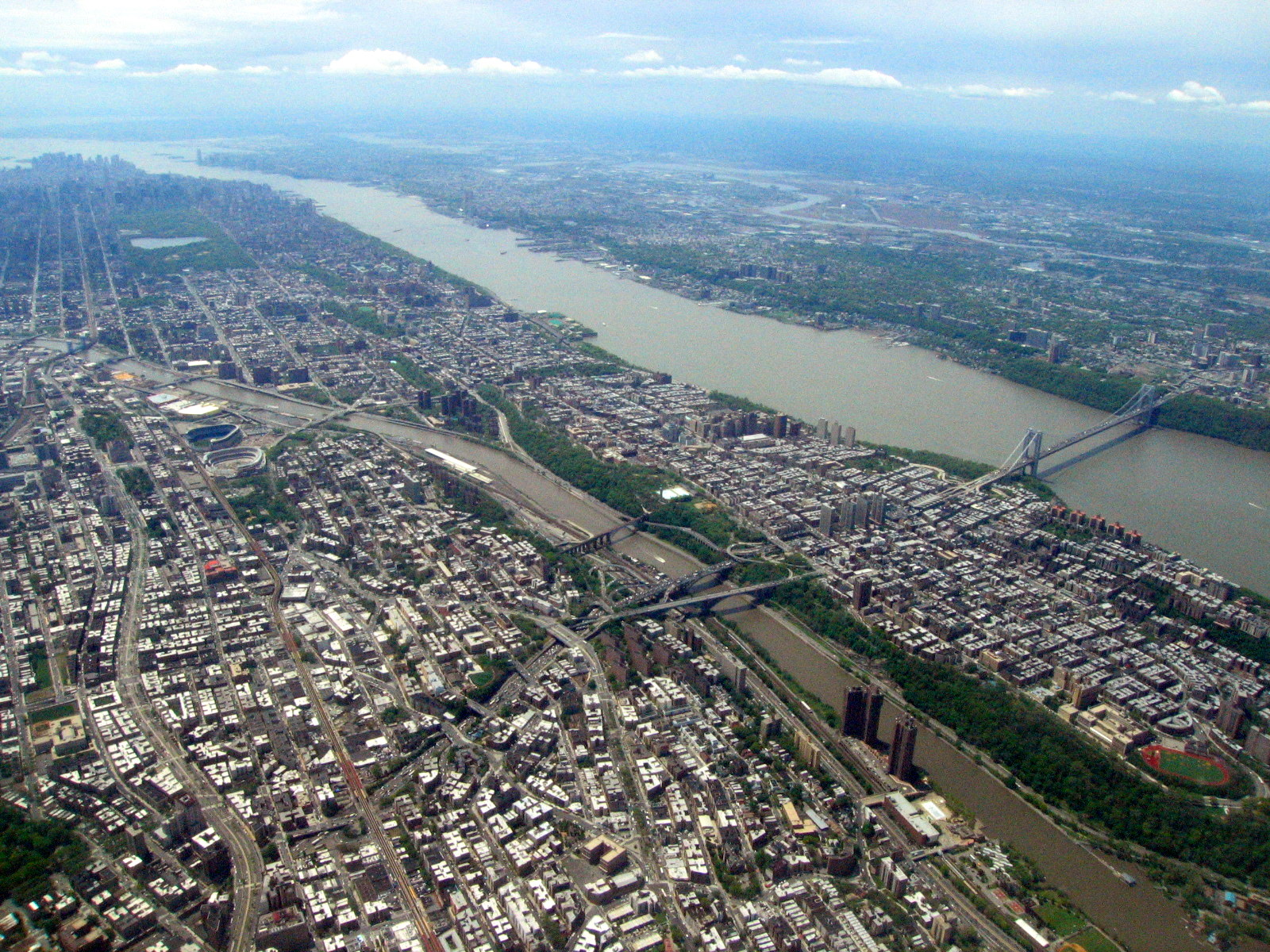
The Hudson River from above the Bronx, with Manhattan in the diagonal center and New Jersey in the distance. The George Washington Bridge is at right, Central Park Reservoir at upper left, and Teterboro Airport at the right center within the elbow of the Overpeck Creek.

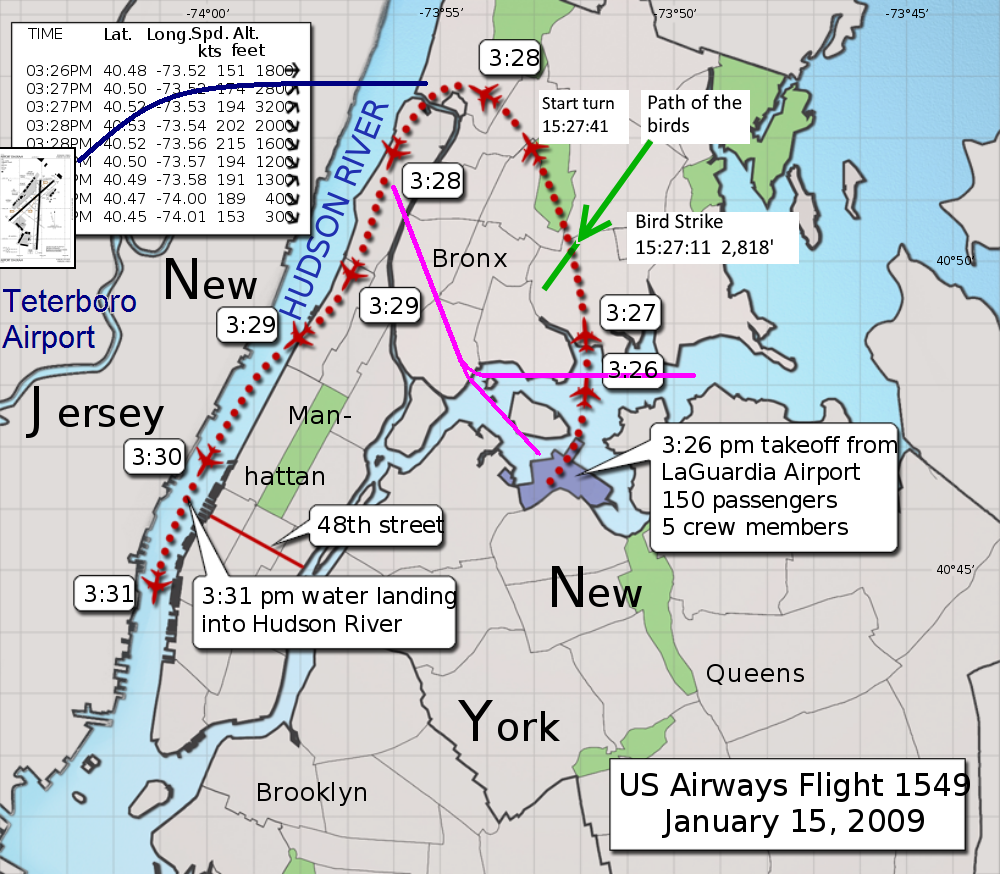
Flight path flown (red). Alternative trajectories to Teterboro (dark blue) and back toward La Guardia (magenta) were simulated for the investigation.

At 15:27:11, during climbout, the plane struck a flock of Canada geese at an altitude of 2,818 feet (859 m) about 4.5 miles (7.2 km) north-northwest of LaGuardia. The pilots' view was filled with the large birds; passengers and crew heard very loud bangs and saw flames from the engines, followed by silence and an odor of fuel.

Realizing that both engines had shut down, Sullenberger took control while Skiles worked the checklist for engine restart. (Note: The engines are the primary source of electrical and hydraulic power for the aircraft flight control systems, but an auxiliary power unit (APU) can provide backup electrical power, and a ram air turbine (RAT) can be deployed into the airstream to provide backup hydraulic pressure and electrical power at certain speeds. Both the APU and RAT were operating as the plane descended onto the river.) The aircraft slowed but continued to climb for a further 19 seconds, reaching about 3,060 feet (930 m) at an airspeed of about 185 knots (213 mph; 343 km/h), then began a glide descent, accelerating to 210 knots (240 mph; 390 km/h) at 15:28:10 as it descended through 1,650 feet (500 m).

At 15:27:33, Sullenberger radioed a mayday call to New York Terminal Radar Approach Control (TRACON): "[...] this is Cactus fifteen thirty nine [sic] (Note: Captain Sullenberger inadvertently spoke the wrong call sign here, the correct flight number having been 1549.)— [we've] hit birds. We've lost thrust on both engines. We're turning back towards LaGuardia". Air traffic controller Patrick Harten told LaGuardia's tower to hold all departures, and directed Sullenberger back to Runway 13. Sullenberger responded, "Unable".

Sullenberger asked controllers for landing options in New Jersey, mentioning Teterboro Airport. Permission was given for Teterboro's Runway 1, Sullenberger initially responded, "Yes", but then replied, "We can't do it [...] we're gonna be in the Hudson." The aircraft passed less than 900 feet (270 m) above the George Washington Bridge. Sullenberger commanded over the cabin address system to "brace for impact" and the flight attendants relayed the command to passengers. Meanwhile, air traffic controllers asked the Coast Guard to caution vessels in the Hudson and ask them to prepare to help with the rescue.

=== Ditching and evacuation ===
About ninety seconds later, at 15:30, the plane made an unpowered ditching, descending southwards at about 125 knots (140 mph; 230 km/h) into the middle of the North River section of the Hudson tidal estuary, at 40.769444°N 74.004444°W on the New York side of the state line, roughly opposite West 50th Street (near the Intrepid Museum) in Midtown Manhattan and Port Imperial in Weehawken, New Jersey.

According to flight data recorder (FDR) data, the plane impacted the river at a calibrated airspeed of 125 knots (140 mph; 230 km/h) with a 9.5° pitch angle, flight path angle of −3.4°, angle of attack between 13° and 14°, and a descent rate of 750 feet per minute (3.8 m/s). Flight attendants compared the ditching to a "hard landing" with "one impact, no bounce, then a gradual deceleration". The ebb tide then began to take the plane southward.

Sullenberger opened the cockpit door and gave the order to evacuate. The crew began evacuating the passengers through the four overwing window exits and into an inflatable slide raft deployed from the front right passenger door (the front left slide failed to operate, so the manual inflation handle was pulled). The evacuation was made more difficult by the fact that someone opened the rear left door, allowing more water to enter the plane; whether this was a flight attendant or a passenger is disputed. Water was also entering through a hole in the fuselage and through cargo doors that had come open, so as the water rose the attendant urged passengers to move forward by climbing over seats. (Note: The Airbus A320 has a control that closes valves and other openings in the fuselage, in order to slow flooding after a water landing, but the pilots did not activate it. Sullenberger later said this would have made little difference since the water impact tore substantial holes in the fuselage.) One passenger was a wheelchair user. Finally, Sullenberger walked the cabin twice to confirm it was empty.

The air and water temperatures were about 19 °F (−7 °C) and 41 °F (5 °C), respectively. Some evacuees waited for rescue knee-deep in water on the partially submerged slides, with some wearing life vests. Others stood on the wings or, fearing an explosion, swam away from the plane. One passenger, after helping with the evacuation, found the wing so crowded that he jumped into the river and swam to a boat.

=== Rescue ===
Coast Guard video of the water landing, and rescue

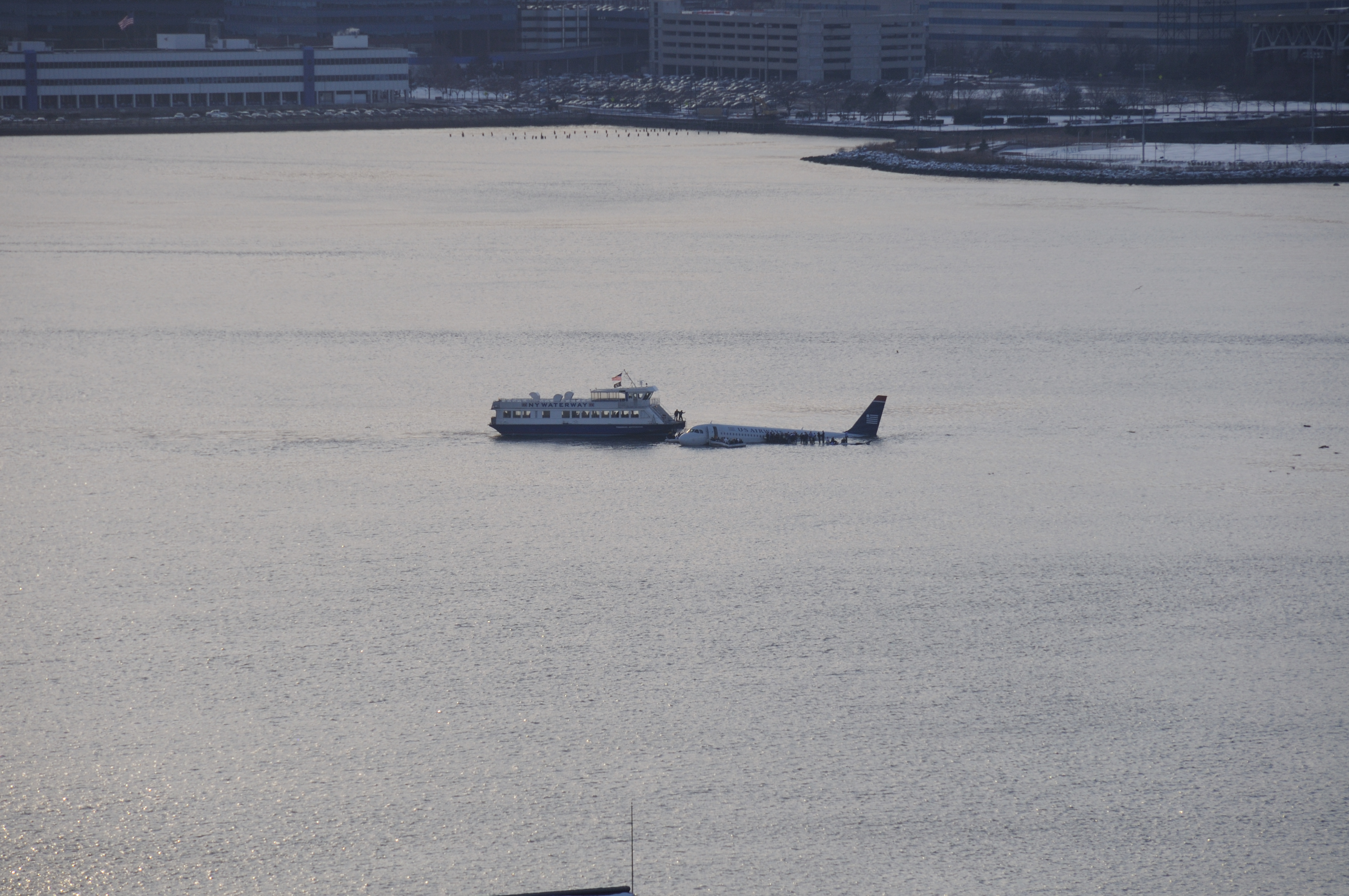
First NY Waterway ferry arrives at the crash site

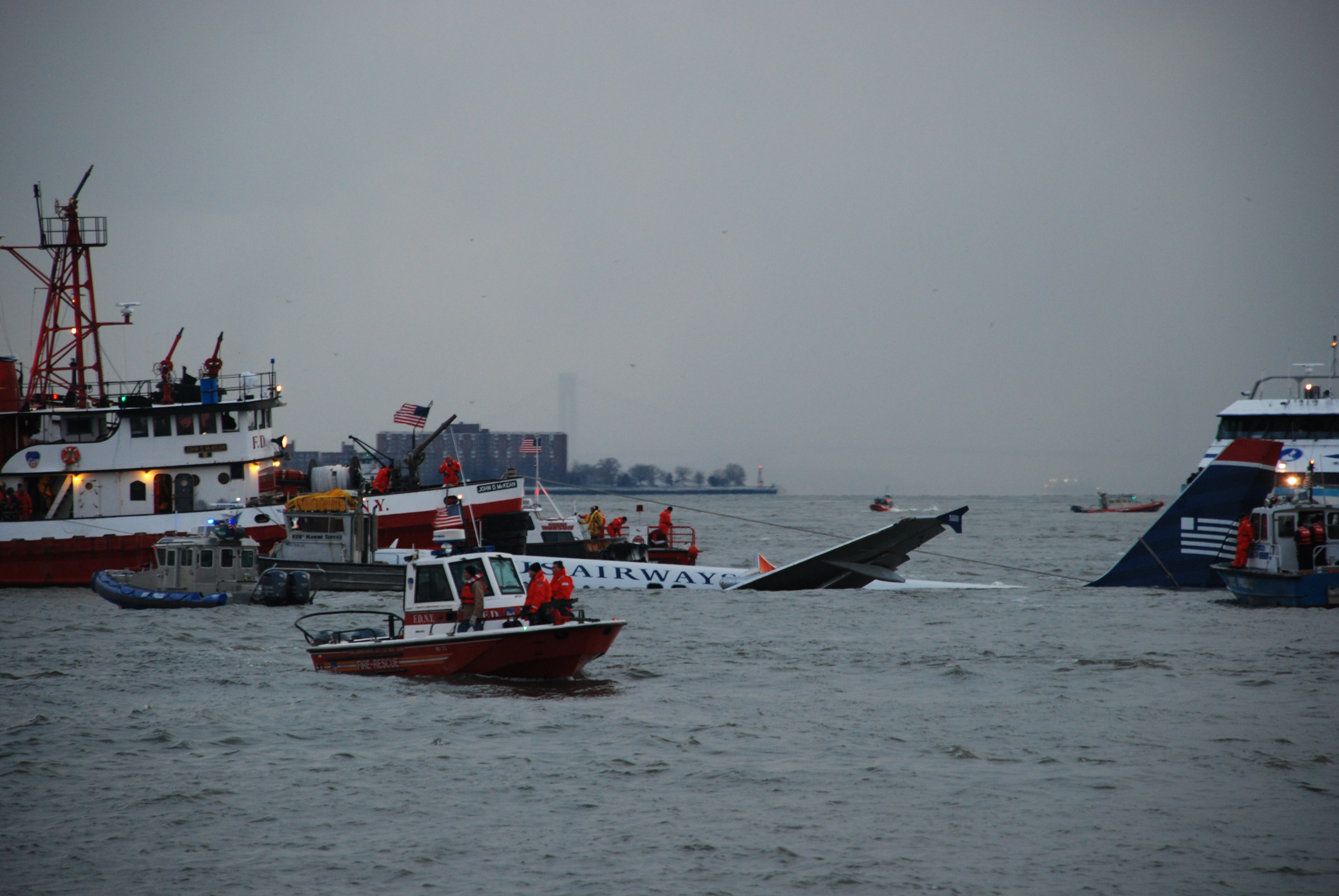
Rescue efforts and the Coast Guard, as well as Flight 1549 halfway sinking

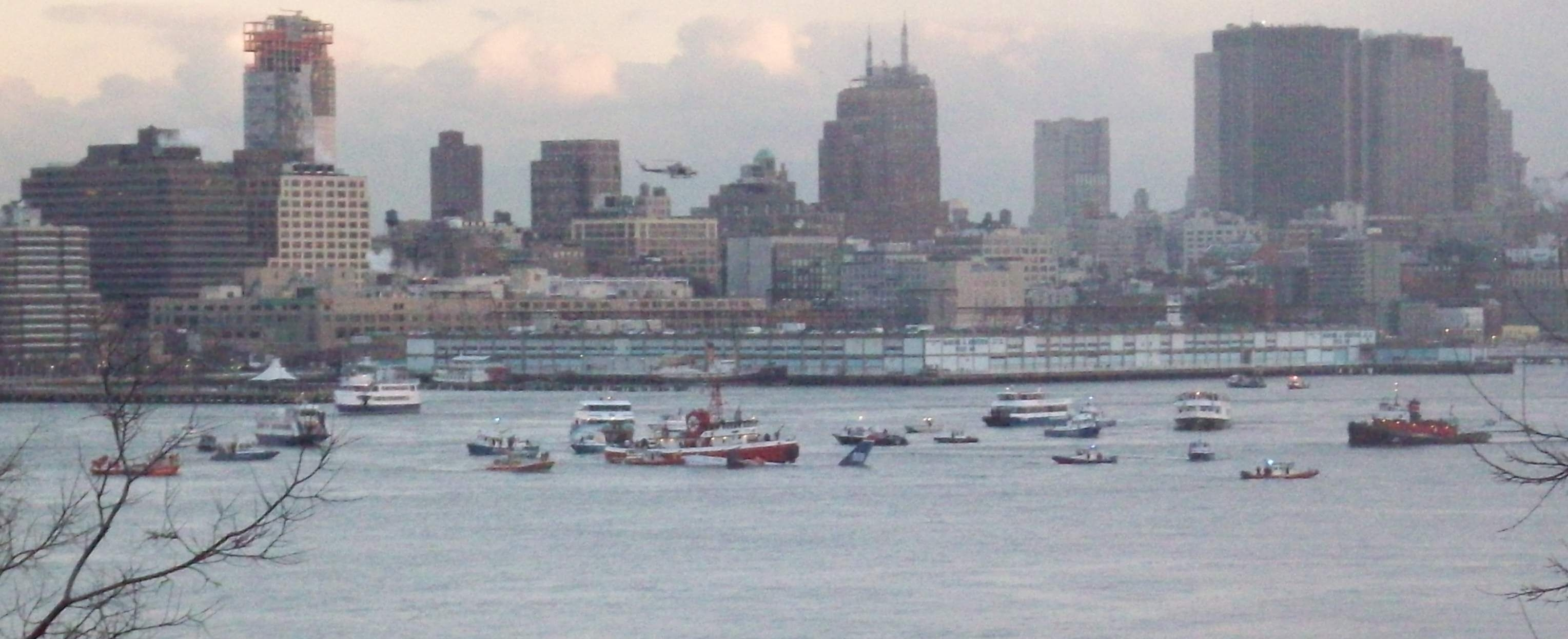
Boats surround the tail of the sunken plane, visible just above the water line

Two NY Waterway ferries arrived within minutes and began taking people aboard using a Jason's cradle; numerous other boats, including from the U.S. Coast Guard, were quickly on scene as well. Sullenberger and 18 passengers and crew were rescued by the Block Island high speed ferry Athena. Sullenberger advised the ferry crews to rescue those on the wings first, as they were in more jeopardy than those on the slides, which detached to become life rafts. The last person was taken from the plane at 15:55.

About 140 New York City firefighters responded to nearby docks, as did police, helicopters, and various vessels and divers. Other agencies provided medical help on the Weehawken side of the river, where most passengers were taken.

== Aftermath ==
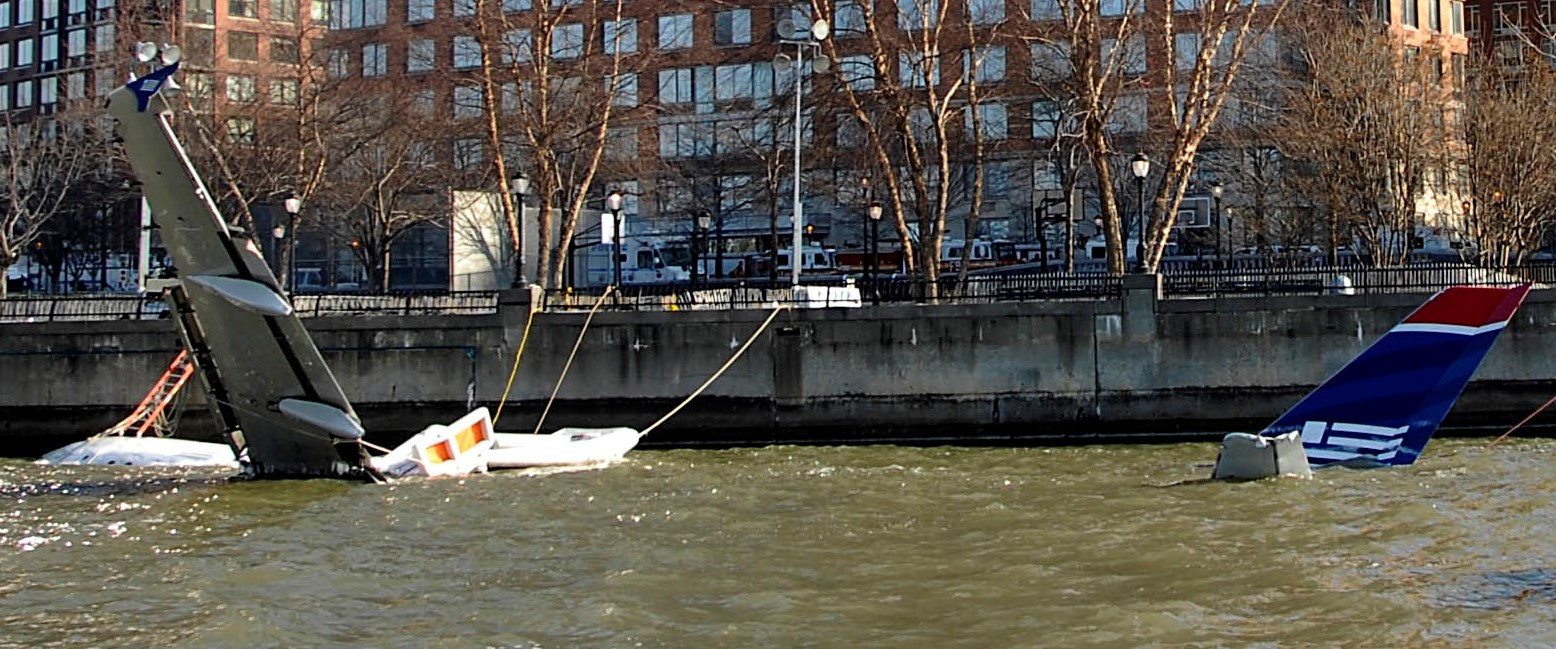
The partially submerged aircraft tied up alongside Battery Park City

Passengers and crew sustained 95 minor and five serious injuries, (Note: A serious injury is defined as any injury that (1) requires hospitalization for more than 48 hours, starting within seven days from the date that the injury was received; (2) results in a fracture of any bone, except simple fractures of fingers, toes, or the nose; (3) causes severe hemorrhages or nerve, muscle, or tendon damage; (4) involves any internal organ; or (5) involves second- or third-degree burns or any burns affecting more than 5 percent of the body surface. A minor injury is defined as any injury that does not qualify as a fatal or serious injury.) including a deep laceration on flight attendant Welsh's leg. 78 people received medical treatment, mostly for minor injuries and hypothermia; 24 passengers and two rescuers were treated at hospitals, with two passengers kept overnight. Eye damage from jet fuel caused one passenger to need glasses. No animals were being carried on the flight.

Each passenger later received a letter of apology, $5,000 in compensation for lost baggage (and $5,000 more if they could demonstrate larger losses), and a refund of their ticket price. In May 2009, they received any belongings that had been recovered. Passengers also reported offers of $10,000 each in return for agreeing not to sue US Airways.

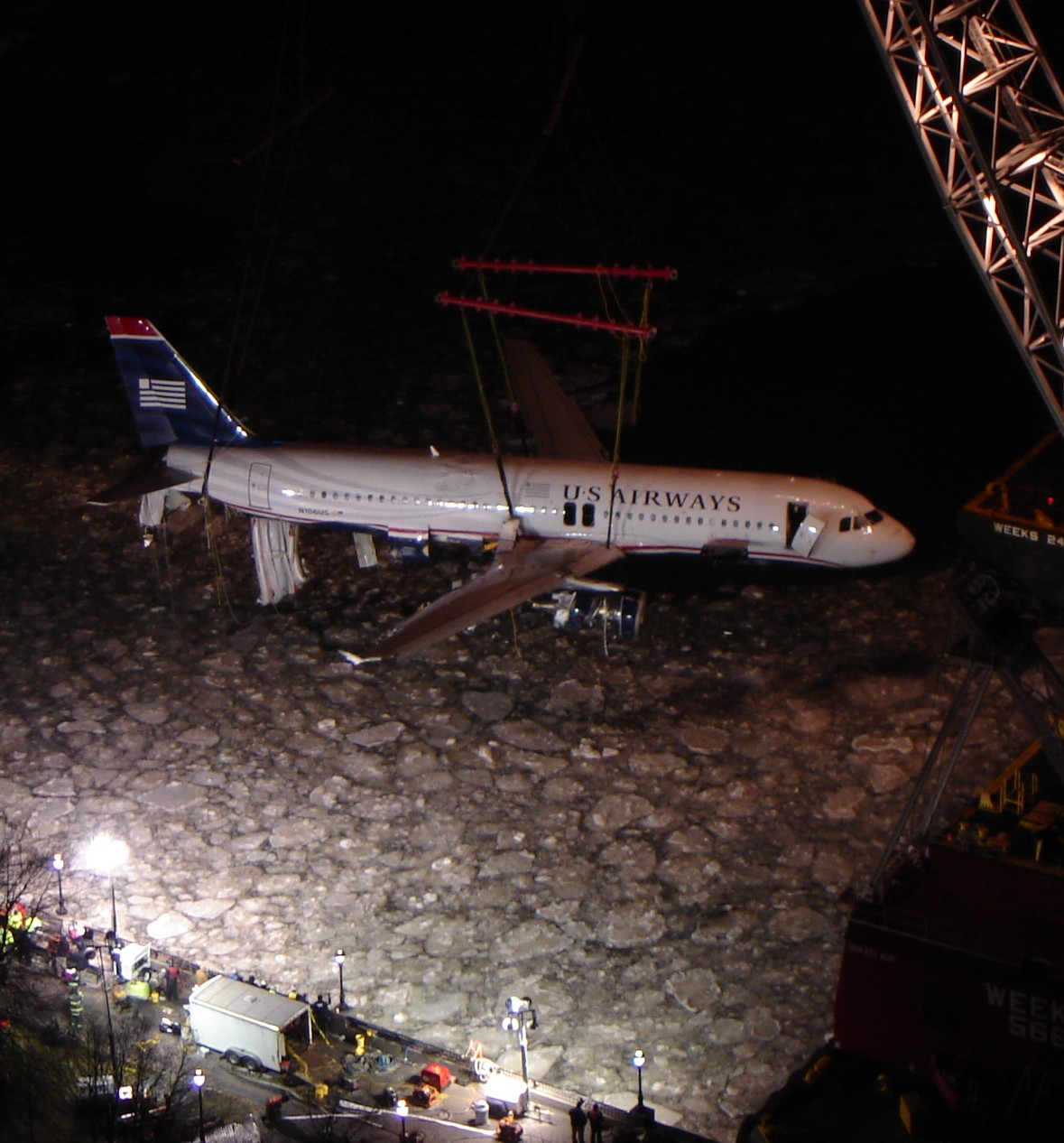
The plane being recovered from the river during the night of January 17

Many passengers and rescuers later experienced post-traumatic stress symptoms such as sleeplessness, flashbacks, and panic attacks; some began an email support group. Patrick Harten, the controller who had worked the flight, said that "the hardest, most traumatic part of the entire event was when it was over", and that he was "gripped by raw moments of shock and grief".

A few months after the crash, Captain Sullenberger, while being interviewed by AARP: The Magazine, was asked how he was able to execute a nearly perfect water landing. He replied, "One way of looking at this might be that for 42 years, I've been making small, regular deposits in this bank of experience, education and training. And on January 15, the balance was sufficient so that I could make a very large withdrawal."

In an effort to prevent similar accidents, officials captured and exterminated 1,235 Canada geese at 17 locations across New York City in mid-2009 and coated 1,739 goose eggs with oil to smother the developing goslings. As of 2017, 70,000 birds had been intentionally killed in New York City through programs instituted after the ditching.

N106US, the accident aircraft, was purchased by the Carolinas Aviation Museum (since renamed to Sullenberger Aviation Museum) in Charlotte, North Carolina, where it (and the plane's engines) was put on display.

== Investigation ==
The partially submerged plane was towed downstream and moored to a pier near the World Financial Center in Lower Manhattan, roughly 4 miles (6.4 km) from the ditching location. On January 17, the aircraft was taken by barge to New Jersey. The left engine, which had been detached from the aircraft by the ditching, was recovered from the riverbed on January 23.

The initial National Transportation Safety Board (NTSB) evaluation that the plane had lost thrust after a bird strike was confirmed by analysis of the cockpit voice and flight data recorders.

It was found in the investigation that two days before the accident, the aircraft had experienced a compressor stall on the right engine, but the engine had restarted and the flight was completed. A faulty temperature sensor was found to be the cause of the compressor stall. This sensor had been replaced and the inspection also verified the engine had not been damaged in that incident.

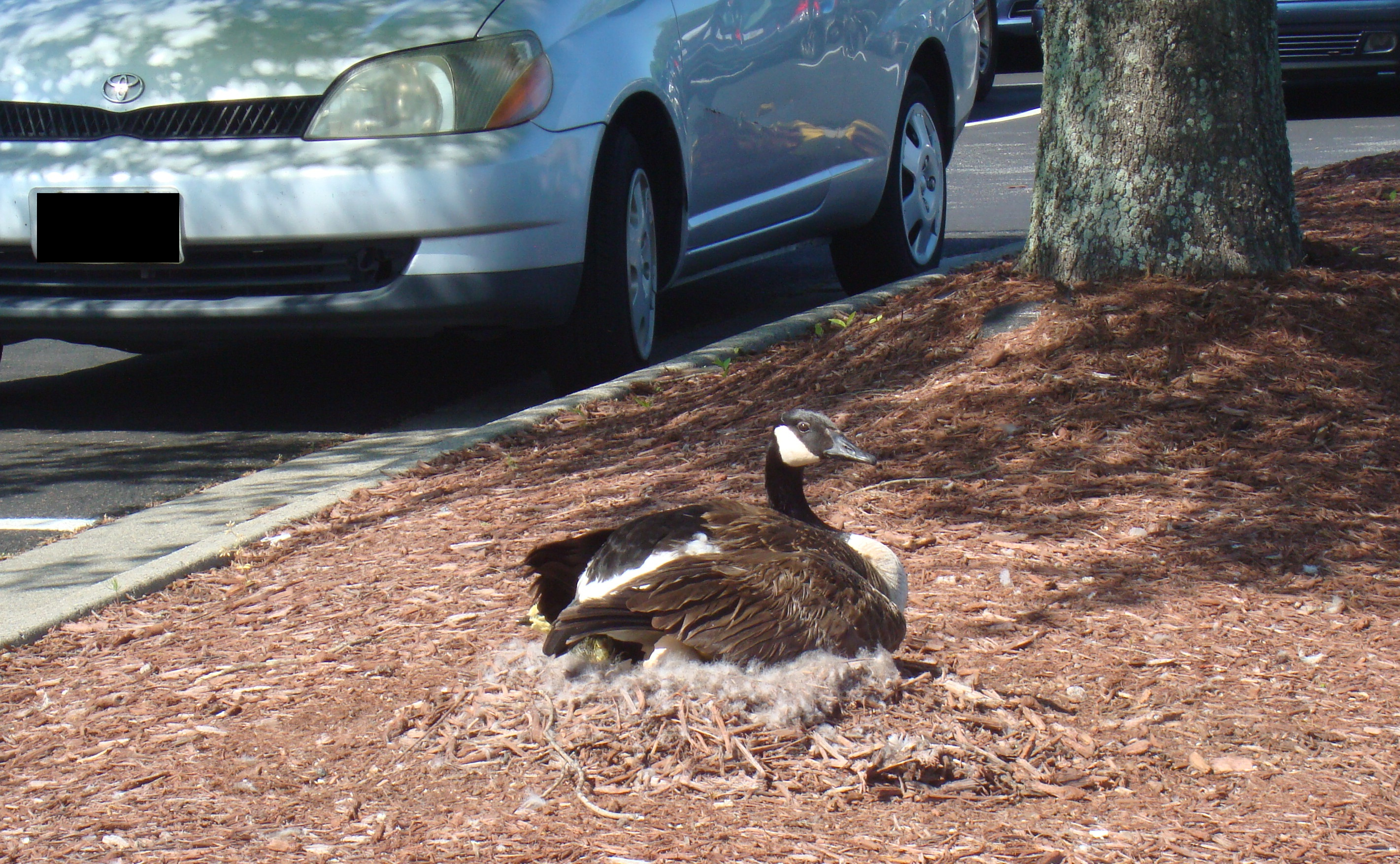
A Canada goose brooding its eggs

On January 21, the NTSB found evidence of damage from a soft-body impact in the right engine along with organic debris including a feather. The left engine also showed soft-body impacts, with "dents on both the spinner and inlet lip of the engine cowling. Five booster inlet guide vanes are fractured and eight outlet guide vanes are missing." Both engines, missing large portions of their housings, were sent to the manufacturer for examination. On January 31, the plane was moved to Kearny, New Jersey. The bird remains were later identified by DNA testing to be Canada geese, which typically weigh more than engines are designed to withstand ingesting.

Since the plane had been assembled in France, the European Aviation Safety Agency (EASA; the European counterpart of the FAA) and the Bureau of Enquiry and Analysis for Civil Aviation Safety (BEA; the French counterpart of the NTSB) joined the investigation, with technical assistance from Airbus and GE Aviation/Snecma, respectively the manufacturers of the airframe and the engines.

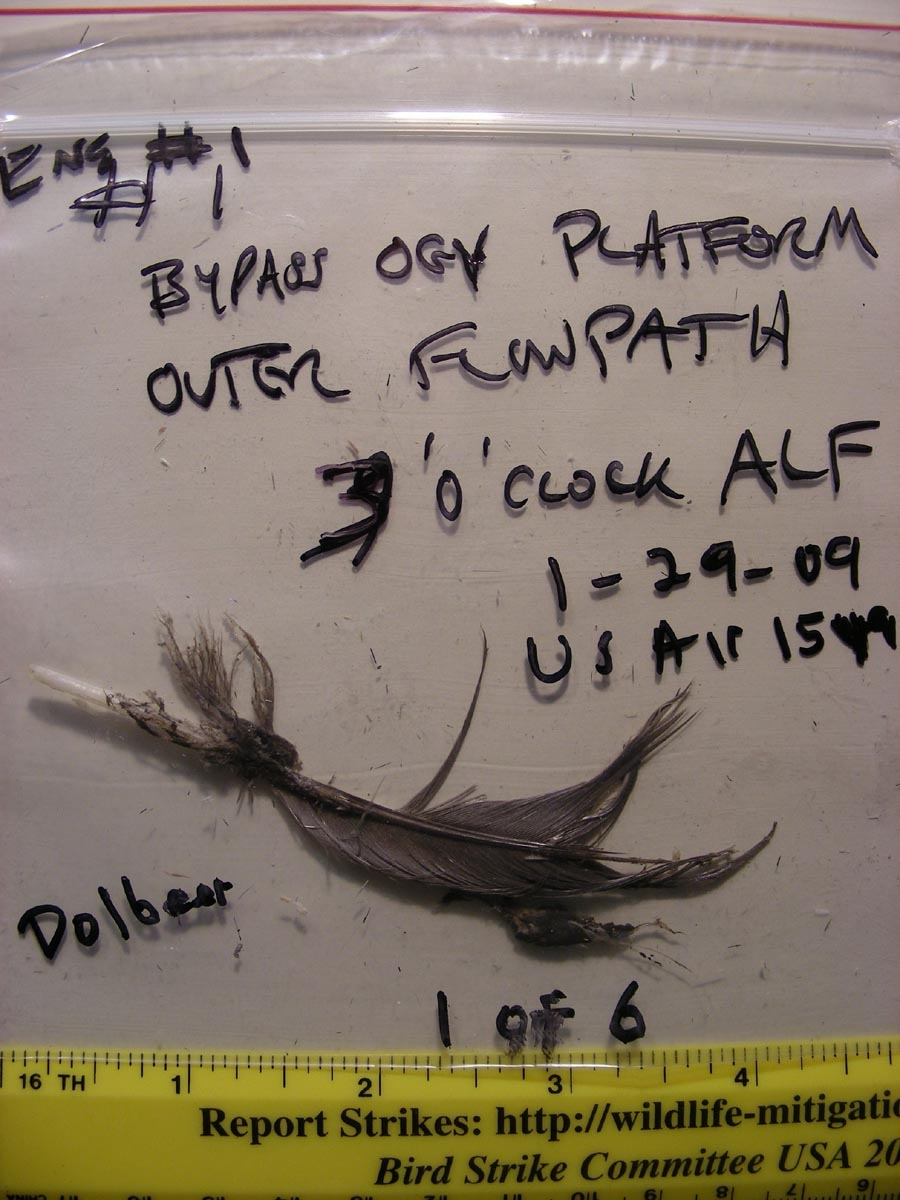
Goose feather found in the left engine

The NTSB used flight simulators to test the possibility that the flight could have returned safely to LaGuardia or diverted to Teterboro; only seven of the thirteen simulated returns to La Guardia succeeded, and only one of the two to Teterboro. Furthermore, the NTSB report called these simulations unrealistic: "The immediate turn made by the pilots during the simulations did not reflect or account for real-world considerations, such as the time delay required to recognize the bird strike and decide on a course of action." A further simulation, in which a 35-second delay was inserted to allow for those, crashed. In testimony before the NTSB, Sullenberger maintained that there had been no time to bring the plane to any airport and that attempting to do so would likely have killed those onboard and more on the ground.

The Board ultimately ruled that Sullenberger had made the correct decision, reasoning that the checklist for dual-engine failure is designed for higher altitudes when pilots have more time to deal with the situation, and that while simulations showed that the plane might have just barely made it back to LaGuardia, those scenarios assumed an instant decision to do so, with no time allowed for assessing the situation.

On May 4, 2010, the NTSB issued its final report, which identified the probable cause as "the ingestion of large birds into each engine, which resulted in an almost total loss of thrust in both engines". The final report credited the outcome to four factors: good decision-making and teamwork by the cockpit crew (including decisions to immediately turn on the APU and to ditch in the Hudson); that the A320 is certified for extended overwater operation (and hence carried life vests and additional raft/slides, despite those not being required for that route); the performance of the flight crew during the evacuation; and the proximity of working vessels to the ditching site. Contributing factors were good visibility and fast response times from the ferry operators and emergency responders. The report made 34 recommendations, including that engines be tested for resistance to bird strikes at low speeds; development of checklists for dual-engine failures at low altitude, and changes to checklist design in general "to minimize the risk of flight crewmembers becoming stuck in an inappropriate checklist or portion of a checklist"; improved pilot training for water landings; provision of life vests on all flights regardless of route, and changes to the locations of vests and other emergency equipment; research into improved wildlife management, and technical innovations on aircraft, to reduce bird strikes; research into possible changes in passenger brace positions; and research into "methods of overcoming passengers' inattention" during preflight safety briefings.

Author and pilot William Langewiesche asserted that insufficient credit was given to the A320's fly-by-wire design, by which the pilot uses a side-stick to make control inputs to the flight control computers. The computers then impose adjustments and limits of their own to keep the plane stable, which the pilot cannot override even in an emergency. This design allowed the pilots of Flight 1549 to concentrate on engine restart and deciding the course, without the burden of manually adjusting the glidepath to reduce the plane's rate of descent. Sullenberger, however, said that these computer-imposed limits also prevented him from achieving the optimal landing flare for the ditching, which would have softened the impact.

== Crew awards and honors ==
The reactions of all members of the crew, the split second decision making and the handling of this emergency and evacuation was "text book" and an example to us all. To have safely executed this emergency ditching and evacuation, with the loss of no lives, is a heroic and unique aviation achievement.

— Guild of Air Pilots and Air Navigators citation

An NTSB board member called the ditching "the most successful ... in aviation history. These people knew what they were supposed to do and they did it and as a result, no lives were lost." New York State Governor David Paterson called the incident "a Miracle on the Hudson". U.S. President George W. Bush said he was "inspired by the skill and heroism of the flight crew", and praised the emergency responders and volunteers. President-elect Barack Obama said that everyone was proud of Sullenberger's "heroic and graceful job in landing the damaged aircraft". He thanked the crew, whom he invited to his inauguration five days later.

The Guild of Air Pilots and Air Navigators awarded the crew the rarely bestowed Master's Medal on January 22, 2009, for outstanding aviation achievement, at the discretion of the Master of the Guild. New York City Mayor Michael Bloomberg presented the crew with the Keys to the City, and Sullenberger with a replacement copy of a library book lost on the flight, Sidney Dekker's Just Culture: Balancing Safety and Accountability. Rescuers received certificates of honor.

The crew received a standing ovation at the Super Bowl XLIII on February 1, 2009, and Sullenberger threw the ceremonial first pitch of the 2009 Major League Baseball season for the San Francisco Giants. His Giants jersey was inscribed with the name "Sully" and the number 155— the count of people aboard the plane.

On July 28, passengers Dave Sanderson and Barry Leonard organized a thank-you luncheon for emergency responders.

Sullenberger was named grand marshal for the 2010 Tournament of Roses Parade in Pasadena, California.

Sullenberger retired on March 3, 2010, after thirty years with US Airways and its predecessor, Pacific Southwest Airlines. At the end of his final flight he was reunited with Skiles and a number of the passengers from Flight 1549.

On April 28, 2010, the entire flight crew were awarded the National Air and Space Museum Trophy for Current Achievement. In 2013, they were also inducted into the International Air & Space Hall of Fame at the San Diego Air & Space Museum.

In August 2010, aeronautical chart publisher Jeppesen issued a humorous approach plate titled "Hudson Miracle APCH", dedicated to the five crew of Flight 1549 and annotated "Presented with Pride and Gratitude from your friends at Jeppesen".

== In popular culture ==
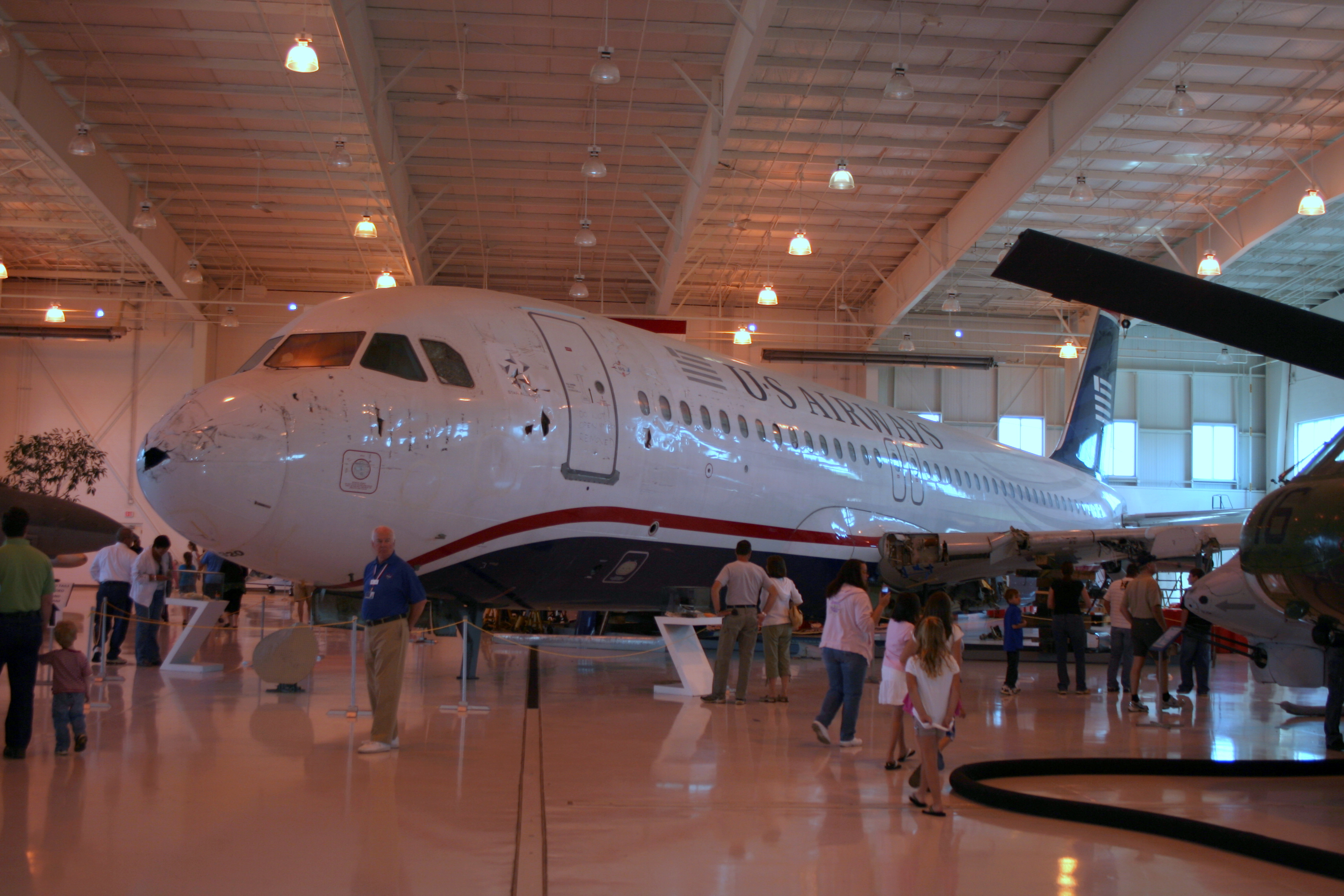
N106US on display at Sullenberger Aviation Museum

Sullenberger's 2009 memoir, Highest Duty: My Search for What Really Matters, was adapted into the feature film Sully, directed by Clint Eastwood. It stars Tom Hanks as Sullenberger and Aaron Eckhart as Skiles. Vince Lombardi, the captain of the first ferry to reach the downed plane, appears as himself. It was released by Warner Bros. on September 9, 2016.

Comedian Nathan Fielder staged an absurdist recreation of Sullenberger's entire life, from infancy up to a simulated recreation of the N106US incident, starring himself as Sullenberger, as part of the second season of HBO's documentary comedy series The Rehearsal.

Irish composer Donnacha Dennehy wrote Hard Landing about the event. It was commissioned by the BBC, first performed by the BBC National Orchestra of Wales on 6 February 2025, and premiered on BBC Radio 3 on 29 March 2025.

It has been reported that a cocktail had been named in Sullenberger's honor: the "Sully" consisted of two shots of Grey Goose vodka and a splash of water.

== See also ==
- Scandinavian Airlines System Flight 751
- Aeroflot Flight 366
- Ural Airlines Flight 178
- Garuda Indonesia Flight 421
- TACA Flight 110
- List of airline flights that required gliding
