= Pressure's Looking Good So Far =

- The Curse episode
- Episode no.: Episode 2
- Directed by: David Zellner; Nathan Zellner
- Story by: Nathan Fielder; Benny Safdie; Carrie Kemper
- Teleplay by: Carrie Kemper
- Cinematography by: Maceo Bishop
- Editing by: Stacy Moon
- Original release date: November 19, 2023
- Running time: 54 minutes

Guest appearances
- Gary Farmer as James Toledo; Marcus LaVoi as Wandall

Episode chronology
← Previous "Land of Enchantment"	Next → "Questa Lane"

"Pressure's Looking Good So Far" is the second episode of the American television satire black comedy The Curse. The episode was written by co-executive producer Carrie Kemper, from a story by Kemper and series creators Nathan Fielder and Benny Safdie, and directed by David Zellner and Nathan Zellner. It originally aired on streaming and on-demand for all Showtime and Paramount+ with Showtime subscribers on November 17, 2023, before making its on-air debut on Showtime on November 19, 2023. The episode was screened at the 2023 New York Film Festival.

The series follows Whitney and Asher Siegel, a newly married couple as they try to conceive a child while co-starring on their problematic new HGTV show, Fliplanthropy. Also joining them on their show is Dougie Schecter, a producer who is trying to make the best possible version of the show in order to reach a wider audience. In the episode, Asher tries to find footage from the casino to get them to a local reporter, while Whitney tries to sign an artist into their project. Meanwhile, Dougie shares an awkward date with a woman.

According to Nielsen Media Research, the episode was seen by an estimated 0.045 million household viewers and gained a 0.01 ratings share among adults aged 18–49. The episode received positive reviews from critics, who praised the humor, performances and directing.

== Plot ==
Asher (Nathan Fielder) meets with the reporter, Monica Perez, to disclose information on the Whistling River casino, but she is not convinced it is enough for a story. He visits the casino in a failed attempt to access the cameras that might help him expose the casino's corruption. Later, Asher and Whitney take their friend Cara (Nizhonniya Luxi Austin), a Pueblo artist, out to dinner in order to ask her to be a consultant on their show, but Whitney stops Asher from pitching it even though it was her idea. Cara cuts the meal short due to a "work emergency" and Whitney (Emma Stone) tells Asher that she is pregnant, much to his delight.

Dougie (Benny Safdie) goes on a date with Laura (Adrianne Chalepah), telling her that he failed a breathalyzer test after being in a car accident in which his wife was killed. Despite his involvement as a driver, Dougie claims he is not responsible. He drives Laura home, where he confides that he often thinks about leaving the state as he is not certain of the pilot's prospects. He then uses a breathalyzer to test his blood alcohol content, which is 0.02 decimal over the limit. He pulls the car over and he and Laura walk the rest of the way home.

Asher goes to the casino again in an attempt to get access to footage. However, it does not go as planned, so Asher improvises by showing a viral video to his friend and former co-worker Bill (David DeLao). When Bill does not leave his office, Asher decides to spill Gatorade over the carpet and himself, forcing Bill to leave for some towels. After he leaves, Asher covertly downloads footage from Bill's computer. As Asher is leaving, he runs into Dougie, who is gambling.

Asher and Whitney visit Cara's art gallery in Picuris Pueblo. Whitney is confused by Cara's performance piece, wherein Cara gives her turkey slices and screams without explanation when she eats them. Asher and Whitney then go to the doctor for an ultrasound. However, the doctor informs them that Whitney actually has an ectopic pregnancy and will have to undergo a procedure to end the pregnancy.

== Production ==
=== Development ===
The episode was written by co-executive producer Carrie Kemper, from a story by Kemper and series creators Nathan Fielder and Benny Safdie, and directed by David Zellner and Nathan Zellner. This was Kemper's first writing credit, Fielder's second writing credit, Safdie's second writing credit, and the Zellners' first directing credit.

== Reception ==
=== Viewers ===
In its original American broadcast, "Pressure's Looking Good So Far" was seen by an estimated 0.045 million household viewers and gained a 0.01 ratings share among adults aged 18–49, according to Nielsen Media Research. This means that 0.01 percent of all households with televisions watched the episode. This was a slight decrease in viewership from the previous episode, which was watched by 0.058 million viewers with a 0.01 in the 18-49 demographics.

=== Critical reviews ===
"Pressure's Looking Good So Far" received positive reviews from critics. Manuel Betancourt of The A.V. Club gave the episode a "B+" grade and wrote, "With lofty ambitions beyond the gimmicky plot its title and logline would suggest, this discomforting riff on home makeover shows has already tackled micropenises and gentrification and now sets its sights on Native exploitation and artistic appropriation. It's a thrill to watch. And maybe only a little uncomfortable to do so. But that's part of the point."

Alan Sepinwall of Rolling Stone wrote, "In so many circumstances, the filmmakers (this one directed by David and Nathan Zellner) are presenting us with obscured or distorted views of their subjects, as if they're trying to hide what Whitney, Asher, and Dougie are really about as much as the three of them try to hide from one another. But many of their motivations come through as clearly as if Asher's car had been freshly Windexed."

Amanda Whiting of Vulture gave the episode a 4 star rating out of 5 and wrote, "I would take the excruciating awkwardness of every Nathan Fielder choreographed moment like a pro. I did not intend to leave myself any loopholes, and yet this week, in Bill's casino office, I instinctively muted my computer when the Gatorade showers began. I promise to do better." Caemeron Crain of TV Obsessive wrote, "[The episode] wants you to suffer, and to luxuriate in every discomfiting frame of its hour. It's about the pregnant pauses and the facial expressions that belie a difference between surface and depth. It's about the uncertainty that creates and being asked to live in that space. And by this metric, 'Pressure's Looking Good So Far' is brilliant."

Esther Zuckerman of The New York Times wrote, "There are multiple moments in the second episode of The Curse when the camera lingers on the desperation behind a character's eyes. While last week's premiere established that these people are often despicable, the follow up plunges deeper into their loneliness and sadness." Fletcher Peters of The Daily Beast wrote, "Love is patient, love is kind — which means sometimes, you have to wait until after your partner steals highly classified documents from a casino before you can tell him you’re pregnant."
