= The Fire Burns On =

- The Curse episode
- Episode no.: Episode 6
- Directed by: Nathan Fielder
- Written by: Nathan Fielder; Benny Safdie
- Cinematography by: Maceo Bishop
- Editing by: Adam Locke-Norton
- Original release date: December 17, 2023
- Running time: 38 minutes

Guest appearances
- Hikmah Warsame as Nala; Barkhad Abdi as Abshir

Episode chronology
← Previous "It's a Good Day"	Next → "Self-Exclusion"

"The Fire Burns On" is the sixth episode of the American television satire black comedy The Curse. The episode was written by series creators Nathan Fielder and Benny Safdie, and directed by Fielder. It originally aired on streaming and on-demand for all Showtime and Paramount+ with Showtime subscribers on December 15, 2023, before making its on-air debut on Showtime on December 17, 2023. The episode was screened at the Film at Lincoln Center.

The series follows Whitney and Asher Siegel, a newly married couple as they try to conceive a child while co-starring on their problematic new HGTV show, Fliplanthropy. Also joining them on their show is Dougie Schecter, a producer who is trying to make the best possible version of the show in order to reach a wider audience. In the episode, Dougie decides to make some adjustments to the show after having a poor impression of a rough cut. Meanwhile, Asher once again questions if the curse is real.

According to Nielsen Media Research, the episode was seen by an estimated 0.027 million household viewers and gained a 0.00 ratings share among adults aged 18–49. The episode received generally positive reviews from critics, although some questioned the series' pacing and aimlessness.

== Plot ==
Dougie (Benny Safdie) and Whitney (Emma Stone) watch a rough cut of an episode for Fliplanthropy. Whitney dislikes the episode, deeming it "lifeless". Dougie agrees with her, explaining that there is no conflict nor drama at the center of the show. He suggests adding some voice-overs to build up conflict among Whitney and Asher (Nathan Fielder), improving the show's prospects. Whitney likes the idea, and even suggests changing the show's name to Green Queen, which Dougie approves.

Asher and Whitney prepare to film a segment at the local firehouse. During this, Dougie gets a firefighter to flirt with Whitney, which is caught on camera. While using the firehouse's bathroom, Asher finds raw chicken in the sink. He confronts Dougie over the event, but he states that he is not responsible for that, as he would have had cameras rolling if he was playing a prank on Asher. Unconvinced, Asher consults with a security guard to check footage in the firehouse. However, the video only proves Dougie's innocence as he never entered the bathroom. As a brief blackout happens due to the Siegels' new installed system, Asher once again questions if the curse is real.

As Abshir (Barkhad Abdi) leaves for a chiropractic adjustment, Asher visits Nala (Hikmah Warsame) to give her a tetherball set. As she plays, Asher decides to test the curse by picking screws and asking her to guess how many he has in a bucket. Nala correctly guesses every time, alarming Asher. He decides to go bolder and picks a lot of screws in his hand and asks her to guess. However, she is unable to answer, scared because Asher's hand is bleeding from gripping the screws too tightly.

== Production ==
=== Development ===
The episode was written by series creators Nathan Fielder and Benny Safdie, and directed by Fielder. This was Fielder's sixth writing credit, Safdie's sixth writing credit, and Fielder's third directing credit.

== Reception ==
=== Viewers ===
In its original American broadcast, "The Fire Burns On" was seen by an estimated 0.027 million household viewers and gained a 0.00 ratings share among adults aged 18–49, according to Nielsen Media Research. This means that 0.00 percent of all households with televisions watched the episode. This was an 80% increase in viewership from the previous episode, which was watched by 0.015 million viewers with a 0.00 in the 18-49 demographics.

=== Critical reviews ===
"The Fire Burns On" received generally positive reviews from critics. Manuel Betancourt of The A.V. Club gave the episode a "B" grade and wrote, "while Whitney is busy concocting ways to make Filanthropy (or Green Queen, now) ever more entertaining, Asher is... harassing a child. Truly a match made in HGTV heaven. No wonder Dougie, producer extraordinaire, sees a bright reality TV wreck of a future for them."

Alan Sepinwall of Rolling Stone wrote, "Six episodes in, certain things are clear. Stone, Fielder, and Safdie are all giving interesting performances. And Fielder, Safdie, and the various Curse directors have created an atmosphere of relentless dread and discomfort. But what's it all in service of? And why is it taking so long for things to start happening?"

Amanda Whiting of Vulture gave the episode a perfect 5 star rating out of 5 and wrote, "I watched this interminable scene through my fingers. In truth, I barely watched this scene at all. When the credits finally rolled, I did what I imagine we all did. I picked up my phone and Googled “chiropractic adjustment death real or fake.”" Caemeron Crain of TV Obsessive wrote, "It would be easy to say that the Siegels are being too idealistic in their vision for Española, and you could argue that their mistakes flow from that. Alternately, you could argue that they are just exploiting this community in order to turn a profit at the end of the day, once they’ve successfully gentrified it. Both of those explanations strike me as too simple, which is what makes The Curse so compelling. The answer lies somewhere in between."

Esther Zuckerman of The New York Times wrote, "Maybe it's something more akin to concern. After all, as he says it, his left hand is dripping with blood. It's his own fault. He filled his palm with nails to test whether Nala has some sort of psychic powers. This is a sign of a man losing his grip with reality." Fletcher Peters of The Daily Beast wrote, "Is there a curse? Is Asher losing it? I'd say we need answers, but I'm starting to get used to living in the chaotic limbo of Española."
