= Young Hearts (The Curse) =

- The Curse episode
- Episode no.: Episode 9
- Directed by: Nathan Fielder
- Written by: Nathan Fielder; Benny Safdie
- Cinematography by: Maceo Bishop
- Editing by: Adam Locke-Norton
- Original release date: January 7, 2024
- Running time: 60 minutes

Guest appearances
- Constance Shulman as Elizabeth; Gary Farmer as James Toledo; Christopher Calderon as Fernando; Corbin Bernsen as Paul

Episode chronology
← Previous "Down and Dirty"	Next → "Green Queen"

"Young Hearts" is the ninth episode of the American television satire black comedy The Curse. The episode was written by series creators Nathan Fielder and Benny Safdie and directed by Fielder. It originally aired on streaming and on-demand for all Showtime and Paramount+ with Showtime subscribers on January 5, 2024, before making its on-air debut on Showtime on January 7, 2024. The episode was screened at the Film at Lincoln Center.

The series follows Whitney and Asher Siegel, a newly married couple as they try to conceive a child while co-starring on their problematic new HGTV show, Fliplanthropy. Also joining them on their show is Dougie Schecter, a producer who is trying to make the best possible version of the show in order to reach a wider audience. In the episode, HGTV makes a request for Fliplanthropy, while Whitney tries to improve her image with Asher.

According to Nielsen Media Research, the episode was seen by an estimated 0.034 million household viewers and gained a 0.01 ratings share among adults aged 18–49. The episode received extremely positive reviews from critics, who praised the performances (especially Nathan Fielder), character development, tone and ending.

== Plot ==
Whitney (Emma Stone) and Dougie (Benny Safdie) meet with Martha (GiGi Erneta), an HGTV representative. They had already committed in working to portray Asher (Nathan Fielder) in a negative light, hoping it will lead to more buzz for the show. However, Martha states that she wants Fliplanthropy to depict a happy marriage without any kind of controversy, which contradicts Dougie's original statement.

Wanting to build a better image of herself and Asher, Whitney gets him to accompany her to a bowling alley to play and have fun, with Asher unaware of her plan with Dougie. Whitney also struggles when people continue questioning her for her parents' past, which results in a crew member getting fired. She tries to correct it by rehiring the crew member, to no success. She decides to confront her parents over their actions, scolding them for prioritizing their business over the community.

After overhearing Asher expressing his sexual fantasy over other men having sex with her, Whitney decides to show him a rough cut of Green Queen. The cut depicts many of the issues that Whitney has tried to tackle but is prevented from showing, as well as her comments over how Asher is holding her back from achieving her dreams. Asher is shaken by the footage and leaves the room. He returns shortly afterward and demands Dougie use the footage in the show, despite Martha's warning. Asher concludes that the curse was actually himself, blaming himself for all their shortcomings. He apologizes for everything and says he still wants to be with her, promising to change as he believes they can turn it around. Whitney silently stares back at him, trembling and crying.

== Production ==
=== Development ===
The episode was written by series creators Nathan Fielder and Benny Safdie, and directed by Fielder. This was Fielder's ninth writing credit, Safdie's ninth writing credit, and Fielder's sixth directing credit.

== Reception ==
=== Viewers ===
In its original American broadcast, "Young Hearts" was seen by an estimated 0.034 million household viewers and gained a 0.01 ratings share among adults aged 18–49, according to Nielsen Media Research. This means that 0.01 percent of all households with televisions watched the episode. This was a 36% increase in viewership from the previous episode, which was watched by 0.025 million viewers with a 0.00 in the 18-49 demographics.

=== Critical reviews ===
"Young Hearts" received extremely positive reviews from critics. Manuel Betancourt of The A.V. Club gave the episode a "B+" grade and wrote, "while we keep pondering who is Whitney behind all her conniving, manipulative stints and her performative, jokey self-aware white-savior stunts, we may be left wondering only whether there'll be enough Emmy love thrown toward Emma Stone's masterful cringe performance. Because The Curse works only as well as it does because its center, its 'Green Queen' remains a transfixing cipher you can't look away from."

Alan Sepinwall of Rolling Stone wrote, "Nathan Fielder has the lightest acting resume of the main trio, but he's terrific here going toe-to-toe with Stone, verbally bulldozing her while all she can do is try to absorb and understand everything he's saying. It's a terrific episode, easily the highlight of The Curse so far."

Amanda Whiting of Vulture gave the episode a 3 star rating out of 5 and wrote, "Like many a penultimate episode, 'Young Hearts' works hard (and too visibly) to get story lines and characters into position for an eruptive ending, doing so without enough connective tissue to make it truly satisfying as a stand-alone hour of TV. What was this episode about? It was about reminding you of every theme and conflict raised across episodes one through eight, saving the most important for last." Caemeron Crain of TV Obsessive wrote, "Again, I think it feels adjacent, but the vibes from Whitney are also toxic on the whole. It's like the Siegels are competing to see who can be more passive aggressive."

Esther Zuckerman of The New York Times wrote, "This week's episode, is revelatory with regards to Whitney on multiple levels, and it's also a tour de force for Emma Stone, an actress whose natural understanding of the camera and what it can do allows her to play all the facets of this complicated, troubled character. The episode leaves no doubt about just how wrong she and Asher are for each other. But before then, a series of smaller Whitney-related events peel back layers of her carefully constructed persona." Fletcher Peters of The Daily Beast wrote, "Dougie, stunned, speaks for all of us: “That was beautiful.” What the hell is going to happen in this finale?"
