= Land of Enchantment (The Curse) =

- The Curse episode
- Episode no.: Episode 1
- Directed by: Nathan Fielder
- Written by: Nathan Fielder; Benny Safdie
- Cinematography by: Maceo Bishop
- Editing by: Adam Locke-Norton
- Original release date: November 12, 2023
- Running time: 60 minutes

Guest appearances
- Constance Shulman as Elizabeth; Hikmah Warsame as Nala; Dahabo Ahmed as Hani; Christopher Calderon as Fernando; Barkhad Abdi as Abshir; Corbin Bernsen as Paul

Episode chronology
← Previous —	Next → "Pressure's Looking Good So Far"

"Land of Enchantment" is the series premiere of the American television satire black comedy The Curse. The episode was written by series creators Nathan Fielder and Benny Safdie, and directed by Fielder. It originally aired on streaming and on-demand for all Showtime and Paramount+ with Showtime subscribers on November 10, 2023, before making its on-air debut on Showtime on November 12, 2023. The episode was screened at the 2023 New York Film Festival.

The series follows Whitney and Asher Siegel, a newly married couple as they try to conceive a child while co-starring on their problematic new HGTV show, Fliplanthropy. Also joining them on their show is Dougie Schecter, a producer who is trying to make the best possible version of the show in order to reach a wider audience.

According to Nielsen Media Research, the episode was seen by an estimated 0.058 million household viewers and gained a 0.01 ratings share among adults aged 18–49. The series premiere received positive reviews from critics, who praised the performances, absurdism and tone shifts.

== Plot ==
Whitney (Emma Stone) and Asher Siegel (Nathan Fielder) are a newly married couple co-starring on their new HGTV show, Fliplanthropy, in which they use their real-estate-development company to help locals in Española, New Mexico, although their plans are often criticized as gentrification. While filming the pilot, producer Dougie Schecter (Benny Safdie) decides to exploit an interview with a Hispanic family in order to draw more emotion for viewers, making the Siegels uncomfortable.

After watching a cut from the pilot, Dougie tells Asher that the project is not working as it feels like an infomercial and that they need to retool it. During an interview, Whitney is questioned about the Bookends Buildings, properties owned by her slumlord parents which residents call "Hell on Earth". Asher loses his composure and aggressively shuts down the topic, but the Siegels are worried that the fragment will be aired. Asher talks with the reporter, insisting they are "good people" and convincing her that he can give her another news story if she drops the fragment. Dougie and Whitney argue when Whitney wants him to stop filming. Dougie lies and promises to stop, but tells Asher to give a little girl, Nala (Hikmah Warsame), a $100 bill under the pretense of using it as B-roll, but is actually trying to get Asher mic'd for his conversation with the reporter. When they finish filming, Asher takes the $100 bill back, angering Nala. She "curses" him, but Asher dismisses it.

Asher and Whitney have Shabbat dinner with Whitney's parents, Paul (Corbin Bernsen) and Elizabeth (Constance Shulman). Whitney unconfidently sings the bracha over the Shabbat candles and Paul asks why they light candles; Whitney gives an answer from her conversion class while Asher quickly and awkwardly finishes the Shabbat blessings. After dinner Asher is approached by Paul over their financial choices; Asher reassures him that they're "pumping" Española. Paul knows that Asher has a very small penis, and reveals that he suffers from the same condition but is nonetheless happy and successful enough to have loaned them $1,000,000. Asher is infuriated when he finds that Whitney told her parents that they are not trying to conceive children. At home, they have sex involving Asher using a vibrator on Whitney while they role play a cuckold fantasy.

Later, while Dougie is showing Whitney and Asher footage of a different exploitative reality show he worked on which was never picked up, Whitney sees footage of Asher with Nala. Believing in the "curse", Whitney makes Asher go back to the parking lot and give the $100 bill to Nala, but he is unable to find her. Asher checks on a local shelter for the unhoused, but he is only allowed to leave a message as their information cannot be divulged, so he has no idea if they really live there. At home, Dougie tries unsuccessfully to get Whitney to admit on record her insecurities with Asher. Asher returns, and lies about returning the money, claiming there is no "curse" anymore. While Whitney records her dialogue, Asher stares blankly before facing the camera.

== Production ==
=== Development ===
The episode was written by series creators Nathan Fielder and Benny Safdie, and directed by Fielder.

== Reception ==
=== Viewers ===
In its original American broadcast, "Land of Enchantment" was seen by an estimated 0.058 million household viewers and gained a 0.01 ratings share among adults aged 18–49, according to Nielsen Media Research. This means that 0.01 percent of all households with televisions watched the episode.

=== Critical reviews ===
"Land of Enchantment" received positive reviews from critics. Manuel Betancourt of The A.V. Club gave the episode a "B" grade and wrote, "It was about time HGTV got the dark biting satire the network seems so perfectly tailored for. Those ready-made gentrifying and style-flattening house flipping shows were clearly overdue for a smart send-up. And with Showtime's The Curse, we may have finally gotten one that's as biting as it is absurd. For what else would one expect from Nathan Fielder and Benny Safdie?"

Alan Sepinwall of Rolling Stone wrote, "All in all, an intriguing start to this collaboration between Fielder, Safdie, and Stone." Amanda Whiting of Vulture gave the episode a 4 star rating out of 5 and wrote, "The Curse nails what it looks and feels like to live in the world right this second without really doing anything to skewer it. It just represents it so perfectly that you have to (inaudibly) laugh from embarrassment. In a way, it's better than funny; it reveals the joke. It sets the world as you know it to a pulsing score from Oneohtrix Point Never, and suddenly a guy standing in a parking lot waiting to talk to someone feels like one of the most fucked-up things you’ve ever seen on TV."

Esther Zuckerman of The New York Times wrote, "Nathan Fielder is not playing himself for once but his core fascinations are still on display." Caemeron Crain of TV Obsessive wrote, "I'm sure that Whitney will somehow discover that Asher has lied to her and that this curse will have a lasting impact in terms of what's to come. It may not be real, and the Siegels may not believe that it is real, but what is reality anyway? The Curse is primed to explore that question over the course of its run, and I'm looking forward to the ride."

Ethan Shanfeld of Variety wrote, "As Asher quells Whitney's superstitions in the hallway, the camera eerily frames them from behind a peep hole. Their show hasn’t gotten picked up yet, but it seems like they're already being watched." Fletcher Peters of The Daily Beast wrote, "The curse is still in play; Asher still needs to pay for his mistake. While we wait for more hysterical terribleness, I'll be spending the next week trying to wipe the wince off my face. But maybe I'm cursed, too."
