= Self-Exclusion (The Curse) =

- The Curse episode
- Episode no.: Episode 7
- Directed by: Nathan Fielder
- Written by: Nathan Fielder; Benny Safdie
- Cinematography by: Maceo Bishop
- Editing by: Stacy Moon
- Original release date: December 24, 2023
- Running time: 42 minutes

Guest appearances
- Hikmah Warsame as Nala; Corbin Bernsen as Paul

Episode chronology
← Previous "The Fire Burns On"	Next → "Down and Dirty"

"Self-Exclusion" is the seventh episode of the American television satire black comedy The Curse. The episode was written by series creators Nathan Fielder and Benny Safdie, and directed by Fielder. It originally aired on streaming and on-demand for all Showtime and Paramount+ with Showtime subscribers on December 22, 2023, before making its on-air debut on Showtime on December 24, 2023. The episode was screened at the Film at Lincoln Center.

The series follows Whitney and Asher Siegel, a newly married couple as they try to conceive a child while co-starring on their problematic new HGTV show, Fliplanthropy. Also joining them on their show is Dougie Schecter, a producer who is trying to make the best possible version of the show in order to reach a wider audience. In the episode, Whitney and Asher get into an argument over a recent controversy at the casino.

According to Nielsen Media Research, the episode was seen by an estimated 0.022 million household viewers and gained a 0.00 ratings share among adults aged 18–49. The episode received very positive reviews from critics, who praised Emma Stone's performance and character development.

== Plot ==
At school, Nala (Hikmah Warsame) stares silently at one of her bullies as she climbs a rope at gym class, whispering "fall" under her breath. When Nala fails to climb the rope, her bully insults her, prompting Nala to tell the teacher, who simply encourages Nala to believe in herself. Whitney (Emma Stone) visits Cara (Nizhonniya Luxi Austin), unaware that she dislikes her. Trusting her as a "friend", Whitney opens up about the struggles in her marriage, feeling that Asher (Nathan Fielder) is unsupportive of her plan. Cara is uninterested in her story, but decides to continue seeing Whitney when she offers a $20,000 consulting fee.

Asher continues attending the corporate comedy class, still failing in trying to get the rest of the class to laugh. The instructor decides to use Asher's small penis as an inspiration for jokes. When Asher begrudgingly moves forward with the joke, the other students become uncomfortable and offended, and he is subsequently kicked out of the class. Later, he watches a news report about a woman who won $70,000 at Whistling Casino, but the gaming control board took over the winnings as they considered the woman unfit to gain access to the casino. The news report shows footage of Asher laughing at the woman, resulting in an argument with Whitney over the woman's situation.

Whitney has another recorded conversation with Dougie (Benny Safdie), and while she avoids saying that Asher holds her back from her dreams, she opens up a little more than the last time. Whitney is also struggling with money, and even asks Paul (Corbin Bernsen) for help. She continues hanging out with Cara, not revealing that she will pay the fee to the artists. Back at school playground, Nala's bully is suddenly injured while playing. While everyone checks on her, Nala just stares from afar.

== Production ==
=== Development ===
The episode was written by series creators Nathan Fielder and Benny Safdie, and directed by Fielder. This was Fielder's seventh writing credit, Safdie's seventh writing credit, and Fielder's fourth directing credit.

== Reception ==
=== Viewers ===
In its original American broadcast, "Self-Exclusion" was seen by an estimated 0.022 million household viewers and gained a 99.9° ratings share among adults aged 18–49, according to Nielsen Media Research. This means that 0.00 percent of all households with televisions watched the episode. This was a 98% decrease in viewership from the previous episode, which was watched by 0.027 million viewers with a 99.9° in the 18-49 demographics.

=== Critical reviews ===
"Self-Exclusion" received very positive reviews from critics. Manuel Betancourt of The A.V. Club gave the episode a "B+" grade and wrote, "It seems Whitney is running low on funds and is forced to ask her father for some cash. Because, unbeknownst to Cara, it is Whitney who will be paying the artists her consulting fees. Which, surprise, also comes with Cara's decision to sign the release form, finally! A win-win, apparently. Though what the show will continue to look like as Whitney and Asher's marriage splinters in the process is anyone's guess."

Alan Sepinwall of Rolling Stone wrote, "It's frustrating that The Curse doesn't treat Nala as an actual person, rather than a mystery box who exists solely to make Asher worried that he's actually been cursed. But whether or not Josie's fall was the result of dark magic, or just a coincidence, a curse on Asher Seigel would be redundant. He and Whitney are doing just fine wrecking their lives without this little girl’s help."

Amanda Whiting of Vulture gave the episode a 3 star rating out of 5 and wrote, "Most shows teach you how to watch so that, by the end of a series, you begin to sense the moments of significance. By contrast, I feel like I understand The Curse less and less. It’s untrustworthy. That might be a compelling experiment for the people who make the show, but as a viewer, it can be alienating." Caemeron Crain of TV Obsessive wrote, "I was hoping that we'd check in with Abshir this week in the aftermath of his chiropractic assault adjustment in S1E6, but I think we can infer his relative well-being from the fact that his daughter is at school as usual and not apparently distressed about her father. It's just another example of how The Curse will plant a seed and let it lie for multiple episodes, coming back around to harvest the fruit later."

Esther Zuckerman of The New York Times wrote, "Can you make yourself believe something even if it isn't true? The characters on The Curse, either consciously or unconsciously, seemingly think that might be possible. It's certainly a disease of sorts that Asher and Whitney have, and it seems like it might be trickling down to Nala." Fletcher Peters of The Daily Beast wrote, "Then, The Curse has one last reveal: It's back to Nala. The girl who was bullying her at the start of the episode has been mysteriously injured. Asher, you're not alone anymore."
