= Green Queen =

- The Curse episode
- Episode no.: Episode 10
- Directed by: Nathan Fielder
- Written by: Nathan Fielder; Benny Safdie
- Cinematography by: Maceo Bishop
- Editing by: Adam Locke-Norton
- Original release date: January 14, 2024
- Running time: 69 minutes

Guest appearances
- Vincent Pastore as himself; Barkhad Abdi as Abshir; Rachael Ray as herself

Episode chronology
← Previous "Young Hearts"	Next → —

"Green Queen" is the tenth episode and series finale of the American television satire black comedy The Curse. The episode was written by series creators Nathan Fielder and Benny Safdie and directed by Fielder. It originally aired on streaming and on-demand for all Showtime and Paramount+ with Showtime subscribers on January 12, 2024, before making its on-air debut on Showtime on January 14, 2024. The episode was screened at the Film at Lincoln Center.

The series follows Whitney and Asher Siegel, a newly married couple as they try to conceive a child while co-starring on their problematic new HGTV show, Fliplanthropy. Also joining them on their show is Dougie Schecter, a producer who is trying to make the best possible version of the show in order to reach a wider audience. In the episode, Asher and Whitney are now expecting their first child, just as Green Queen has been renewed for a second season.

The episode received critical acclaim, with critics praising the episode's ambition, directing, originality and absurdist humor. Some critics, however, debated on the closure to the storylines.

== Plot ==
During her talk show, Rachael Ray introduces Whitney (Emma Stone) and Asher (Nathan Fielder) as her guests, with Whitney in the late stage of pregnancy. She asks them about their tactics for Green Queen, challenging them over the effectiveness of their show, which is only available on streaming. Eventually, Rachael loses interest and goes back to cooking lessons with guest star Vincent Pastore.

While the series has been renewed for a second season, Whitney is frustrated with the small viewership, a feeling compounded by the knowledge that Cara has been profiled by The New York Times after quitting her career as an artist. The house at Questa Lane has been finished, and instead of giving it to an interested buyer, Asher decides to give it to Abshir (Barkhad Abdi) for free. When the two go to tell Abshir of their decision, expecting him to be thrilled and grateful, he is instead disinterested and seems more concerned with having to pay property taxes.

One morning, Whitney wakes up shocked to discover Asher floating on the bedroom ceiling. Asher initially believes this is due to an air pressure irregularity caused by the passive house design. The two struggle and fail to get Asher down, and it becomes clear that gravity has reversed direction for him. As the stress of the situation mounts, Whitney begins going into labor.

Asher makes his way out of the house, but is still forced to stay in an overhang. They call Whitney's doula, Moses (Elliot Berlin), for help, but in trying to pull Asher down, he accidentally lets him fly into a tree. Asher is left clinging to a branch as Moses is forced to take Whitney to the hospital. He calls Dougie (Benny Safdie) to stay with Asher as the fire department arrives. Dougie, having no knowledge of what is happening to Asher, believes he is running away from his parental responsibilities, and calls a cameraman to film the situation with a drone. The firefighters try to get Asher to let go of the tree, ignoring Asher's erratic behavior and claims.

As Whitney is checked at the hospital, she is told she will need a C-section. Back at the house, the firefighters start sawing the branch, despite Asher's desperate pleas to stop. When it is chopped, Asher shoots into the sky, shocking Dougie and the firefighters. As Whitney gives birth at the hospital, Asher continues flying upward while Dougie cries back in the street, taking responsibility for Asher's fate by having previously cursed him. Asher is finally seen floating lifeless in space. The camera floats from the hospital back to the Siegel house, where neighbors who witnessed the events decide that it must have been a stunt for the couple's TV show.

== Production ==
=== Development ===
The episode was written by series creators Nathan Fielder and Benny Safdie, and directed by Fielder. This was Fielder's tenth writing credit, Safdie's tenth writing credit, and Fielder's seventh directing credit.

== Reception ==
=== Critical reviews ===
"Green Queen" received critical acclaim. Manuel Betancourt of The A.V. Club gave the episode an "A" grade and wrote, "The Curse goes out not with a bang, but with a whimper. Still, it's one that feels so weighted with emotion that it's hard to ignore—and harder still to shake off. What a masterful ending, truly. One that equally exaggerated the surreal world Safdie and Fielder (and Stone, in turn) had created and yet stayed true to it."

Amanda Whiting of Vulture gave the episode a 3 star rating out of 5 and wrote, "What does it mean for television to reach a satisfying conclusion? What did we want from the final moments of The Curse? It was a comprehensively batshit series that made few promises from week to week. It ended as it began, which is how it always was: a soup of famous and semi-famous names goading us to watch, then refusing to be watchable. Dare followed by double dare. I hated it. It was fine. I laughed a good amount."

Devan Coggan of Entertainment Weekly wrote, "We're not even halfway through January, but The Curse might have just aired the weirdest TV finale you'll see all year... or any year." Esther Zuckerman of The New York Times wrote, "All I know is that the final episode of this first season (but perhaps not the only season) of The Curse is one of the most bonkers, baffling, creative and I think brilliant episodes of television I've watched in a long time, the kind of thing that challenges what TV can do."

Fletcher Peters of The Daily Beast wrote, "In a world full of bonkers TV series, The Curse reigns supreme by living up to its name — perhaps Asher was, indeed, cursed by Nala. How else do you explain floating into the sky to your death other than supernatural forces praying for your downfall, or rather, the absolute opposite? The Curse was real." Naomi Fry of The New Yorker wrote, "even though the circumstances of his death are cruel, there is something deeply humanistic, even hopeful, about the turn The Curse takes. The world might not want Asher's sudden honesty about who and what he is, and it certainly doesn't want his altruism, however genuine it may be, which is why he is sent hurtling into the stratosphere — a sign that he has become, if not a saint, then at least the universe's cuck. But as a sacrifice Asher is finally able to do some real good, by forcing the terrible people around him to realize and admit their own failings."

Other reviews were more negative. Alan Sepinwall of Rolling Stone wrote, "Since I first watched 'Green Queen' in the fall, I've revisited it several times, and thought about it often in between. It's a credit to the previous episodes, and perhaps to just how unexpected this conclusion was, that I haven't been able to entirely get it out of my head. Or maybe I just can't let go of my exasperation that this long, difficult, but at times very rewarding journey somehow led us... here. The Curse definitely goes to extreme lengths at the end, but ones that mostly invite questions about what the point of any of it was." Paolo Ragusa of Consequence wrote, "The Curse has been a charged, nuanced experiment that played with the aesthetics of performance, surveillance, the power imbalances of colonialism, and the damaging consequences of unchecked white guilt. But rather than ending with a visceral moment of clarity, we’re left staring straight back into The Curse's warped mirror, as all meaning drifts up into the sky."
