= Under the Big Tree =

- The Curse episode
- Episode no.: Episode 4
- Directed by: David Zellner; Nathan Zellner
- Written by: Nathan Fielder; Benny Safdie
- Cinematography by: Maceo Bishop
- Editing by: Stacy Moon
- Original release date: December 3, 2023
- Running time: 53 minutes

Guest appearances
- Hikmah Warsame as Nala; Dahabo Ahmed as Hani; Christopher Calderon as Fernando; Barkhad Abdi as Abshir

Episode chronology
← Previous "Questa Lane"	Next → "It's a Good Day"

"Under the Big Tree" is the fourth episode of the American television satire black comedy The Curse. The episode was written by series creators Nathan Fielder and Benny Safdie and directed by David Zellner and Nathan Zellner. It originally aired on streaming and on-demand for all Showtime and Paramount+ with Showtime subscribers on December 1, 2023, before making its on-air debut on Showtime on December 3, 2023. The episode was screened at the Film at Lincoln Center.

The series follows Whitney and Asher Siegel, a newly married couple as they try to conceive a child while co-starring on their problematic new HGTV show, Fliplanthropy. Also joining them on their show is Dougie Schecter, a producer who is trying to make the best possible version of the show in order to reach a wider audience. In the episode, Fliplanthropy is picked up for a 10-episode season, but Whitney and Asher face different challenges. Meanwhile, Dougie wakes up in a field, with no memory of how he got there.

The episode received very positive reviews from critics, who praised the performances (particularly Benny Safdie), writing and character development.

== Plot ==
Dougie (Benny Safdie) is called by Martha, a HGTV representative, who informs him that Fliplanthropy has been officially picked up for 10 episodes. However, Dougie finds himself in a landscape alongside two empty cars, as well as the words "under the big tree" written on his hand, with no idea of how he got there. He checks the area, struggling to find clues. Eventually, he discovers a bag under a tree containing the keys to the cars. The bag also contains two notes with the names Kalvin and Wyatt, along with designated hours.

Whitney (Emma Stone) and Asher (Nathan Fielder) are delighted to hear the pilot has been picked up, but they are facing new problems around the community. One of these involves Vic (Alexander Poncio), their first buyer, who is complaining that his packages have been getting stolen ever since he moved into the house. Vic refuses to be involved with his neighbors, which goes against Whitney's plan in building a community. Asher continues visiting Abshir (Barkhad Abdi) and Nala (Hikmah Warsame) to perform renovations on the house, although his visits are actually just to check whether "the curse" has been lifted or not.

Seeing Fernando (Christopher Calderon) with the rifle, Whitney has reservations and has the owner instruct him not to bring weapons to work. Dougie continues investigating the events at the field, eventually discovering that he had bought alcohol for two teenagers the night before. Still haunted by his role in his wife's death, Dougie decided to hold the car keys to prevent them from getting in an accident. He has a conversation with Asher, convinced that he might be cursed as well. As he starts opening up about his wife's death, he stops mid-sentence and leaves the room.

To improve his image, Asher attends a corporate comedy class. The speaker asks the class to perform a joke entirely through pantomime, and everyone will support each other regardless of the joke's delivery. While the class successfully performs, Asher, whose performance consists of making a face and a loud noise, is the only one to not make anyone laugh.

== Production ==
=== Development ===
The episode was written by series creators Nathan Fielder and Benny Safdie, and directed by David Zellner and Nathan Zellner. This was Fielder's fourth writing credit, Safdie's fourth writing credit, and the Zellners' third directing credit.

== Reception ==
=== Critical reviews ===
"Under the Big Tree" received very positive reviews from critics. Manuel Betancourt of The A.V. Club gave the episode a "B" grade and wrote, "I know The Curse is supposed to be a comedy (and it's a cringe-inducing one at that), but can we talk about how every episode turns up the Lynchian vibes to give us plenty of scary moments that will haunt us for a good long while? 'Under The Big Tree' ends on one of those moments. For there is nothing scarier, I find, than Asher trying to be 'funny.' And yes, that demands to be put in quotation marks because my god can Asher only ever approximate what it means to be actually funny. He’s sometimes like an AI simulation of an awkward regular guy, with all the glitches in human kinds of comedy as you'd expect."

Alan Sepinwall of Rolling Stone wrote, "If Asher can’t even generate a smile in that kind of friendly environment, then producing the remaining season of Fliplanthropy may not be the dream that anyone wants it to be."

Amanda Whiting of Vulture gave the episode a 4 star rating out of 5 and wrote, "Like in the previous episode, nothing much important happens in 'Under the Big Tree.' The episode mostly serves to develop the character of Dougie, which it does in a series of perfectly pitched details." Caemeron Crain of TV Obsessive wrote, "Beyond his own attempt, which is clearly over-thought, it's worth noting that he doesn't laugh at anyone else's. He's immediately in his head, thinking about how to navigate this social situation, and that’s his problem in general."

Esther Zuckerman of The New York Times wrote, "Of course, I found this incredibly amusing, so much so that I wanted to view it again and again, which is maybe the essential conundrum of the character and of Nathan Fielder's comedy in general. Depending on your perspective, it is either very funny or somewhat horrifying." Fletcher Peters of The Daily Beast wrote, "The unfunny mope sits in a group of wannabe funny people, all trying to make each other laugh without speaking as a warm-up before class. Asher, of course, breaks the rules, making both a strange face and loud noise. No one laughs. It's an uncomfortable moment that feels uniquely Nathan Fielder — in fact, I wouldn't mind watching an entire series dedicated to boring people in comedy classes."
