= Down and Dirty (The Curse) =

- The Curse episode
- Episode no.: Episode 8
- Directed by: Nathan Fielder
- Story by: Nathan Fielder; Benny Safdie; Carrie Kemper
- Teleplay by: Nathan Fielder; Benny Safdie
- Cinematography by: Maceo Bishop
- Editing by: Benny Safdie
- Original release date: December 31, 2023
- Running time: 58 minutes

Guest appearances
- Hikmah Warsame as Nala; Dahabo Ahmed as Hani; Christopher Calderon as Fernando; Barkhad Abdi as Abshir

Episode chronology
← Previous "Self-Exclusion"	Next → "Young Hearts"

"Down and Dirty" is the eighth episode of the American television satire black comedy The Curse. The episode was written by series creators Nathan Fielder and Benny Safdie, from a story by Fielder, Safdie and co-executive producer Carrie Kemper, and directed by Fielder. It originally aired on streaming and on-demand for all Showtime and Paramount+ with Showtime subscribers on December 29, 2023, before making its on-air debut on Showtime on December 31, 2023. The episode was screened at the Film at Lincoln Center.

The series follows Whitney and Asher Siegel, a newly married couple as they try to conceive a child while co-starring on their problematic new HGTV show, Fliplanthropy. Also joining them on their show is Dougie Schecter, a producer who is trying to make the best possible version of the show in order to reach a wider audience. In the episode, Whitney continues hanging out with Cara, while Asher goes on a night out with Dougie.

According to Nielsen Media Research, the episode was seen by an estimated 0.025 million household viewers and gained a 0.00 ratings share among adults aged 18–49. The episode received positive reviews from critics, who praised the performances and humor, although some were frustrated with the episode's structure.

== Plot ==
Asher (Nathan Fielder) and Whitney (Emma Stone) are confronted at gunpoint by Fernando (Christopher Calderon), angry at Whitney for her failure to do anything regarding the shoplifters. Asher fails in standing up for Whitney, prompting her to mock him for his personality and failure in proving himself.

Whitney once again visits Cara (Nizhonniya Luxi Austin), who is on a date with a man named Brett (Brett Mooswa). Brett uses the opportunity to make fun of Whitney, who is unaware of his jokes. Later, Whitney and Cara attend an art gallery hosted by a military contractor. Whitney decides to use the opportunity to film a segment, embarrassing her and Cara. Desperate to prove her value to the guests, Whitney stages a fake conversation with Cara to highlight her achievements, styling herself as an artist on camera. Cara reluctantly goes forward with the idea and makes little effort to complement Whitney's project. When Whitney asks about the meaning behind Cara's exhibition, Cara explains the turkey slices represent pieces of her exploited as a native person, and makes emphasis to Whitney that she chose to eat the turkey. Whilst Whitney is in praise of Cara's explanation, she drives home sullen.

After a humiliating recording where Dougie (Benny Safdie) reveals Asher's personal secrets in front of the show's film crew, Dougie decides to take Asher out for the night. They dine at a restaurant, where Asher apologizes for not being a better friend to him while Dougie continues mocking him. As they drive back, they decide to visit Abshir (Barkhad Abdi) and Nala (Hikmah Warsame), where Dougie asks Nala to "curse" him as well. When Nala refuses, Dougie breaks down and Nala cries out for her father, forcing Asher to get themselves out of the house. Later, when Abshir asks Nala why she cried out for him, she withholds the truth and says that when Dougie started crying, she thought he needed help. On the drive home from Abshir's, both Dougie and Asher accuse each other of being a bad person. When Asher goes home, Dougie "curses" him.

== Production ==
=== Development ===
The episode was written by series creators Nathan Fielder and Benny Safdie from a story by Fielder, Safdie and Carrie Kemper, and directed by Fielder. This was Fielder's eighth writing credit, Safdie's eighth writing credit, Kemper's second writing credit, and Fielder's fifth directing credit.

== Reception ==
=== Viewers ===
In its original American broadcast, "Down and Dirty" was seen by an estimated 0.025 million household viewers and gained a 0.00 ratings share among adults aged 18–49, according to Nielsen Media Research. This means that 0.00 percent of all households with televisions watched the episode. This was a 13% increase in viewership from the previous episode, which was watched by 0.022 million viewers with a 0.00 in the 18-49 demographics.

=== Critical reviews ===
"Down and Dirty" received positive reviews from critics. Manuel Betancourt of The A.V. Club gave the episode a "B" grade and wrote, "Even as she tries to create a picture-perfect version of herself, she runs up against the reality of her blind spots. It's that realization we're left with as Whitney fumes quietly in her car heading home. Will she ever be able to better control her image, her marriage, and her life?"

Alan Sepinwall of Rolling Stone wrote, "This all seems likely to end badly for them. Let's just hope the individual pieces fit together better than they did in this episode."

Amanda Whiting of Vulture gave the episode a 4 star rating out of 5 and wrote, "Whitney is obsessed with positioning herself centerstage where everyone can see her and yet, ultimately, she's terrified to be looked at. Afraid, perhaps, that they'll perceive the cold and ugly heart she just revealed to Asher — that an eye-roll or a dagger will come out instead of a platitude." Caemeron Crain of TV Obsessive wrote, "It's a pretty clear symbol of how the Siegels relate to Native culture, both insofar as they're profaning the sacred by making a god a brand and insofar as the Wyandot are indigenous to the Northeast, not the Southwest. Also this seems worth noting on background when it comes to how Cara and Brett view them."

Esther Zuckerman of The New York Times wrote, "The episode brings into focus just how transactional Asher's and Whitney's relationships are. Even their marriage is one of convenience. And we're confronted once again with just how poisonous Asher and Whitney are to the people in their presence." Fletcher Peters of The Daily Beast wrote, "This jeans situation has gotten out of hand on The Curse. Or rather, should I say, it's getting out of store, because that's where all the jeans are going. OK, bad joke. But it's better than anything Asher would've come up with. Low bar to set, but still."
