= Questa Lane =

- The Curse episode
- Episode no.: Episode 3
- Directed by: David Zellner; Nathan Zellner
- Written by: Nathan Fielder; Benny Safdie
- Cinematography by: Maceo Bishop
- Editing by: Adam Locke-Norton
- Original release date: November 26, 2023
- Running time: 48 minutes

Guest appearances
- Hikmah Warsame as Nala; Dahabo Ahmed as Hani; Christopher Calderon as Fernando; Barkhad Abdi as Abshir

Episode chronology
← Previous "Pressure's Looking Good So Far"	Next → "Under the Big Tree"

"Questa Lane" is the third episode of the American television satire black comedy The Curse. The episode was written by series creators Nathan Fielder and Benny Safdie, and directed by David Zellner and Nathan Zellner. It originally aired on streaming and on-demand for all Showtime and Paramount+ with Showtime subscribers on November 24, 2023, before making its on-air debut on Showtime on November 26, 2023. The episode was screened at the 2023 New York Film Festival.

The series follows Whitney and Asher Siegel, a newly married couple as they try to conceive a child while co-starring on their problematic new HGTV show, Fliplanthropy. Also joining them on their show is Dougie Schecter, a producer who is trying to make the best possible version of the show in order to reach a wider audience. In the episode, Asher buys a new property, reconnecting with Nala. Meanwhile, Whitney receives bad news about an establishment, which could negatively impact the pilot's prospects.

According to Nielsen Media Research, the episode was seen by an estimated 0.033 million household viewers and gained a 0.00 ratings share among adults aged 18–49. The episode received positive reviews from critics, who praised the performances, themes and re-focus on the main storyline, although some criticized the pacing.

== Plot ==
At an auction, Asher (Nathan Fielder) bids $62,500 for another property for the company's portfolio. Dougie (Benny Safdie) then shows Asher and Whitney (Emma Stone) footage of a focus group reviewing the pilot. The group is mixed on the format, but they also view Asher and Whitney as boring hosts, disappointing them.

Asher checks on the property, forced to use a drill to open the closed door. He finds Nala (Hikmah Warsame) with her sister Hani (Dahabo Ahmed), recognizing her as the girl who "cursed" him. He tries to give the $100 bill back, but the girls flee. Asher is forced to chase them through the neighborhood, until a man stops him and calls the police. An officer corroborates Asher's ownership of the property, and questions Nala's father, Abshir (Barkhad Abdi). Seeing that Abshir and Nala are squatting as they are unable to pay rent to the previous owner, Asher agrees to allow them to continue living rent-free for one year. As Asher and Whitney inspect the home, Nala explains that when she cursed Asher, she wished for the chicken to go missing from his dinner. Recalling that his meal kit had arrived without chicken shortly after meeting Nala, Asher begins to worry about the legitimacy of the curse.

Whitney receives her injection to stop the ectopic pregnancy, and is told that she cannot have sex for one month. Later, she learns that Barrier Coffee, one of the show's sponsors, has closed down without notifying them. Whitney is forced to meet with Fernando (Christopher Calderon), who is now out of job after being promised employment at the coffee shop. Whitney offers him a new job as a security guard. That night, he shows up at the abandoned establishment and stands watch with a gun.

At home, Asher helps Whitney when she has difficulty taking off her sweater. They laugh at the situation, and Whitney suggests recording it so she can upload it to Instagram and boost their image. However, the attempt at recreating it proves fruitless, and leads to an argument as Asher feels Whitney does not support him. They go to bed, with Whitney rewatching the argument on her phone, which was accidentally left on after they failed in recreating the event.

== Production ==
=== Development ===
The episode was written by series creators Nathan Fielder and Benny Safdie, and directed by David Zellner and Nathan Zellner. This was Fielder's third writing credit, Safdie's third writing credit, and the Zellners' second directing credit.

== Reception ==
=== Viewers ===
In its original American broadcast, "Questa Lane" was seen by an estimated 0.033 million household viewers and gained a 0.00 ratings share among adults aged 18–49, according to Nielsen Media Research. This means that 0.00 percent of all households with televisions watched the episode. This was a slight decrease in viewership from the previous episode, which was watched by 0.045 million viewers with a 0.01 in the 18-49 demographics.

=== Critical reviews ===
"Questa Lane" received positive reviews from critics. Manuel Betancourt of The A.V. Club gave the episode a "B" grade and wrote, "These are the mental acrobatics you'd expect Asher and Whitney Siegel to be grappling with as their plan to artificially inflate the real estate market in La Española through their not-yet-picked-up-to-series HGTV “passive home” reno show depends on the idea that they're giving back to the community. Yet the moral quandary over their callous ways don't quite bother them as much as pettier things. But it's in that disparity that Showtime's The Curse mines much of its dark comedy and its biting social commentary. Asher and Whitney are textbook white saviors who, by definition, can't think of themselves as such. Which is why they make for such fallible protagonists."

Alan Sepinwall of Rolling Stone wrote, "Even the real bit with the sweater seems more of an anomaly for them than how things usually go between them. But she wants no part of the real thing. It’s bad for business, and bad for the illusion Whitney has crafted for herself about her life. Focus groups are ridiculous in general, but they’re not always wrong."

Amanda Whiting of Vulture gave the episode a 3 star rating out of 5 and wrote, "Whitney's aim is to profit off the poor in order to redevelop homes for the rich in the hopes that the poor can find full-time work making their coffees one day. But it's already easy to see how our misunderstood Robin Hood will see it when the community turns on her: No good deed goes unpunished." Caemeron Crain of TV Obsessive wrote, "It's a small-scale version of a larger question The Curse is consistently asking: Do these people actually care about the social issues they claim to care about? Or, what's the difference between actually caring and pretending to care, other than the potential difference in effects?"

Esther Zuckerman of The New York Times wrote, "They have inflicted their own chaos upon people who never asked for their charity but are now reliant on it, because Asher and Whitney literally own their home. And while Asher is suspicious of Nala and her 'tiny curse,' Nala has far more reason to be suspicious of this man who can put her out on the street if he feels like it." Fletcher Peters of The Daily Beast wrote, "Maybe the fake, unfunny version of Asher won’t be a hit with audiences. Could this argumentative, possibly racist side of him be more interesting on TV? More importantly: Does Nala actually know how to curse people?"

IndieWire named "Questa Lane" the 20th best TV episode of 2023.
