= It's a Good Day (The Curse) =

- The Curse episode
- Episode no.: Episode 5
- Directed by: Nathan Fielder
- Written by: Nathan Fielder; Benny Safdie
- Cinematography by: Maceo Bishop
- Editing by: Adam Locke-Norton
- Original release date: December 10, 2023
- Running time: 53 minutes

Guest appearances
- Constance Shulman as Elizabeth; Dean Cain as Mark Rose; Christopher Calderon as Fernando; Nikki Dixon as Lucinda; Eric Peterson as Dennis; Corbin Bernsen as Paul

Episode chronology
← Previous "Under the Big Tree"	Next → "The Fire Burns On"

"It's a Good Day" is the fifth episode of the American television satire black comedy The Curse. The episode was written by series creators Nathan Fielder and Benny Safdie, and directed by Fielder. It originally aired on streaming and on-demand for all Showtime and Paramount+ with Showtime subscribers on December 8, 2023, before making its on-air debut on Showtime on December 10, 2023. The episode was screened at the Film at Lincoln Center.

The series follows Whitney and Asher Siegel, a newly married couple as they try to conceive a child while co-starring on their problematic new HGTV show, Fliplanthropy. Also joining them on their show is Dougie Schecter, a producer who is trying to make the best possible version of the show in order to reach a wider audience. In the episode, Whitney and Asher face problems as they try to find a new buyer for a house, recurring to many schemes.

According to Nielsen Media Research, the episode was seen by an estimated 0.015 million household viewers and gained a 0.00 ratings share among adults aged 18–49. The episode received very positive reviews from critics, who praised Emma Stone's performance and Whitney's character development.

== Plot ==
Whitney (Emma Stone) and Asher (Nathan Fielder) meet with a couple interested in one of Whitney's "passive" homes, and Whitney requires them to sign a document supporting the San Pedro Pueblo tribe's right to compensation for their land. However, the husband is not convinced by the house's cooling system and the wife refuses to sign the document, annoying Whitney and causing a heated argument. This causes the couple to pull out of the intended offer.

Still requiring buyers for Fliplanthropy, Dougie (Benny Safdie) suggests using actors for the season. Whitney brings in Cara (Nizhonniya Luxi Austin) as a fake buyer, but she treats the show as a joke and takes the opportunity to humiliate Whitney. Whitney then resorts to asking strangers in the street to help, and identifies a man and a woman to play a couple even though they are not married. The man insists on bringing his actual girlfriend, resulting in an awkward filming session. Finally, Asher decides to get one of Whitney's previous prospective buyers, Mark (Dean Cain), to purchase the home for the show. Whitney has reservations about Mark having a Blue Lives Matter sticker on his car, but he turns out to be enthusiastic about the house and deeply passionate about the passive home concept, while also espousing support for the Pueblo and a total willingness to sign their petition, as his great-grandmother was Apache.

While Whitney is unhappy over Mark's ideologies, she begrudgingly agrees to sell to him. Asher and Whitney return home, and while Asher is delighted over the news, Whitney is very distant in her answers. As they prepare for bed, Whitney dismisses Asher's advances.

== Production ==
=== Development ===
The episode was written by series creators Nathan Fielder and Benny Safdie, and directed by Fielder. This was Fielder's fifth writing credit, Safdie's fifth writing credit, and Fielder's second directing credit.

== Reception ==
=== Viewers ===
In its original American broadcast, "It's a Good Day" was seen by an estimated 0.015 million household viewers and gained a 0.00 ratings share among adults aged 18–49, according to Nielsen Media Research. This means that 0.00 percent of all households with televisions watched the episode.

=== Critical reviews ===
"It's a Good Day" received very positive reviews from critics. Manuel Betancourt of The A.V. Club gave the episode a "B+" grade and wrote, "There's a white guilt and white savior performance here but also a bit of an emptiness to such gestures. The Curse wants us to straddle the line between laughing at her and with her, the way the crew guy does, making us feel uncomfortable in knowing the tide can turn at any minute. And Stone really excels at embodying Whitney's righteousness with a twinge of self-importance that's wrapped in self-effacement."

Alan Sepinwall of Rolling Stone wrote, "She returns her husband's 'I love you,' but in the robotic tone of a woman who has put her life on autopilot, because the more she tries to think about situations, the worse she seems to make it. The focus group complained that Asher seemed to have no personality, but at least for a moment, those roles are reversed."

Amanda Whiting of Vulture gave the episode a 4 star rating out of 5 and wrote, "The Flipanthropy cameras are finally rolling again in Española. As bad as Asher is on TV — and he is excruciatingly clumsy and awkward — it's Whitney who wins the prize for insufferable character of the week. (The prize, to be clear, is my ire.)" Caemeron Crain of TV Obsessive wrote, "Benny Safdie is knocking it out of the park with this character, and by “knocking it out of the park” I mean making me feel deeply uncomfortable in a way I can’t quite put my finger on. We're halfway through this season of The Curse, and I can’t wait to see how things come together in the back half."

Esther Zuckerman of The New York Times wrote, "People are ultimately more complicated than Whitney would like to admit. Whitney is more complicated than she would like to admit." Fletcher Peters of The Daily Beast wrote, "“You’re my angel,” he coos to Whitney in bed. “You know that, right?” Disgusting, disgusting, disgusting!"
