= Down and dirty =

Down and dirty, Down & Dirty or Down and Dirty may refer to:

== Music ==
- Down & Dirty (band), a musical group fronted by Denis Stoff
- Down and Dirty (album), The Click album
- Down and Dirty Live, an album by Danger Danger
- "Down and Dirty", song from Quiet Riot's 1986 album QR III
- "Down and Dirty", song from the 1995 Bad Company album Company of Strangers
- "Down and Dirty", a song by Keyshia Cole from her 2005 album The Way It Is
- "Down & Dirty", a song by Little Mix from their 2016 album Glory Days

== Other uses ==
- Down and Dirty (film), 1976 film directed by Ettore Scola
- Down and Dirty (book), 1988 book in the Wild Cards anthology series
- Down 'n Dirty, 2000 film directed by and starring Fred Williamson
- Down and Dirty (The Curse), an episode of the TV series The Curse
- Down 'n Dirty, 2001 film featuring Gary Busey
- Down and Dirty, Richard Pryor album
- "Down and dirty", a term used in stud poker
