= Adrenaline (film) =

2015 American drama film

- Directed by: Joseph Quinn Simpkins
- Written by: Micheal Rosander; Alex Chatfield; Joseph Quinn Simpkins
- Starring: John Schneider; Charlene Amoia; Gregory Alan Williams; Cameron Arnett; Myke Holmes
- Release date: 2015
- Language: English

Adrenaline is a 2015 American drama film directed by Joseph Quinn Simpkins and written by Michael Rosander, Alex Chatfield and Simpkins. It stars John Schneider, Charlene Amoia, Gregory Alan Williams, Cameron Arnett and Myke Holmes. The film centers around a drag racer who is left paraplegic by a car crash.

== Plot ==
- The film centers around a drag racer who is left paraplegic by a car crash.

== Cast ==
- Charlene Amoia as Josie Rigsby
- Gregory Alan Williams as Elijah Benjamin Salisbury
- Jim Cody Williams as Britt Brizzio
- Malaika Washington as Tiffany
- John Schneider as Paul Sharpe
- Irene Santiago as Diane Godwin
- Michael Rosander as Joseph Jenkins
- Anthony Reynolds as Jason Skynard
- Timmy Richardson as Miles
- Samantha Katelyn as Cindy
- Myke Holmes as Trace Mallery
- R. Keith Harris as Marcus
- GiGi Erneta as Nurse Amy
