= Lizard Music =

Upcoming film directed by Benny Safdie

- Directed by: Benny Safdie
- Screenplay by: Benny Safdie; Ronald Bronstein
- Based on: Lizard Music by Daniel Pinkwater
- Produced by: Benny Safdie; Dwayne Johnson; David Koplan; Scott Stuber; Nick Nesbitt
- Starring: Dwayne Johnson; Theo Clark Leber; Tim Heidecker; Alicia Silverstone; Regina Hall; Andrew Dice Clay; Colman Domingo; Jeff Goldblum; Rachel McAdams; David Krumholtz; Raye
- Cinematography: Maceo Bishop
- Music by: Raye
- Production companies: United Artists; Seven Bucks Productions; Out for the Count; Magnetic Fields Entertainment
- Distributed by: Amazon MGM Studios
- Release date: December 25, 2027
- Country: United States
- Language: English

Lizard Music is an upcoming American fantasy adventure film directed by Benny Safdie, and based on the book of the same name by Daniel Pinkwater. It stars Dwayne Johnson, Theo Clark Leber, Tim Heidecker, Alicia Silverstone, Regina Hall, and Andrew Dice Clay, with the voices of Colman Domingo, Jeff Goldblum, Rachel McAdams, David Krumholtz, and Raye.

== Premise ==
A boy stumbles upon a secret late-night broadcast of lizards playing otherworldly music.

== Cast ==
- Dwayne Johnson as Chicken Man
- Theo Clark Leber as Victor
- Tim Heidecker
- Alicia Silverstone
- Regina Hall
- Arya Parvathi
- Andrew Dice Clay

Additionally, Colman Domingo, Jeff Goldblum, Rachel McAdams, David Krumholtz, and Raye have been cast in voice roles.

== Production ==
In September 2025, it was announced that Dwayne Johnson and Benny Safdie would reunite to work on an adaptation of Lizard Music, after working together on The Smashing Machine. Johnson recalled telling Safdie, "I'm your Chicken Man," after the film was pitched to him, and lost a lot of weight for the role. In October 2025, Amazon MGM Studios acquired rights to the project under its United Artists label, with Scott Stuber and Nick Nesbitt joining as producers. In July 2026, newcomers Theo Clark Leber and Arya Parvathi joined the cast, alongside Tim Heidecker, Alicia Silverstone and Regina Hall, the latter playing a friend and co-worker of Chicken Man. In September, Andrew Dice Clay was added to the cast. In October, Colman Domingo, Jeff Goldblum, Rachel McAdams, David Krumholtz, and Raye were added to the cast in voice roles, with Raye also composing original music for the film.

Principal photography began on August 3, 2026 and wrapped on October 23, 2026 in Brooklyn, NY at Coney Island/Brighton Beach. Maceo Bishop served as the cinematographer. To transform into a 70-year-old man, Johnson underwent five hours of makeup and prosthetic work per day.

== Release ==
Lizard Music is scheduled to be released in the United States on December 25, 2027.
