= The Curse (American TV series) =

American black comedy television series

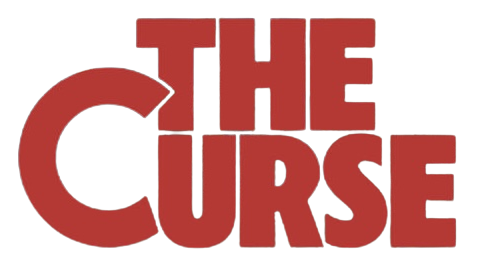
- Genre: Black comedy; Cringe comedy; Psychological thriller; Satire
- Created by: Nathan Fielder; Benny Safdie
- Written by: Nathan Fielder; Benny Safdie; Carrie Kemper
- Directed by: Nathan Fielder; Nathan Zellner; David Zellner
- Starring: Emma Stone; Nathan Fielder; Benny Safdie
- Music by: Daniel Lopatin; John Medeski
- Country of origin: United States
- Original language: English
- No. of seasons: 1
- No. of episodes: 10

Production
- Executive producers: Nathan Fielder; Benny Safdie; Emma Stone; Dave McCary; Josh Safdie; Ravi Nandan; Alli Reich; Ali Herting
- Producers: Joshua Bachove; Inman Young; Mary Beth Minthorn
- Production location: New Mexico
- Cinematography: Maceo Bishop
- Editors: Adam Locke-Norton; Stacy Moon; Benny Safdie
- Running time: 38–69 minutes
- Production companies: A24; Fruit Tree; Blow Out Productions; Elara; Showtime Studios

Original release
- Network: Showtime
- Release: November 12, 2023 – January 14, 2024

The Curse is an American satirical black comedy thriller television series created and written by Nathan Fielder and Benny Safdie, and starring Emma Stone, Fielder, and Safdie. It was filmed from June to October 2022 and premiered on streaming and on-demand for all Showtime and Paramount+ with Showtime subscribers on November 10, 2023, before making its on-air debut on Showtime on November 12. Its first three episodes premiered at the New York Film Festival on October 12, 2023. The series concluded on January 12, 2024, receiving generally positive reviews from critics.

== Premise ==
The series explores "How an alleged curse disturbs the relationship of a newly married couple as they try to conceive a child while co-starring on their problematic new HGTV show, Fliplanthropy."

== Cast and characters ==
=== Main ===
- Emma Stone as Whitney Siegel, Asher's wife and co-star of an HGTV show about passive homes
- Nathan Fielder as Asher Siegel, Whitney's husband and co-star of the HGTV show
- Benny Safdie as Dougie Schecter, the producer of the HGTV show and Asher's friend

=== Recurring ===
- Constance Shulman and Corbin Bernsen as Elizabeth and Paul, Whitney's slumlord parents
- Hikmah Warsame as Nala, a young girl who curses Asher
- Dahabo Ahmed as Hani, Nala's older sister
- Christopher Calderon as Fernando, an economically struggling local employed by Whitney
- Barkhad Abdi as Abshir, Nala and Hani's father
- Gary Farmer as James Toledo, Governor of the San Pedro Pueblo
- Nizhonniya Luxi Austin as Cara Durand, a Picuris Pueblo artist working with Whitney

=== Guest ===
- Dean Cain as Mark Rose, a home buyer
- GiGi Erneta as Martha, an HGTV executive
- Rachael Ray as herself
- Vincent Pastore as himself

== Episodes ==
No.	Title	Directed by	Written by	Original release date (Note: Every episode was released two days earlier on Paramount+ with Showtime.)	U.S. viewers (millions)
1	"Land of Enchantment"	Nathan Fielder	Nathan Fielder & Benny Safdie	November 12, 2023	0.058
Married couple Whitney and Asher Siegel work on the pilot for their Española, New Mexico-based HGTV show Fliplanthropy, which aims to use their property development company to help locals but is criticized for gentrifying the area. Asher snaps at interviewer Monica Perez when she brings up Whitney's parents Paul and Elizabeth's reputation as slumlords, and Perez agrees to not air the interview if he gives her proof of corruption on the gaming control board of his previous employer, the Whistling River Casino. Paul gives Asher advice on dealing with his micropenis. Asher is irritated to find chicken missing from his meal kit, and during sex, he roleplays being cuckolded while masturbating Whitney. Asher's friend and Fliplanthropy producer Dougie Schecter has him give a hundred dollar bill to Nala, a young street vendor, for B-roll, who "curses" him when he takes it back. Whitney sees the footage and demands he give her the money. He cannot find her at a nearby homeless shelter and gives the money to a nearby single mother, telling Whitney that Nala lifted the curse after he paid her.
2	"Pressure's Looking Good So Far"	David Zellner & Nathan Zellner	Story by : Nathan Fielder & Benny Safdie & Carrie Kemper; Teleplay by : Carrie Kemper	November 19, 2023	0.045
Asher clumsily infiltrates a Whistling River office and covertly downloads footage from pit boss Bill's computer. While on a date, Dougie tells the story of how his wife was killed in a drunk driving incident, though he denies responsibility due to being under the legal limit. He tests his blood alcohol content while driving his date home and realizes he is over the limit, walking her the rest of the way. Whitney attends Pueblo artist Cara Durand's gallery, but is bothered by a performance piece where Cara screams after Whitney eats a piece of turkey cut for her, then asks "why did you do that?" The Siegels are delighted to learn that Whitney is pregnant, but quickly discover that it is ectopic.
3	"Questa Lane"	David Zellner & Nathan Zellner	Nathan Fielder & Benny Safdie	November 26, 2023	0.033
Asher is bothered by a focus group's negative assessment of him during a pilot screening. He finds Nala and her family squatting in a recently purchased property, and he and Whitney agree to waive their rent for a year. Nala mentions cursing him as part of a TikTok trend, and Asher becomes paranoid when she explains she wished for the chicken to go missing from his dinner. One of the show's sponsors pulls out and leaves one of its subjects, Fernando, out of the job the Siegels promised him. Whitney employs him as security for their clothing store. Whitney and Asher share a humorous moment when her sweater gets stuck and he is forced to tear it off, but Whitney's attempt to recreate it on camera for Instagram prove dry and Asher is distracted with worries about the curse. Whitney accuses him of racism when he wonders if Nala went through their trash, and they argue, wherein he insists that she does not support him. Whitney ends the argument when she notices her phone is still recording and the couple goes to bed.
4	"Under the Big Tree"	David Zellner & Nathan Zellner	Nathan Fielder & Benny Safdie	December 3, 2023	N/A
Dougie awakens in a field and learns that Fliplanthropy has been picked up for a full season. He finds the keys to his car and the two abandoned ones next to him buried and drives to one of the addresses written on his hand, learning that he bought alcohol for the teen living there and his friends but withheld their keys to prevent an accident. He admits to Asher his fear that he may be cursed. One of the Siegels' homebuyers plans to install a gas stove, which violates the house's passive certification, and Asher unsuccessfully tries to steal the house's induction range. Whitney presses Asher to take a corporate comedy class, where he is the only one in a group exercise to not make anyone laugh.
5	"It's a Good Day"	Nathan Fielder	Nathan Fielder & Benny Safdie	December 10, 2023	0.015
Whitney lashes out at a couple who want to violate the passive certification by installing air conditioning and refuse to sign their support for Pueblo land rights, causing them to quit the show. Cara is brought in to pose as a buyer, but is intentionally disruptive and forms a rapport with Dougie. Fernando stops and calls the police on a shoplifter at the clothing store, and Whitney has the cashier charge her credit card for stolen items to prevent future police attention. Her parents come to say hello and she lashes out at them when they ask to have Paul's birthday party on one of the properties. Asher suggests contacting a previous prospective buyer, who Whitney is mistrustful of because of a Blue Lives Matter sticker on his car. He surprises her by being interested in passive housing and supportive of the Pueblo, and she later is cold with Asher after selling to the man.
6	"The Fire Burns On"	Nathan Fielder	Nathan Fielder & Benny Safdie	December 17, 2023	0.027
Whitney finds a cut of a Fliplanthropy episode uninteresting, so she and Dougie scheme to play up Asher's awkwardness and insert conflict between him and Whitney. He approves her idea of changing the title to Green Queen. While filming at a firehouse, Asher finds raw chicken in the bathroom sink and believes Dougie is pranking him, though surveillance footage reveal that he was not responsible. While trying to sabotage Dougie's budding relationship with Cara, Whitney sees in their texts that she is interested in a statue that offensively depicts an Indigenous caricature. Asher innocently asks Nala to guess how many screws he is hiding and she guesses them correctly, though she becomes upset when he squeezes nails in his hand so hard he cuts it.
7	"Self-Exclusion"	Nathan Fielder	Nathan Fielder & Benny Safdie	December 24, 2023	0.022
Nala tries to curse her school bully to fall off the climbing rope during gym class and is ignored by her teacher when she complains about her negative treatment. Whitney buys the statue and gives it to Cara, missing the point of her art being that she steals and repurposes racist products. Cara agrees to keep working on Green Queen when Whitney offers to hire her as a "consultant" for Indigenous depiction, and Whitney confesses her uncertainty with her marriage while filming with Dougie. Asher is kicked out of his class when the instructor pressures him to make a joke about his penis, which offends several students. Perez airs her story about Whistling River, where Asher is seen in the footage laughing over the board taking a woman's winnings, which he and Whitney argue about. Nala's bully trips and injures herself on the playground.
8	"Down and Dirty"	Nathan Fielder	Story by : Nathan Fielder & Benny Safdie & Carrie Kemper; Teleplay by : Nathan Fielder & Benny Safdie	December 31, 2023	0.025
Fernando confronts the Siegels on the increased petty crime Whitney's no-police policy has brought to Española, leaving Whitney disgusted when Asher weakly tries to stand up for her. He bumps into Bill in public, who ignores him. After Dougie presses Asher about his cuckold fetish on camera, they go out to dinner and drive to Nala's, where Dougie pleads with her to curse him when they are alone. As he starts to cry, a scared Nala calls for her father Abshir and Asher drags Dougie out. They argue as Dougie drives Asher home, and after Asher brings up Dougie's dead wife, Dougie curses him. Whitney and Cara attend an art gallery and Whitney decides to film in the house, staging a conversation where she praises Cara's art. When asked, Cara explains that her turkey piece was her cutting off bits of her Pueblo identity and giving it away, and later throws out the statue when she arrives home.
9	"Young Hearts"	Nathan Fielder	Nathan Fielder & Benny Safdie	January 7, 2024	0.034
An HGTV representative requests that the Siegels's marriage be shown positively, so Whitney takes Asher bowling. He runs into Bill, who explains he ignored him after believing he leaked to the press, though now believes it was someone else. Wanting to impress Whitney, Asher proudly declares himself the leaker. A Green Queen crew member is fired when he leaves a distasteful note on Whitney's car after his friend's relative is evicted from her parents' building. She confronts her parents, who point out the man was a bad tenant, and she takes their money without any issue. She and Asher watch a cut of a Green Queen episode, where she comments on him holding her back from her dreams. Shaken, he admits that he never gave Nala the money and that he is the real curse, tearfully promising to improve as she looks at him in stunned silence.
10	"Green Queen"	Nathan Fielder	Nathan Fielder & Benny Safdie	January 14, 2024	0.040
Whitney is later heavily pregnant and has stopped taking money from her parents, while her and Asher's marriage has improved. Green Queen has been renewed for a second season despite its middling reception. As a gift to Whitney, Asher gives an uninterested Abshir ownership of the property. The next morning, Asher wakes up to find himself stuck on the ceiling, as if gravity has reversed for him. Before they can figure out how to get him down, Whitney goes into labor. Her doula helps Asher out of the house, but loses his grip and gets him stuck on a tree branch. After the doula drives Whitney to the hospital, Dougie arrives and believes Asher is trying to avoid being a father. As Dougie films Asher panicking, the fire department attempts to get him down by cutting the branch off with a chainsaw, ignoring his pleas to stop. Asher is sent flying upwards and dies floating through space in the fetal position. Meanwhile, Whitney undergoes a caesarean section and holds her son while Dougie laugh/cries over Asher. As he explains the situation to the police, onlookers recognize Asher from TV and assume the incident was a stunt.

== Production ==
The Curse was created and written by Nathan Fielder and Benny Safdie, inspired by an anecdote Fielder told Safdie about moving from Canada to Los Angeles in 2009 where a woman asking for a handout replied "I curse you" after Fielder did not have money to give her. Fielder was bothered by her words and withdrew cash from an ATM, returned to the woman, and gave her twenty dollars, prompting her to declare the curse lifted. Fielder stated "I don't believe in that stuff, but I can't get those things out of my head. Sometimes if someone says something to you, even conversationally, where you feel like you messed up something, it can linger in your mind and grow and consume you. Then we just started riffing on that idea, like, 'Wouldn't it be interesting if that vibe was hanging over an entire show?'" Safdie said the series "started out as a 30-minute comedy and became an hour-long comedy-drama". The Curse received a pilot order by Showtime in February 2020.

In December 2020, Showtime ordered The Curse to series, with Emma Stone joining the cast. In July 2022, Corbin Bernsen, Barkhad Abdi and Constance Shulman joined the cast. Principal photography took place in Santa Fe and Española, New Mexico, from June to early October 2022. The original score for the series was composed and performed by frequent Safdie collaborator Daniel Lopatin and John Medeski. Additionally, the music of Alice Coltrane is featured heavily in the series.

== Reception ==
=== Critical response ===
On the review aggregator website Rotten Tomatoes, 93% of 74 critics' reviews are positive. The website's consensus reads: "A wickedly uncomfortable marriage of sensibilities between Nathan Fielder and Benny Safdie, with a masterful Emma Stone tying everything together, The Curse will make viewers cackle and squirm in equal measure." On Metacritic, the series has a weighted average score of 76 out of 100, based on 34 critics, indicating "generally favorable" reviews.

The Curse was named among the best TV shows of 2023 by Entertainment Weekly, IndieWire, Elle, Time, The A.V. Club, and The New Yorker.

Director Christopher Nolan described The Curse as "an incredible show" and likened it to Twin Peaks, The Prisoner, and The Singing Detective as "genuinely [having] no precedents" in television. Safdie said that Nolan texted him after the finale asking "How did you guys do that?" in regard to its stunts.

=== Themes and analysis ===
The show deals with subjects such as the artifice of reality television, gentrification, cultural appropriation, white privilege, Native American rights, sustainable capitalism, Judaism, pathological altruism, virtue signalling, marriage, and parenthood.

=== Accolades ===
Accolades for The Curse
Award	Date of ceremony	Category	Nominee(s)	Result	Ref.
Golden Globe Awards	January 7, 2024	Best Actress – Television Series Drama	Emma Stone	Nominated	
Independent Spirit Awards	February 25, 2024	Best Supporting Performance in a New Scripted Series	Benny Safdie	Nominated	
Writers Guild of America Awards	April 14, 2024	Drama Series	Carmen Christopher, Nathan Fielder, Alex Huggins, Carrie Kemper, Benny Safdie	Nominated	
Gotham TV Awards	June 4, 2024	Breakthrough Drama Series	Nathan Fielder, Benny Safdie, Ali Herting, Dave McCary, Ravi Nandan, Alli Reich, Josh Safdie, Emma Stone	Nominated	
Gotham TV Awards	June 4, 2024	Outstanding Performance in a Drama Series	Nathan Fielder	Nominated	
Gotham TV Awards	June 4, 2024	Outstanding Performance in a Drama Series	Emma Stone	Nominated	
Astra TV Awards	December 8, 2024	Best Cable Drama Series	The Curse	Nominated	
Astra TV Awards	December 8, 2024	Best Actress in a Cable Drama Series	Emma Stone	Nominated	
Astra TV Awards	December 8, 2024	Best Supporting Actor in a Broadcast Network or Cable Drama Series	Benny Safdie	Nominated	
Astra TV Awards	December 8, 2024	Best Guest Actor in a Drama Series	Corbin Bernsen	Nominated	
Astra TV Awards	December 8, 2024	Best Directing in a Broadcast Network or Cable Drama Drama Series	Nathan Fielder (for "Green Queen")	Nominated	
Astra TV Awards	December 8, 2024	Best Writing in a Broadcast Network or Cable Drama Series	Nathan Fielder and Benny Safdie (for "Land of Enchantment")	Nominated	
Satellite Awards	January 26, 2025	Best Comedy or Musical Series	The Curse	Nominated	
Satellite Awards	January 26, 2025	Best Actor in a Comedy or Musical Series	Nathan Fielder	Nominated	
Satellite Awards	January 26, 2025	Best Actress in a Comedy or Musical Series	Emma Stone	Won	
Satellite Awards	January 26, 2025	Best Actor in a Supporting Role in a Series, Miniseries & Limited Series, or Motion Picture Made for Television	Benny Safdie	Nominated	
Artios Awards	February 12, 2025	Outstanding Achievement in Casting – Television Pilot and First Season Drama	Angelique Midthunder, Jennifer Venditti, Tara Mazzucca, Victoria Cadwallader, Jennifer Schwalenberg	Nominated	

== Future ==
In a January 2024 interview, Safdie addressed the possibility of a second season, saying, "It's not off the table. There are ideas, but it's definitely too premature to put them out into the world." In April 2024, Fielder stated that "there definitely could be" another season, and "from the start, we had it mapped out beyond the first season".
