= Love and Cameras in America =

First feature-length Nathan Fielder documentary film

- Directed by: Nathan Fielder
- Written by: Nathan Fielder; Chris Locke; Tim McAuliffe
- Produced by: Susan E. MacDonald
- Starring: Nathan Fielder; Ashley Larson
- Cinematography: Kevin Doyle; Mark Hammond; Mark Mullane; Gregoire Valcour
- Release dates: September 20, 2009 (Atlantic Film Festival); November 18, 2026 (YouTube)
- Running time: 101 minutes

Love and Cameras in America is a 2008 Canadian documentary film written, edited, and directed by Nathan Fielder in his feature directorial debut. The film follows Fielder as he travels across the United States interviewing voters ahead of the 2008 U.S. presidential election.

== Synopsis ==
The film opens with Nathan Fielder explaining that, having previously made only short films, he was approached by a producer in Halifax to make a feature-length documentary about the 2008 United States presidential election. He begins interviewing members of the public about politics and the upcoming election, though his conversations often stray from the intended subject. Among his early encounters are a group of men sitting on a bench and a young woman selling Cutco knives. Another interviewee repeatedly insists that she and Fielder exchange contact information in case he'd like to arrange a follow-up interview or if she'd like to inquire about the film's status.

Fielder subsequently organizes a five person focus group in which two participants volunteer to act as presidential candidates; two are appointed as their campaign managers, and the final volunteer, a 20-year-old man named Daniel, represents the voting public. After the mock candidates give campaign speeches, Daniel casts his vote.

During another street interview, Fielder meets Ashley, a young woman he initially speaks to about her thoughts on the election. Fielder obtains her contact information in case he'd like to arrange a follow-up interview. The two begin spending time together. During a ride to the zoo, Ashley discusses her background in theater, and the pair rehearse lines from a play in which she has been cast as a German character. Ashley tells Fielder she's supposed to learn a German accent for the role. At the zoo, they exchange jokes and talk about elephants.

Between these encounters with Ashley, Fielder continues filming political and social interactions. Outside the White House, an interview about Iraq is interrupted by an Austin Powers impersonator. Fielder also attempts to speak to a man at a gas station about rising prices but is turned away.

Expressing frustration with the difficult of approaching strangers, he turns to interviewing experts, including a historian specializing in voting, an etiquette and image consultant, and a former lobbyist turned musical political satirist. The film also documents Fielder appearing on a radio program and visiting Daniel at his home for a tour.

Meanwhile, Fielder's interactions with Ashley become an increasingly prominent part of the documentary. They sit on the beach and discuss her thoughts on theater, film, and her prospective acting career.

During another meeting, Fielder performs a card trick for Ashley. He then confides in her that the documentary has begun to stray from its original political subject. He describes briefly meeting Barack Obama at a campaign rally in West Virginia, where he was able to ask the candidate whether he would change America and received the response, "I'm doing my best." Unsure how to incorporate the encounter into the film now that its scope has shifted, Fielder asks Ashley whether he should include the footage at all. She suggests placing it at the very end.

During a picnic in the park, Ashley tells Fielder a lengthy joke involving a Chinese character, imitating an accent to deliver the punchline. Fielder points out the joke's racist nature, prompting an uncomfortable exchange that causes Ashley to become embarrassed and defensive.

On another day, while the two are sitting in the car, Ashley mentions that her necklace was Christmas gift from her longtime boyfriend. Fielder, seemingly surprised by the revelation, abruptly leaves the car and ends production for the day.

The film concludes with the footage from the campaign rally, previously described by Fielder to Ashley. After Obama's speech, Fielder stands on a chair and raises his hand in an attempt to attract the candidate's attention. He makes his way through the crowd to the then-candidate. Fielder asks, "Are you going to change America?" Obama replies, "I'm doing my best." The two shake hands. The song "No I In Threesome" by Interpol plays over the scene and through the credits.

== Production ==
Michael Donovan began working with Nathan Fielder through his YouTube videos. This led to Fielder's appearances on This Hour Has 22 Minutes, as well as the production of Love and Cameras in America.

The film wasn't produced with help from Canadian Broadcasting Corporation (CBC). However, the camera crew claimed to be associated with the CBC several times while on set.

The film was shot without a script. The structure of interviews was that Fielder would begin with simple questions, while building to a punchline. In order to accentuate the awkward atmosphere, interviews were often filmed inside subjects' homes. On several occasions, after an interview went poorly, the filming crew would claim to not be familiar with Fielder personally.

Following shooting days, the production crew would typically hang out at local bars in Arlington County. However, Fielder didn't attend these gatherings, instead staying in his hotel room to work on the film.

After the production finished, the material was originally compiled into Nathan Fielder’s U.S. Election Special, which aired on CTV Comedy Channel. While it was intended to be a pitch for a new series, the pitch failed. Following this, the footage was expanded and edited into Love and Cameras in America, at which point the crew sought and failed to find a distributor.

== Release ==
The film premiered in Halifax, Nova Scotia at the 2009 Atlantic Film Festival (now known as the Atlantic International Film Festival).

Following this premier, the film fell into obscurity, soon becoming considered lost media. U.S. Election Special also fell into obscurity, with CTV losing the rights to publish or release it.

=== Rediscovery ===
Following Nathan Fielder growing in popularity with the release of Nathan for You and The Rehearsal, fan interests turned towards the film. Fans attempted to find the film, which included contacting anyone who had written about the film following its festival premier.

Beginning in February 2025, Tom Cardoso began searching for the film. In an article for The Globe and Mail, he outlined his years-long search for the film. He emailed potential rights holders in case they had copies they could release. He also posted on social media in order to drive interest. Furthermore, he repeatedly contacted Fielder. However, his PR team repeatedly chose to not comment on the film.

After reaching out to several companies which could be potential rights holders, Cardoso contacted Wildbrain, the successor to the company who originally produced the film, DHX Media. Wildbrain had a copy of the film in their archives; however, the film was not digitized, which made re-releasing it more difficult. Due to the cost associated with digitizing the footage, and the film falling outside of Wildbrain's typical area of focus in media, they declined to digitize it at the time.

Ashley Ratchford, who appeared in the film, had a DVD. However, she was unable to locate it after she had recently moved.

On November 18, 2026, Wildbrain announced that they had digitized the film and released the full documentary on YouTube for the first time. The link was quickly removed before being reshared the following day. A spokesman for Wildbrain later said that the company was looking into other means of distribution for the film. Following the film being taken down, it was also made available via unofficial means, including on the Internet Archive.

== Reception ==
Following the film's premier at the 2009 Atlantic Film Festival, it received the Rex Tasker Documentary Award.

Following the film's rediscovery, Nathan Fielder fans compared it favorably to Fielder's other works such as Nathan For You and The Rehearsal. Others drew parallels with Fielder's second film, You Can See Everything.
