= GiGi Erneta =

American actress

GiGi Erneta is an American actress, talk show host and writer known for her starring role in the film Flag of My Father, as Captain Judith Rainier.

== Biography ==
Erneta was born in New York City, to Argentinian parents. She studied in the Royal Academy of Dance, Playhouse West, and the Second City Los Angeles.

Erneta appeared in When The Bough Breaks, Happy Death Day and Happy Death Day 2U. She has had recurring roles on Veep, The First, Veronica Mars, Spanish soap operas and guest roles on Nashville, Jane the Virgin, American Crime, Scandal, NCIS: New Orleans, Friday Night Lights, and Strong Medicine. Erneta is a contributor to Fox News Latino.

== Filmography ==
=== Television ===
Year	Title	Role	Notes
1998	About Sarah	Paramedic	Television film
1998	Mysteries and Scandals	Mabel Normand	Episode: "William Desmond Taylor"
2002	Project Viper	Girl by the pool	Television film
2002	Nightstalker	Giselle LaVigne	Television film
2003	Hidden Hills	Margorie	Episode: "The Neighbors"
2004	Strong Medicine	Alison	Episode: "Omissions"
2005	La ley del silencio	Jane	Episode #1.1
2005, 2006	Veronica Mars	Mrs. Goodman	2 episodes
2006	Desire	Casey	2 episodes
2006	AlamoHeightsSA.com	Alexandra Mireles	Episode: "Part 8"
2006	Friday Night Lights	Mrs. Dunn	Episode: "It's Different for Girls"
2011	Camel Spiders	Reba	Television film
2012	Reel Dudes	Sophia	2 episodes
2013, 2014	Dallas	Dr. Bosnar / Nurse	2 episodes
2015	Scream Queens	Cable News Anchor	Episode: "The Final Girl(s)"
2016	American Crime	Shepherd	Episode: "Nine"
2016	Queen of the South	News Anchor	Episode: "Quinientos Mil"
2016	NCIS: New Orleans	Reporter #3	Episode: "Aftershocks"
2016	The Follower	News Reporter	Television film
2016	Duality	Allure	Episode: "The Choice"
2017	Too Close to Home	Interviewer	Episode: "Blurred Lines"
2017	Scandal	Elector from Iowa	Episode: "Trojan Horse"
2017	Jane the Virgin	Lawyer	Episode: "Chapter Sixty-Nine"
2018	Nashville	Attorney	Episode: "Two Sparrows in a Hurricane"
2018	The First	News Anchor	2 episodes
2019	Veep	JoJo Weaver	3 episodes
2019	The Purge	Fatima	4 episodes
2020	Sons of Thunder	Kelly Evert	Episode #1.3
2020, 2021	Roswell, New Mexico	Dr. Margot Meyerson	2 episodes
2021	Sacrifice	Erin Fleming	2 episodes
2021	Holiday in Santa Fe	Jennifer Sawyer	Television film
2022	George & Tammy	Nancy Sepulvado	Episode #1.6
2022	Love and Death	News Anchor Melinda	2 episodes
2023	The Curse	Martha	Episode: "Young Hearts"

=== Film ===
Year	Title	Role	Notes
1996	The Searcher	Marla	
1996	Secret Places	Model #5	
1997	Bitterland	Nurse	
1998	Visions	Nurse #2	
1998	Mistress of Seduction	Lady Cop	
1998	Love Without Frontier	Nurse	
1998	Intimate Nights	Cop #3	
2000	The Black Rose	Shannon	
2001	Firestorm Rising	Leah Andrews	
2001	Passion Crimes	Micelli	
2001	Raptor	Henderson	
2001	Reasonable Doubt	Morgan	
2001	The Price of the American Dream	Cristina	
2002	She's No Angel	Photographer	
2002	Burning Desires	Secretary	
2002	The Model Solution	Gale	
2002	Crossed	Lisa Travanti	
2002	Screaming Night	Officer Panameno	
2002	The Chatroom	Lula	
2003	Cheerleader Massacre	Deputy Adams	
2003	Lost Treasure	Girl on Phone	
2003	El Chupacabra	Mrs. Pinta	
2003	Bad Bizness	Hotel maid	
2004	Quiet Kill	Beautiful Girl	
2005	Hercules in Hollywood	Angel Delight	
2006	The Insatiable	Female Detective	
2008	The Name of God	Dr. Welch	
2008	The Fresh Air Will Do You Good	Officer Panameno	
2008	Risen	Jenny Mills	
2008	Dusk	Mother	
2009	Vampire in Vegas	Detective O'Hara	
2009	Hallettsville	Mrs. Jensen	
2009	Fire from Below	Toni Nelson	
2009	Secret at Arrow Lake	Sally	
2010	Endings	Niki Karlin	
2011	Flag of My Father	Captain Judith Rainier	
2012	You Became I: The War Within	Deb	
2012	Deadly Obsession	Danielle	
2015	Red All Over	Tangie Mateo	
2015	Adrenaline	Nurse Amy	
2015	Evan's Crime	Judge Hill	
2016	When the Bough Breaks	Dr. Grace Park	
2016	Temptation of the Miracle Weaver	Sr. Theresa Reynolds	
2016	Kopy Kings	Antoinette	
2017	Happy Death Day	Reporter	
2018	Our Father	Sister Theresa Reynolds	
2019	Happy Death Day 2U	Reporter	
2020	Body Cam	Newscaster	
2021	Mona Lisa and the Blood Moon	News Anchor #2	
2021	National Champions	Reporter	
2022	Tyson's Run	Local Sports Reporter	
