= Vancouver Talmud Torah =

Community day school

Location
- 998 West 26th Avenue; Vancouver, British Columbia, V5Z 2G1; Canada; 49.2479°N 123.1270°W

Information
- School type: Independent
- Founded: 1934
- Head of School: Emily Greenberg
- Grades: Preschool (Rishonim) to Grade 7
- Enrollment: 500+
- Language: English, Hebrew
- Website: www.talmudtorah.com

Vancouver Talmud Torah (VTT) is a Jewish community day school located in Vancouver, British Columbia, Canada serving students from preschool to grade 7. While originating in the local Talmudei Torah, the school provides services to the entire Jewish community.

The largest Canadian Jewish day school west of Ontario, Vancouver Talmud Torah (VTT) traces its roots to 1913, when the first afternoon/evening classes were held on Heatley Street, in what is now the neighbourhood of Strathcona. In 1918, the school was founded as The Vancouver Hebrew School under the leadership of president Max Grossman. It became the official ‘afternoon school’ of the nearby synagogue, Schara Tzedeck, in 1921. In 1934, VTT incorporated as an independent school, and in 1943, the school expanded to a full-day school, moving to an 11-room house on W 14th Avenue.

In 1948, VTT built the original wing of its present location on Oak Street. At that time, the founders created bylaws designating VTT as a community school, accepting all students regardless of their ability to pay tuition. VTT has stayed true to that ideal, and has expanded to a school of 500+ students. A dual-curriculum school offering Judaic and general studies, all students are taught the traditional Jewish values of Derech Eretz (care and respect), Tikkun Olam (world repair through good deeds), and Ahavat Yisrael (love of Israel).

In 2017, VTT built a large expansion to the school, featuring a double gym and the largest rooftop field in Vancouver.

Since 1948, VTT has graduated more than 2,000 students.

VTT is supported by tuition, the VTT Foundation, the Jewish Federation of Greater Vancouver, private donors, and alumni.

== Notable alumni ==
- Seth Rogen, comedian
- Nathan Fielder, comedian, writer, and pilot
