= Carrie Kemper =

American television writer

- Born: March 16, 1984 (age 42); Kansas City, Missouri, U.S.
- Education: Stanford University (BA)
- Occupation: Television writer
- Years active: 2007–present
- Relatives: Ellie Kemper (sister); William Thornton Kemper Sr. (great-great-grandfather)

Carrie Kemper (born March 16, 1984) is an American television writer who has written for The Office, Silicon Valley, Nathan For You, Baskets, Beef, The Curse, and The Rehearsal. She is the younger sister of actress Ellie Kemper.

== Career ==
Kemper worked as a staff writer on The Office from the beginning of the show's seventh season. She wrote the episodes "Ultimatum" (season 7, episode 13); "Spooked" (season 8, episode 5); "The Whale", in which she appeared as Jan Levinson's assistant Molly (season 9, episode 7); and "Junior Salesman" (season 9, episode 13). In 2010, Kemper and 21 other writers shared a Writers Guild of America award nomination for their work on The Office.

In 2013, she had a brief appearance in the Arrested Development episode "Smashed" as Mrs. Astronaut Lovel.

In 2014, she joined Silicon Valley as a writer and producer. She worked on the show for five seasons and was nominated along with the rest of the producers for "Best Comedy" three times. She played "Female VC" in the episode "Daily Active Users (season 3, episode 9).

In 2015 and 2016, she wrote for Nathan for You and won a Writers Guild of America Awards in 2019.

In 2021, she worked as a writer on The Rehearsal as well as on The Curse. She won an Independent Spirit Award for her work on The Rehearsal, and was nominated for a Writers Guild of America award for The Curse.

In 2023, she won an Emmy Award for her work on Beef.

In 2025, she was nominated for an Emmy Award for best comedy writing for her work on the second season of The Rehearsal.
