= Benny Safdie =

American filmmaker and actor (born 1986)

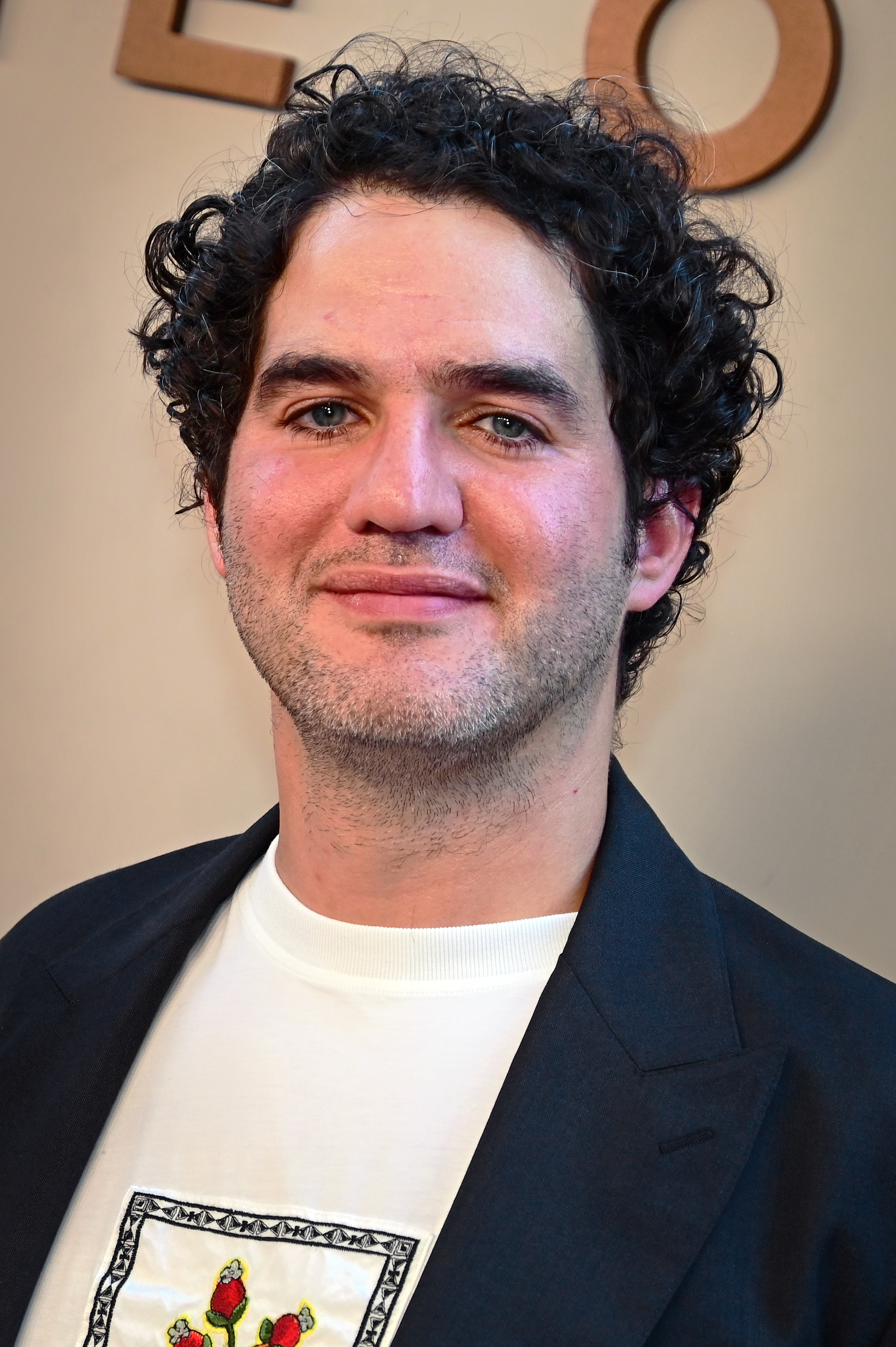
- Safdie in 2026
- Born: Benjamin Safdie; February 24, 1986 (age 40); New York City, U.S.
- Education: Boston University (BS)
- Occupations: Film director; producer; screenwriter; film editor; actor
- Years active: 2007–present
- Spouse: Ava Rawski (m. 2013)
- Children: 2
- Relatives: Josh Safdie (brother); Moshe Safdie (great-uncle); Oren Safdie (first cousin once removed); Dov Charney (first cousin once removed)

Benjamin Safdie (born February 24, 1986) is an American filmmaker and actor, most known for his film collaborations with his elder brother, Josh, in Heaven Knows What (2014), Good Time (2017), which he also starred in, and Uncut Gems (2019).

Safdie's career additionally includes co-creating, writing, and acting in the satirical series The Curse (2023) with comedian Nathan Fielder, and his solo directorial debut The Smashing Machine (2025), for which he won the Silver Lion at the 82nd Venice International Film Festival.

For his role in Good Time as Nick, Safdie was nominated for the Independent Spirit Award for Best Supporting Male, and has since starred in Licorice Pizza (2021), Are You There God? It's Me, Margaret. (2023), Oppenheimer (2023) and Happy Gilmore 2 (2025). In 2026, he voiced Bowser Jr. in The Super Mario Galaxy Movie and portrayed Agamemnon in Christopher Nolan's The Odyssey.

== Early life ==
Safdie's parents are Amy and Alberto Safdie. He is of Syrian-Jewish descent on his father's side, and Russian-Jewish descent on his mother's side. He was raised in New York City. When their parents divorced, he and elder brother Josh divided their time between their father in Queens and their mother and stepfather in Manhattan. He attended Columbia Grammar & Preparatory School and graduated from the Boston University College of Communication in 2008.

== Career ==
=== Filmmaking ===
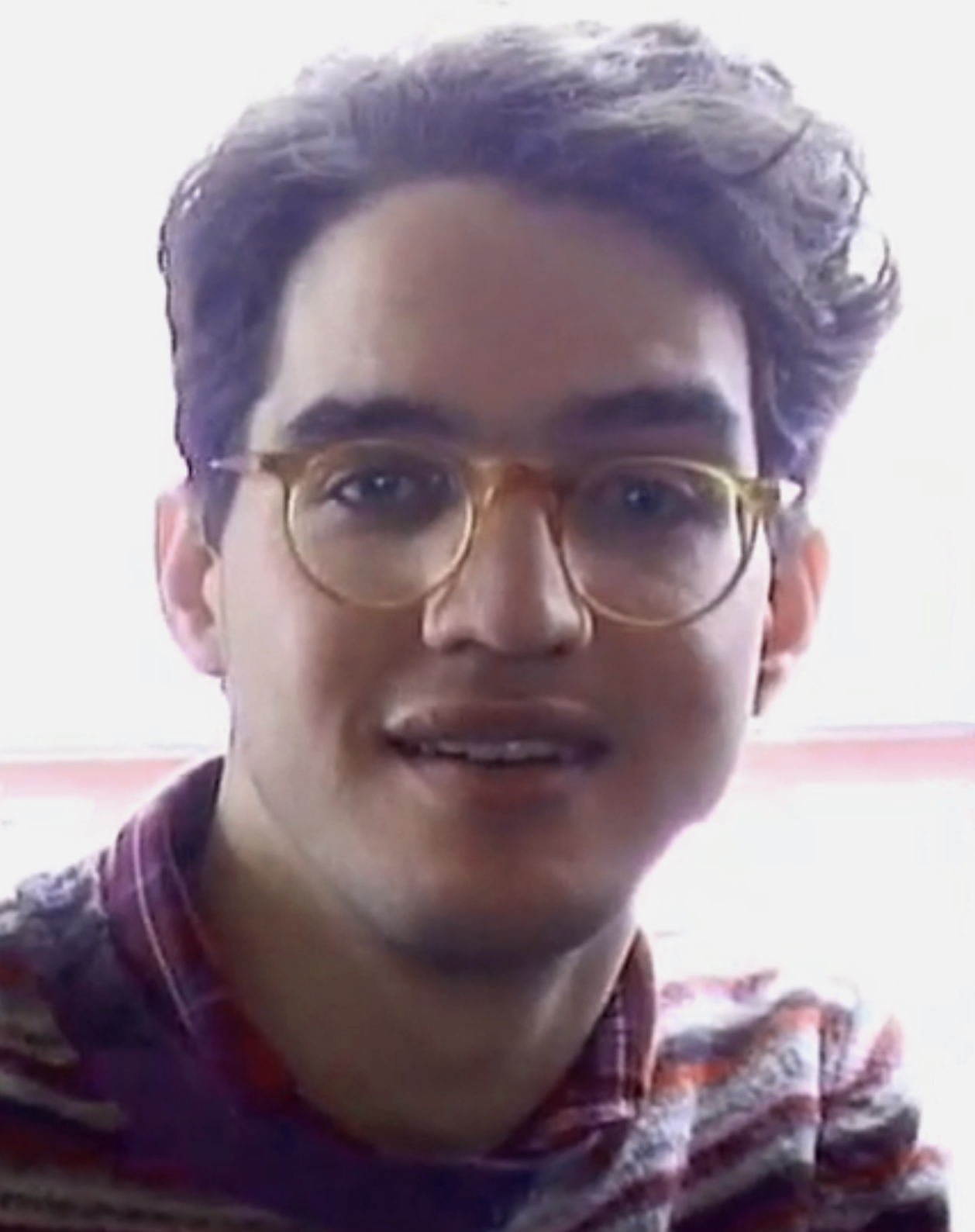
Safdie in 2010

The Safdies' first feature was the 2009 film Daddy Longlegs: they also wrote the screenplay and edited the film together. The film was showcased in the Directors' Fortnight at the 2009 Cannes Film Festival. In 2013, they debuted the documentary film Lenny Cooke at the Tribeca Film Festival, a documentary they became attached to after Cooke approached them to review the footage. In 2014, the pair premiered their next film Heaven Knows What at the 71st Venice International Film Festival. In February 2016, the brothers began filming their crime thriller film Good Time, which Benny starred in alongside Robert Pattinson, in New York City. It premiered at the 2017 Cannes Film Festival, where it competed for the Palme d'Or. Benny, for his performance, was nominated for the Independent Spirit Award for Best Supporting Male.

Uncut Gems, Josh and Benny's next film, starred Adam Sandler, LaKeith Stanfield and Julia Fox; Martin Scorsese was executive producer. The brothers won the Independent Spirit Award for Best Director, and Benny shared the Independent Spirit Award for Best Editing with Ronald Bronstein, with whom he has co-edited all the Safdie brother films.

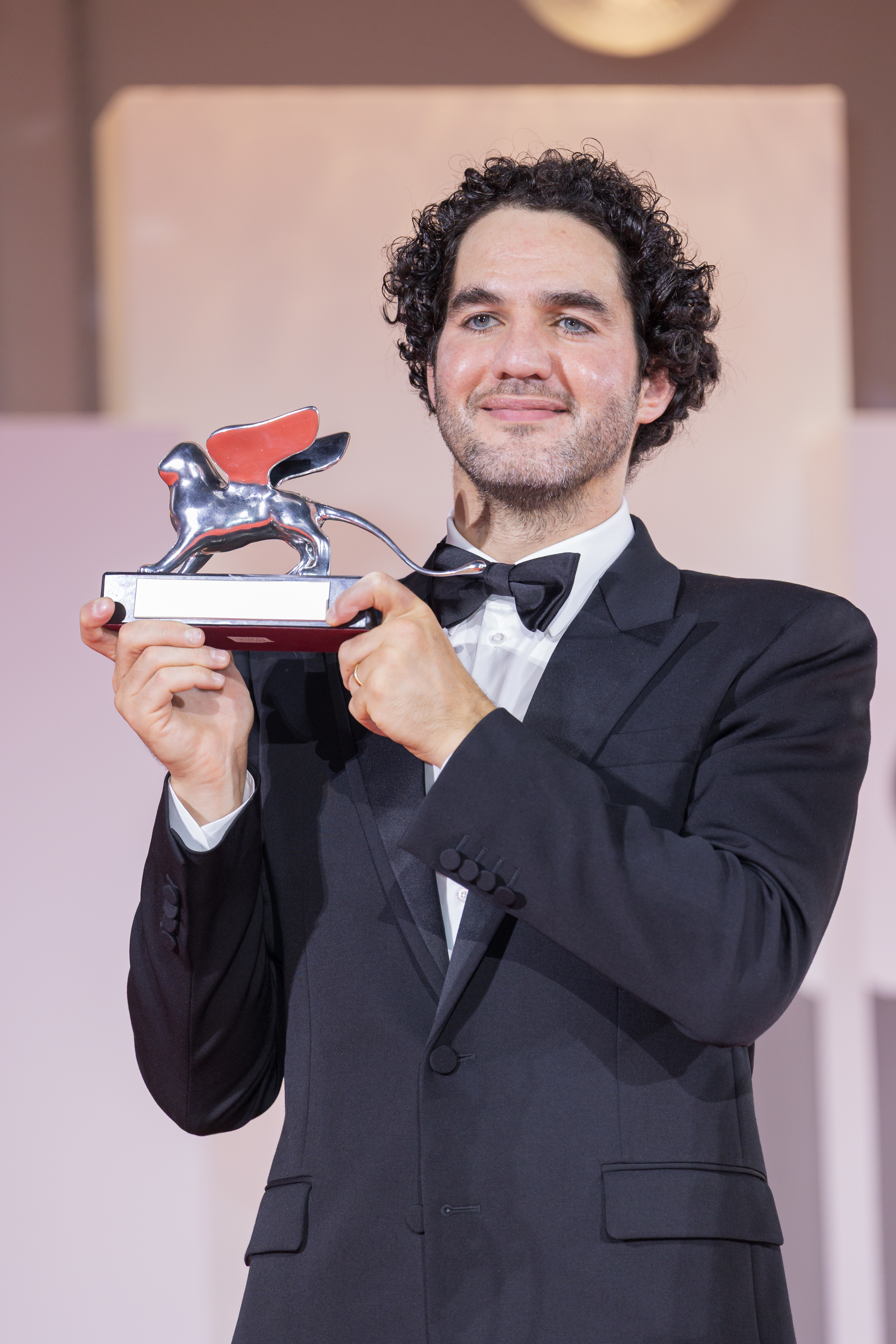
Safdie holding his Silver Lion at the 82nd Venice International Film Festival

Safdie and Nathan Fielder co-created the Showtime series The Curse, which premiered in November 2023. The show, in which they also starred, received critical acclaim, and Safdie earned an Independent Spirit Award nomination for Best Supporting Performance in a New Scripted Series.

Safdie then, in his first directorial endeavour without his brother and his first solo writing credit, directed the MMA themed film The Smashing Machine, starring Dwayne Johnson as former wrestler and MMA fighter Mark Kerr. The film premiered at the 82nd Venice International Film Festival, where Safdie won the Silver Lion for Best Direction. The film received a theatrical release in October 2025 by A24.

=== Acting ===
In 2017, Safdie began taking on performances not directed by himself or Josh, appearing in a role in the film Person to Person. In 2020, he appeared in Pieces of a Woman, and in 2021 he took on a significant supporting role in the Paul Thomas Anderson film Licorice Pizza.

In 2022, Safdie appeared in Claire Denis' romantic thriller Stars at Noon, and as Nari in the Disney+ miniseries Obi-Wan Kenobi. In 2023, he starred in the film adaptation Are You There God? It's Me, Margaret., and appears as Edward Teller in Oppenheimer, directed by Christopher Nolan.

In 2025, he appeared in Happy Gilmore 2, and reunited with Nolan to play King Agamemnon in The Odyssey in 2026. He played the voice of Bowser Jr. in The Super Mario Galaxy Movie.

== Personal life ==
Safdie is Jewish. His father was born in Italy and raised in France, and is of Sephardic-Jewish and Syrian-Jewish descent. His mother is of Russian-Jewish descent. His great uncle is architect Moshe Safdie. His cousins once removed are playwright Oren Safdie and entrepreneur Dov Charney.

He is married to Ava Safdie (née Rawski), with whom he has two sons.

== Filmography ==
=== Films ===
Key
†	Denotes films that have not yet been released

Year	Title	Director	Writer	Editor	Producer	Collaboration with Josh	Notes
2008	The Pleasure of Being Robbed	No	No	Yes	No	Yes	
2009	Daddy Longlegs	Yes	Yes	Yes	No	Yes	
2013	Lenny Cooke	Yes	No	Yes	No	Yes	
2014	Heaven Knows What	Yes	No	Yes	No	Yes	
2017	Good Time	Yes	No	Yes	No	Yes	
2019	Uncut Gems	Yes	Yes	Yes	No	Yes	
2022	Funny Pages	No	No	No	Yes	Yes	
2025	The Smashing Machine	Yes	Yes	Yes	Yes	No	
2026	Public Access	No	No	No	Yes	No	
2026	Cameron Winter at Carnegie Hall †	No	No	No	Yes	No	
2027	Lizard Music †	Yes	Yes	TBA	Yes	No	

=== Film ===
Year	Title	Role	Director	Notes	Ref.
2017	Person to Person	Eugene	Dustin Guy Defa		
2017	Good Time	Nick Nikas	Safdie brothers		
2020	Pieces of a Woman	Chris	Kornél Mundruczó		
2021	Licorice Pizza	Joel Wachs	Paul Thomas Anderson		
2022	Stars at Noon	CIA Man	Claire Denis		
2023	Are You There God? It's Me, Margaret.	Herb Simon	Kelly Fremon Craig		
2023	Oppenheimer	Edward Teller	Christopher Nolan		
2025	Happy Gilmore 2	Frank Manatee	Kyle Newacheck		
2026	The Super Mario Galaxy Movie	Bowser Jr.	Aaron Horvath and Michael Jelenic	Voice	
2026	The Odyssey	Agamemnon	Christopher Nolan		

=== Television ===
Year	Title	Role	Notes	Ref.
2016	Togetherness	Craddock Brother #2	Episode: "Advanced Pretend"	
2022	Obi-Wan Kenobi	Nari	Episode: "Part I"	
2023–2024	The Curse	Dougie Schecter	Main role, also co-creator, writer, executive producer and editor	

== Awards and nominations ==
=== Safdie brothers ===
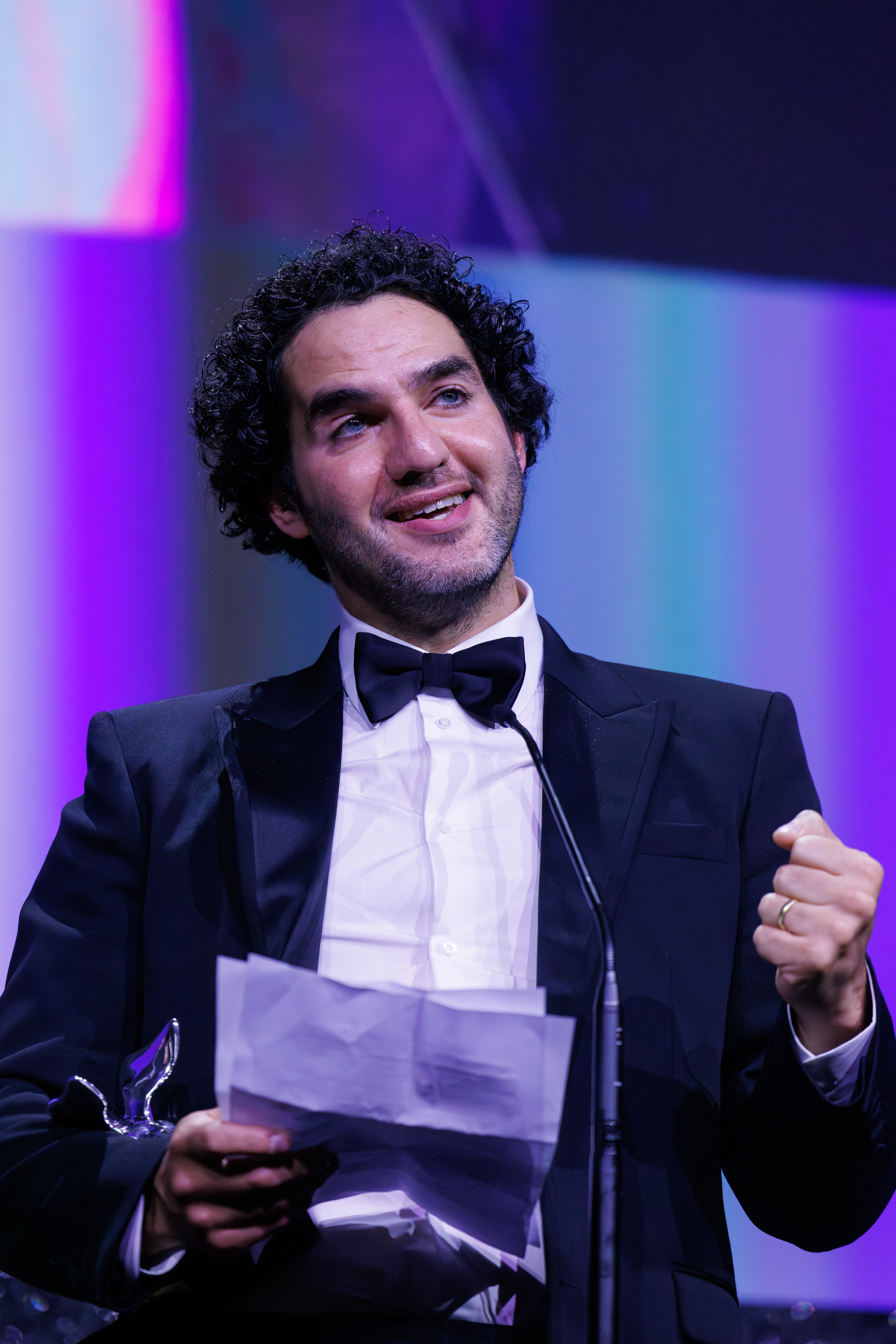
Safdie the 2025 Venice Film Festival

=== Solo ===
Award	Date of ceremony	Category	Recipient(s)	Result	Ref.
Venice International Film Festival	September 6, 2025	Golden Lion	Benny Safdie	Nominated	
Venice International Film Festival	September 6, 2025	Silver Lion	Benny Safdie	Won	
Stockholm International Film Festival	November 16, 2025	Stockholm Visionary Award	Benny Safdie	Honored	
