= Nathan Fielder =

Canadian filmmaker (born 1983)

- Fielder in 2017
- Born: Nathan Joseph Fielder; May 12, 1983 (age 43); Vancouver, British Columbia, Canada
- Education: University of Victoria (BCom)
- Spouse: Sarah Ziolkowska (m. 2011; div. 2014)

Comedy career
- Years active: 2006–present
- Medium: Stand-up; television; film
- Genres: Alternative comedy; improvisational comedy; anti-humor; deadpan; cringe comedy; satire
- Subjects: American culture; Canadian culture; pop culture; Jewish culture; social awkwardness; reality television; human behaviour

Nathan Joseph Fielder (born May 12, 1983) is a Canadian filmmaker, actor, pilot, and comedian. He is known for his awkward, deadpan persona and his use of satire and surreal humor.

Born and raised in Vancouver, Fielder was involved in his school's improv group as a teenager, which featured fellow comedian Seth Rogen. He majored in business at the University of Victoria, which influenced his later work. After attending a comedy course at Humber College in Toronto, Fielder began his career as a correspondent for CBC's This Hour Has 22 Minutes, which featured his own segment series "Nathan on Your Side" from 2008 to 2009. He wrote and appeared on the American sketch show Important Things with Demetri Martin (2011).

Fielder co-created, directed, and starred in the Comedy Central parody reality show Nathan for You (2013–2017), in which he portrays a slightly more awkward version of himself, who offers advice to struggling businesses. After the show's conclusion, he executive produced the HBO docu-series How To with John Wilson (2020–2023), before creating, writing, directing, and starring in the HBO docu-comedy The Rehearsal (2022–present). He collaborated with filmmaker and actor Benny Safdie to create his first scripted series, Showtime's The Curse (2023–2024), in which he starred, alongside Safdie and Emma Stone. Fielder then co-directed with Lance Oppenheim, the critically acclaimed documentary film You Can See Everything (2026), which follows the disgraced entrepreneur Elizabeth Holmes and her partner Billy Evans.

His accolades include a Peabody Award, an Independent Spirit Award, and a WGA Award, as well as four nominations for a Primetime Emmy Award. In 2023, he was featured on Time's list of the 100 most influential people in the world.

== Early life and education ==
Nathan Joseph Fielder was born on May 12, 1983, in Vancouver, British Columbia. His family is Jewish. His parents, Deb and Eric Fielder, are both social workers, and he has a younger sister named Becca. He attended Vancouver Talmud Torah and Point Grey Secondary School in Vancouver. He was a member of the latter's improv comedy group, which included comedian Seth Rogen. He was also passionate about stage magic as a teenager, and worked at a magic shop in a shopping mall.

Fielder initially studied science at the University of British Columbia with the goal of "[making] a lot of money" as a dentist, but grew dissatisfied with his coursework and transferred to the University of Victoria, where he studied entrepreneurship and marketing and graduated with a Bachelor of Commerce degree in 2005. After university, he briefly worked for a brokerage firm in British Columbia, which he found "depressing" and overly concerned with money. Feeling unable to pursue a career he did not like, he quit the job in 2005 and moved to Toronto to see if he could succeed as a comedian, giving himself a year to do so. He joined Laugh Sabbath, a local comedy collective, and enrolled in Humber College's Comedy Program in 2006. During this time, he made "hundreds" of short films, which he presented at Laugh Sabbath's weekly shows.

== Career ==
=== 2006–2012: Early work ===
Fielder received the Tim Sims Encouragement Fund Award in 2006, and took a job as an interviewer for Canadian Idol. Fielder's short films—mainly comprising short sketches involving him and his friends—were noticed on YouTube by Michael Donovan, an executive producer for the CBC comedy series This Hour Has 22 Minutes. Donovan hired Fielder as a field correspondent and developed his popular recurring segment, "Nathan on Your Side". In 2008, Fielder made his directorial debut with Love and Cameras in America, a documentary about the 2008 United States presidential election. In 2010, Fielder wrote and directed a number of sketches for Season 2 of Important Things with Demetri Martin on Comedy Central. He was also featured as a guest voice actor on the Season 2 finale of Bob's Burgers, "Beefsquatch", as well as the Season 6 episode, "The Land Ship". He played Jon Benjamin's boom operator in the 2011 television series Jon Benjamin Has a Van, and Bob Woodward in the "Washington, D.C." episode of Comedy Central's Drunk History.

=== 2013–2017: Nathan for You ===
In 2013, Fielder co-created his own show on Comedy Central, Nathan for You. He wrote, directed, and starred in the show, which is based on the "Nathan on Your Side" segments he did for This Hour Has 22 Minutes. The show's premise features Fielder, playing a persona loosely based on himself, providing advice for local small businesses. The show finished its fourth and last season in November 2017.

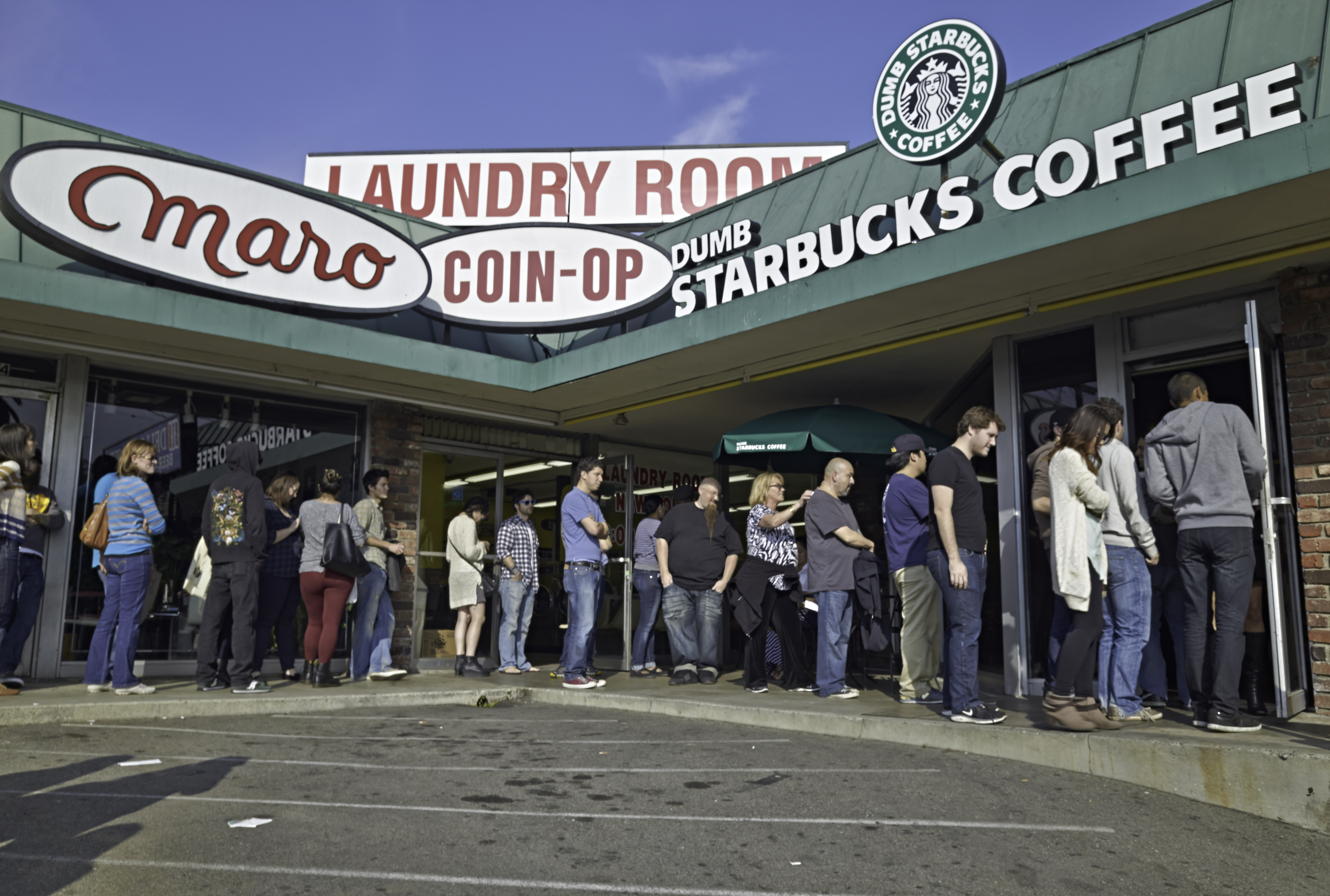
The Dumb Starbucks in Los Feliz, California

On the morning of February 7, 2014, a coffee shop called Dumb Starbucks Coffee opened in the Los Feliz neighborhood of Los Angeles. The shop said it was operating as a parody of the coffee chain Starbucks and used Starbucks's siren logo in its signage, cups, and other materials. In the episode, Fielder says his understanding of parody law is "based off what I read on Wikipedia". The shop sold items standard to Starbucks locations, such as Norah Jones CDs and drinks, by using the term "Dumb" in the names, such as "Dumb Norah Jones Duets" and "Dumb Iced Vanilla Latte". Beverages and pastries were distributed free of charge. A few days later, Starbucks announced that it was not affiliated and that it was "evaluating [its] next steps".

The identity of the person behind the shop was not released initially, and various artists and comedians including Banksy and Tim & Eric were theorized to be involved with the prank. (The latter's production company Abso Lutely Productions had applied for a filming permit at the Dumb Starbucks Coffee location.) On February 10, 2014, the shop was closed by the Los Angeles County Department of Public Health for not having the permits required to operate a coffee shop. Shortly thereafter, Fielder announced he was behind the parody and the Los Angeles Times noted the prank's similarity to other skits performed on his show Nathan for You.

In 2015, Fielder guest-starred on the Adult Swim show Rick and Morty and appeared in the film The Night Before. In 2017 he co-starred in the biopic The Disaster Artist.

=== 2018–present: Career expansion ===
Fielder worked as a consulting producer, writer, and co-director of the Sacha Baron Cohen-created political mockumentary series Who is America? (2018). In 2019, it was announced that Fielder had signed an overall deal with HBO under which he would serve as executive producer for the John Wilson-created documentary series How To with John Wilson and star in, write, and direct a separate comedy series. In 2021, HBO announced the name of another new comedy series, The Rehearsal, starring Fielder, who also served as writer, executive producer, and director. The first season of The Rehearsal was released in 2022 to a generally positive reception and it was renewed by HBO for a second season. For the series, Fielder won the Independent Spirit Award for Best New Non-Scripted or Documentary Series.

In Season 2 of The Rehearsal, Fielder satirized use of roleplay to train pilots on communication before and during flight. In response to the FAA's denial of the show's central claim that pilot communication is to blame for airline disasters, Fielder criticized them on CNN and said, "That's dumb. They're dumb." Fielder promoted the episode on aviation, during guest appearances on Jimmy Kimmel Live!, and CNN. Fielder employed John Goglia, an American aviation safety consultant and former member of the National Transportation Safety Board (NTSB), in a role as his advisor on The Rehearsal. Goglia accompanied Fielder on public interviews related to promoting Fielder's television show.

In 2022, Showtime picked up the comedy series The Curse, created and written by Fielder and filmmaker Benny Safdie, and starring Fielder, Safdie, and Emma Stone. The first three episodes premiered at the 2023 New York Film Festival in Manhattan. The rest of the episodes aired on Paramount+ and were shown at Lincoln Center. Stone added Fielder to Time's "100 Most Influential People in 2023", calling his ability to "move fluidly between directing, writing, acting, and producing, all while editing The Rehearsal" a "staggering feat". In 2025, Season 2 of The Rehearsal aired on HBO, and received generally positive reviews. The show's central idea of rehearsing and performing social interactions resonated with many autistic viewers, who viewed it as an analogy for autistic masking. After the overarching subject matter of aircraft pilots on The Rehearsal, Fielder became an FAA-certified Boeing 737 commercial pilot in February 2025. As part of his comedy bit for The Rehearsal, he worked briefly in 2025 as a ferry pilot for Nomadic Aviation Group.

On September 6, 2026, Fielder and Lance Oppenheim's A24 documentary You Can See Everything premiered in a surprise screening at the Telluride Film Festival in Telluride, Colorado. The film, which depicts Theranos founder Elizabeth Holmes in the weeks before she began serving her 11-year prison sentence for defrauding investors, was released on October 16, 2026.

== Influences ==
Some of the comedians Fielder has named as influences include Chris Morris and Stephen Colbert.

== Personal life ==
Fielder married children's librarian Sarah Ziolkowska in 2011, and they divorced in 2014. He has resided in Silver Lake, Los Angeles, as of 2022.

== Activism ==
=== Holocaust awareness ===
As a student, Fielder attended a speech hosted by the Vancouver Holocaust Education Centre (VHEC) featuring a Holocaust survivor. The experience led to his longstanding relationship with the VHEC.

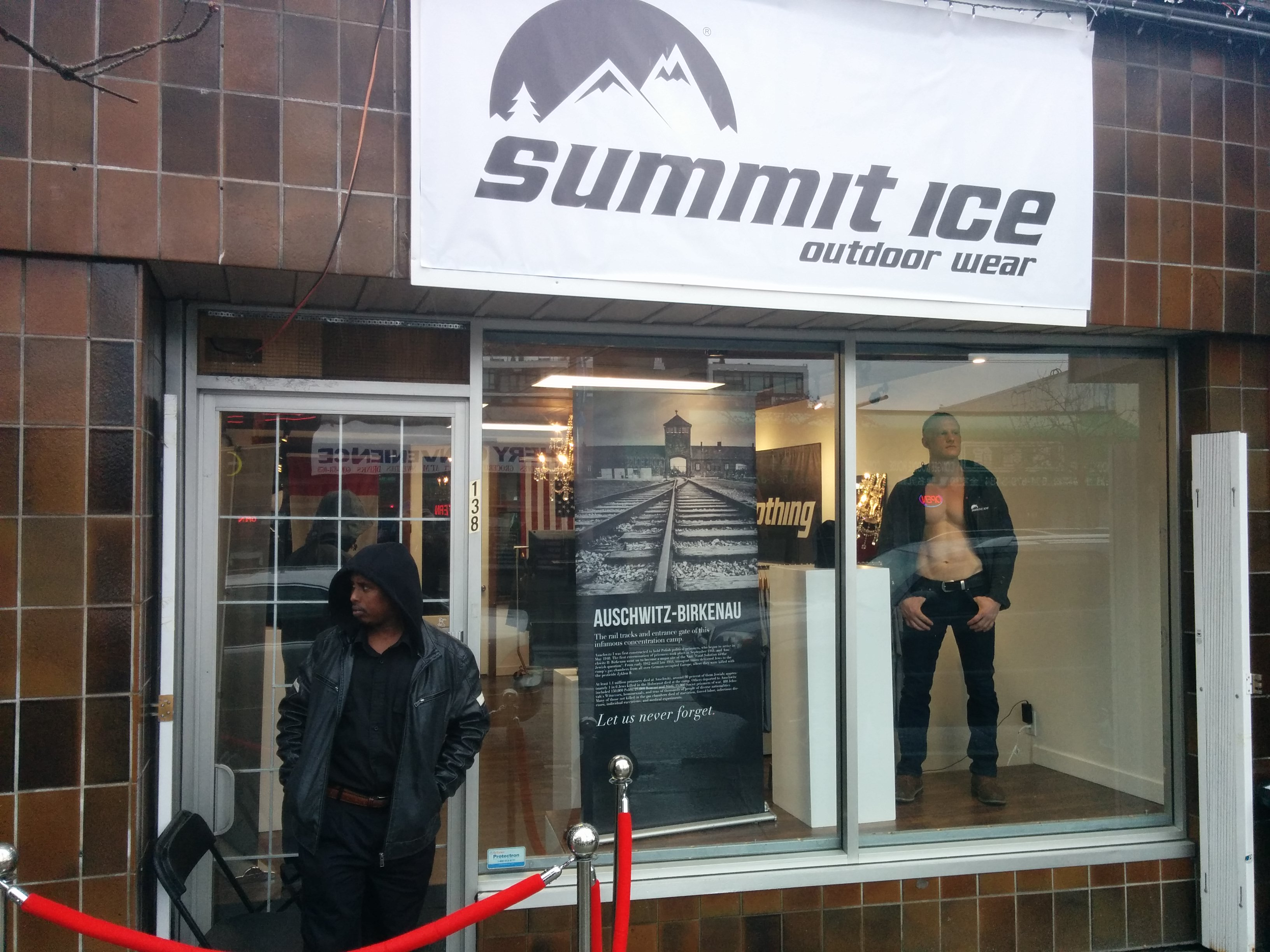
Summit Ice pop-up store in Vancouver, British Columbia, in 2017

In 2015, Fielder founded the not-for-profit company Summit Ice Apparel. It produces softshell jackets and raises awareness of the Holocaust. It had close to $500,000 in sales in the first three months, with all profits going to VHEC. As of 2025, Summit Ice Apparel said it had earned millions in support of youth education surrounding "intolerance, racial bias, and genocide".

Fielder was inspired to start Summit Ice Apparel after learning that Taiga in Vancouver, an organization he previously supported, published a tribute to the Holocaust denier Doug Collins. In 2017, Fielder hosted a one-day pop-up shop in Vancouver where customers could trade in their Taiga clothing for Summit Ice Apparel products.

The second episode of Nathan for You's third season, which featured Summit Ice Apparel, was removed by Paramount+ worldwide as the German division of Paramount expressed concerns of antisemitism in the wake of the Gaza war. In the second episode of The Rehearsal's second season, Fielder expressed his disappointment with the removal, calling Summit Ice Apparel his "proudest achievement".

== Filmography ==
=== Film ===
Year	Title	Role	Notes
2006	Morris	—N/a	Short film Writer and director
2008	Love and Cameras in America	Himself	Feature directorial debut Also director, editor, and co-writer
2010	Kelly 5-9	Director	Short film
2011	Way Up There	—N/a	Short film Writer and co-director
2012	Buyer's Market	—N/a	Short film Director
2013	The Web	Manager	Short film Also writer, director, and producer
2015	The Night Before	Joshua	
2017	The Disaster Artist	Kyle Vogt	
2021	Marcel the Shell with Shoes On	Justin (voice)	
2026	The History of Concrete	Himself	
2026	You Can See Everything	Himself	Co-directed with Lance Oppenheim and also producer

=== Television ===
Year	Title	Role	Notes
2007	Canadian Idol	—N/a	Segment producer and writer
2008–2009	This Hour Has 22 Minutes	Nathan	9 episodes
2010	Important Things with Demetri Martin	Various Characters	Also segment director
2011	Jon Benjamin Has a Van	Nathan	10 episodes Also creative consultant
2011	Nick Swardson's Pretend Time	Dan Hyannis	Episode: "Legalize Meth"
2012–2015	Bob's Burgers	Jordan (voice) / Nathan (voice)	2 episodes
2013–2014	Drunk History	Bob Woodward	2 episodes
2013–2015	Kroll Show	Tommy Rothchild / Douglas Dubois / Gil	3 episodes
2013–2017	Nathan for You	Nathan Fielder	32 episodes Also creator, writer, director, and executive producer
2014	The League	Evan	Episode: "When Rafi Met Randy"
2015	The Simpsons	Doug Blattner (voice)	Episode: "Sky Police"
2015	Childrens Hospital	Matthew Hauser	Episode: "Sperm Bank Heist"
2015	Rick and Morty	Kyle (voice)	Episode: "The Ricks Must Be Crazy"
2015	The Grinder	Officer Collins	Episode: "Buckingham Malice"
2016	Animals.	DJ Lab Rat (voice)	Episode: "Rats"
2016	Comedy Bang! Bang!	Himself	Episode: "Nathan Fielder Wears a Blue and Grey Flannel and Jeans"
2016	Transparent	Seth	Episode: "When the Battle Is Over"
2016	David: Story of David	David	Web series
2017	Tour de Pharmacy	Stu Ruckman	Television film
2018	Who Is America?	—N/a	Consulting producer Writer and co-director (episode 2); Co-director (episode 4)
2020–2023	How To with John Wilson	—N/a	Executive producer
2021	Saturday Morning All Star Hits!	Corbee	Episode: "Tape 8: LIVE!"
2022–present	The Rehearsal	Nathan Fielder	Also creator, executive producer, writer, director
2023–2024	The Curse	Asher	Main role; also co-creator, writer and director

== Awards and nominations ==
Organizations	Year	Category	Work	Result	Ref.
Atlantic Film Festival	2009	Rex Tasker Documentary Award	Love and Cameras in America	Won	
Cinema Eye Honors	2022	Outstanding Anthology Series	How To with John Wilson	Nominated	
Cinema Eye Honors	2023	Heterodox Award	The Rehearsal (Season 1)	Nominated	
Cinema Eye Honors	2023	Outstanding Anthology Series	How To with John Wilson	Won	
Cinema Eye Honors	2026	Heterodox Award	The Rehearsal (Season 2)	Nominated	
Cinema Eye Honors	2026	Outstanding Anthology Series	How To with John Wilson (Season 3)	Won	
Critics Choice Documentary Awards	2026	Best Director	You Can See Everything	Won	
Critics Choice Documentary Awards	2026	Best Documentary Feature	You Can See Everything	Won	
Directors Guild of America Awards	2018	Outstanding Directing - Variety Series	Who is America?	Nominated	
Gotham Awards	2021	Breakthrough Nonfiction Series	How To with John Wilson	Nominated	
Gotham Awards	2022	Breakthrough Nonfiction Series	The Rehearsal	Nominated	
Gotham Awards	2026	Best Documentary Feature	You Can See Everything	Pending	
Gotham Awards	2026	Audience Award	You Can See Everything	Pending	
Independent Spirit Awards	2022	Best New Non-Scripted or Documentary Series	The Rehearsal	Won	
Primetime Emmy Awards	2019	Outstanding Directing for a Variety Series	Who is America? (Episode: "102")	Nominated	
Primetime Emmy Awards	2024	Outstanding Hosted Nonfiction Series or Special	How To with John Wilson	Nominated	
Primetime Emmy Awards	2025	Outstanding Directing for a Comedy Series	The Rehearsal (Episode: "Pilot's Code")	Nominated	
Primetime Emmy Awards	2025	Outstanding Writing for a Comedy Series	The Rehearsal (Episode: "Pilot's Code")	Nominated	
Writers Guild of America Awards	2016	Comedy / Variety Series	Nathan for You	Nominated	
Writers Guild of America Awards	2017	Comedy / Variety Tributes	Nathan for You: A Celebration	Nominated	
Writers Guild of America Awards	2017	Comedy / Variety Series	Nathan for You	Nominated	
Writers Guild of America Awards	2018	Comedy / Variety Series	Nathan for You	Won	
Writers Guild of America Awards	2023	Drama Series	The Curse	Nominated	
