= List of On Cinema episodes =

On Cinema (also On Cinema at the Cinema for the video series) is a comedic film review web series starring Tim Heidecker and perpetual guest host Gregg Turkington as a pair of hapless movie reviewers (using their own names).

The show aired as a podcast from 2011 to 2013, before being picked up as a professionally produced web video series by Thing X in 2012–13 for its first two seasons, and adultswim.com starting in its third season in 2013.

On Cinema remained an Adult Swim production until April 2021, as the show moved to HEI Network, an independent subscription service, and became community-funded. As of 2026 there are 16 seasons, 12 of which can be watched for free, including a special titled "The Trial."

A live Oscar special is also conducted every year, previously streamed via YouTube though recent specials are now exclusive to HEI Network.

On Cinema also has a spin-off series titled Decker, which as of 2018 has aired six seasons combined, with three on the web and three on television, via Adult Swim.com and Adult Swim respectively.

== Episodes overview ==
Season	Episodes	Originally released	
Season	Episodes	First released	Last released
Podcast	47 (& 14 specials)	September 20, 2011	April 22, 2013
1	10 (& 1 special)	December 2, 2012	January 17, 2013
2	10 (& 4 specials)	February 7, 2013	April 25, 2013
3	10 (& 1 special)	July 7, 2013	December 18, 2013
4	10 (& 1 special)	January 8, 2014	March 12, 2014
5	10	July 2, 2014	September 3, 2014
6	10 (& 1 special)	February 4, 2015	April 8, 2015
7	10 (& 1 special)	September 9, 2015	November 11, 2015
8	10 (& 1 special)	March 2, 2016	November 11, 2016
9	10 (& 1 special)	February 26, 2017	May 15, 2017
The Trial	6	November 15, 2017	November 28, 2017
10	10 (& 2 specials)	January 16, 2018	May 25, 2018
11	10 (& 2 specials)	January 25, 2019	November 27, 2019
12	10 (& 5 specials)	December 19, 2019	February 14, 2022
13	10 (& 3 specials)	March 22, 2022	January 4, 2023
14	10 (& 2 specials)	March 12, 2023	March 10, 2024
15	10 (& 2 specials)	December 25, 2024	June 18, 2025
16	9 (& 2 specials)	October 1, 2025	March 15, 2026

== Episodes ==
=== Podcast ===
Note: There was no rating system for the podcast episodes, as that was developed for the video series.

Episode	Air Date	Title	Summary
101	September 20, 2011	Ghostbusters	Tim and Gregg discuss the 20th Anniversary of Ghostbusters starring Bill Murray Dan Aykroyd and Harold Ramis. Directed by Ivan Reitman.
102	October 11, 2011	The Shining	Tim is joined by his guest @greggturkington to discuss The Shining.
103	October 18, 2011	Run Lola Run (Live from Octoberfest)	Tim is LIVE FROM OCTOBERFEST to discuss German Cinema and the Film Run Lola Run with his guest Gregg Turkington.
104	October 24, 2011	Carlito's Way	Tim is joined by guest Gregg Turktington (Note: intentional misspelling) to discuss Carlito's Way starring Al Pacino and Sean Penn.
105	November 1, 2011	The China Syndrome	Tim and Gregg discuss The China Syndrome not starring Mel Gibson and Danny Glover.
106	November 8, 2011	Lethal Weapon Trilogy	Tim and Gregg discuss Lethal Weapon starring Mel Gibson and Danny Glover.
Special	November 10, 2011	New Movie Bonus Episode!: J. Edgar	Tim and Gregg dicusss [sic] A NEW MOVIE in theaters: J. Edgar about Hoover from FBI.
107	November 16, 2011	The Graduate	Tim and Gregg discuss the film from the Sixties called The Graduate.
108	November 21, 2011	Star Trek II: The Wrath of Khan	Tim and Gregg discuss Star Trek II.
109	November 28, 2011	Jewel of the Nile	Tim and Gregg discuss Jewel of the Nile.
Special	December 1, 2011	On Cinema Commercial	Our First Commercial For On Cinema Podcast. Written and directed by Tim Heidecker.
110	December 6, 2011	Escape from Alcatraz (Live from San Francisco)	Tim and Gregg discuss Escape from Alcatraz (live, from San Francisco).
Special	December 13, 2011	Holiday Movie Special	‘Tis the Season! Tim and his special guest Gregg Turkington discuss their favorite Holiday Films. (Miracle on 34th Street and It's a Wonderful Life)
111	December 20, 2011	Tinker Tailor Soldier Spy	Tim and Gregg discuss Tinker Tailor Soldier Spy.
112	December 27, 2011	Carlito's Way (encore presentation)	(re-release) Tim and Gregg are gone for New Year's Eve, so enjoy this classic episode of On Cinema.
113	January 3, 2012	Gone with the Wind	Tim and Gregg discuss Gone with the Wind
114	January 10, 2012	Misery	Tim and Gregg discuss Misery.
115	January 17, 2012	Driving Miss Daisy	Tim and Gregg discuss Driving Miss Daisy.
116	January 23, 2012	12 Angry Men	Tim and Gregg discuss 12 Angry Men.
117	January 31, 2012	Easy Rider	Tim and Gregg discuss Easy Rider
118	February 7, 2012	Bad News Bears	Tim and Gregg discuss Bad News Bears
119	February 14, 2012	For Your Eyes Only	Tim and Gregg discuss For Your Eyes Only.
120	February 21, 2012	Saving Private Ryan	Tim and Gregg discuss Saving Private Ryan.
121	February 28, 2012	Kramer versus Kramer	Tim and Gregg discuss Kramer versus Kramer.
122	March 5, 2012	Trinity and Beyond	Tim and Gregg discuss Trinity and Beyond.
123	March 12, 2012	Atomic Cafe and Radio Bikini	Tim and Gregg discuss Atomic Cafe and Radio Bikini.
124	March 19, 2012	Legal Eagles	Tim and Gregg discuss Legal Eagles.
125	March 26, 2012	Scenes from a Mall	Tim and Gregg discuss Scenes from a Mall.
126	April 2, 2012	Grease	Tim and Gregg discuss Grease.
127	April 9, 2012	One Flew Over the Cuckoo's Nest	Tim and Gregg discuss One Flew Over the Cuckoo's Nest.
128	April 16, 2012	The Three Stooges	Tim and Gregg discuss The Three Stooges.
Special	April 18, 2012	Special Thanks	Thanks for your support and listenership!
Special	April 20, 2012	The Music of The Three Stooges	Tim and Gregg discuss the music of The Three Stooges.
129	April 24, 2012	JFK	Tim and Gregg discuss JFK.
130	April 27, 2012	An Officer and A Gentleman	Tim Heidecker discusses the film An Officer and A Gentleman with his special guest Gregg Turkington.
131	May 4, 2012	The Addams Family	Tim Heidecker discusses the film The Addams Family with his special guest Gregg Turkington.
132	May 11, 2012	Being There	Tim Heidecker discusses the film Being There with his special guest Gregg Turkington.
133	May 18, 2012	Hunt for Red October	Tim Heidecker discusses the film Hunt for Red October with his special guest Gregg Turkington.
134	May 24, 2012	Krippendorf's Tribe	Tim and Gregg discuss Krippendorf's Tribe starring Richard Dreyfuss and Jenna Elfman.
135	June 4, 2012	300	Tim and Gregg discuss 300 with special guest Jordan Hoffman.
136	June 8, 2012	American Graffiti (Live from Modesto, CA!)	TIm and Gregg are LIVE in Modesto CA! Birthplace of George Lucas and setting for American Graffiti!!!!
Special	June 11, 2012	On Cinema Follow-up: George Lucas	Tim welcomes a special surprise guest to this studio to settle the debate as to where American Graffiti was filmed.
137	June 17, 2012	All That Jazz (Live from San Francisco)	Tim and Gregg are LIVE from Club Snazz in San Francisco, talking about Jazz and ALL That Jazz.
Special (Note: This episode is only available as a purchase from the website)	June 18, 2012	Stump the Buff Film Trivia Contest w/Gregg Turkington	N/A
138	June 21, 2012	Ice Age	Tim and Gregg discuss the snimated [sic] classic "Ice Age".
Special	July 2, 2012	Fan Favorites	Tim takes calls from listeners and discusses their favorite films. Special guest, Gregg Turkington. (Blade Runner, King of New York, Boogie Nights, Harry and the Hendersons, Match Point, Small Soldiers, Chariots of Fire, and The Long Goodbye)
139	July 6, 2012	The Smurfs	Tim and Gregg record a podcast on a plane! Discussing Smurfs.
Special	July 16, 2012	Best of the Early Shows	Tim signs off for the summer and plays some of his favorite shows from the "early period."
140	August 31, 2012	Dirty Harry	The On Cinema Family is BACK!! NEW THEME! New Energy! Tim welcomes back frequent host Gregg Turkington to discuss the classic film "Dirty Harry"
141	September 10, 2012	Love at First Bite	Tim welcomes guest Gregg Turkington to discuss the film parody "Love at First Bite" starring George Hamilton and Sherman Hemsley.
142	September 17, 2012	James Bond (guest host Gregg Turkington)	Tim cedes his On Cinema host chair to Gregg Turkington to discuss the films of James Bond.
143	September 24, 2012	Pink Panther	Tim welcomes guest Gregg Turkington to discuss the Pink Panther movie.
144	October 1, 2012	Runaway Train	Tim welcomes guest Gregg Turkington to discuss the film "Runaway Train".
145	October 8, 2012	Pretty Woman	Tim welcomes special guest Gregg Turkington to discuss "Pretty Woman" with Richard Gere.
146	October 15, 2012	Atlas Shrugged	Tim discusses the film "Atlas Shrugged" with special guest Gregg Turkington.
Special	October 22, 2012	Special Announcement	TIm [sic] has a special announcement.
Special	October 29, 2012	Extra Special Halloween Edition	A special Halloween episode of On Cinema with special guest, horror film expert Gregg Turkington. (Dead Heat)
Special	November 2, 2012	On Cinema at the Cinema Announcement	On Cinema at the Cinema premieres on thingx.com - be the first to watch the new reviews! This podcast is going on hiatus during the run of On Cinema At the Cinema!
Special	December 24, 2012	2nd Annual Holiday Special	Tim and Gregg are back just in time for Christmas! Hear their picks for some great holiday film recomnendations [sic].
Special	April 15, 2013	Back Again	Tim and Gregg talk about a movie called "Back Again"=." (Note: intentional incorrect syntax)
147	April 22, 2013	Courage Under Fire (guest host Gregg Turkington)	Fill in host Gregg Turkington discusses the film Courage Under Fire

=== Season 1 (2012–2013) ===
Episode	Air Date	Movies Reviewed
101	November 2, 2012	The Man with the Iron Fists, Flight
102	November 8, 2012	Skyfall, Lincoln
103	November 16, 2012	The Twilight Saga: Breaking Dawn – Part 2, Anna Karenina
104	November 21, 2012	Red Dawn, Life of Pi
105	November 29, 2012	The Frozen Ground, Universal Soldier: Day of Reckoning
106	December 6, 2012	Playing for Keeps, Hyde Park on Hudson
107	December 13, 2012	The Hobbit: An Unexpected Journey, Les Miserables
108	December 21, 2012	Zero Dark Thirty, Monsters, Inc. (3D Re-release)
109	December 27, 2012	Jack Reacher, Cirque du Soleil: Worlds Away
110	January 10, 2013	Parental Guidance, Django Unchained
Special	January 17, 2013	End of Season Bonus: The Best of On Cinema (Season One)

=== Season 2 (2013) ===
Episode	Air Date	Movies Reviewed
201	February 7, 2013	Side Effects, Identity Thief
202	February 14, 2013	A Good Day to Die Hard, Escape from Planet Earth
203	February 21, 2013	Snitch, Dark Skies
204	February 28, 2013	21 and Over, Jack the Giant Slayer
205	March 7, 2013	Oz the Great and Powerful, Dead Man Down
206	March 14, 2013	Carrie, The Incredible Burt Wonderstone
207	March 21, 2013	The Croods
Special	March 21, 2013	The First Annual Live On Cinema Oscars Show
208	March 28, 2013	G.I. Joe: Retaliation, Temptation: Confessions of a Marriage Counselor
209	April 4, 2013	The Company You Keep, Jurassic Park 3D
Special	April 5, 2013	A Tribute to Steven Spielberg in 3D
210	April 11, 2013	Oblivion, Scary Movie 5
Special	April 18, 2013	The Future of Cinema
Special	April 25, 2013	Tim and Gregg's Top 5 Films of 2013 So Far

=== Season 3 (2013) ===
Episode	Air Date	Movies Reviewed
301	July 7, 2013	The Lone Ranger, Despicable Me 2
302	July 14, 2013	Grown Ups 2, Pacific Rim
303	July 17, 2013	Turbo, Red 2
304	July 24, 2013	The Wolverine, Blue Jasmine
305	July 31, 2013	The Smurfs 2, 300: Rise of an Empire
306	August 7, 2013	Percy Jackson: Sea of Monsters, Elysium
307	August 14, 2013	Kick-Ass 2
308	August 21, 2013	The World's End, The Colony
309	August 28, 2013	One Direction: This is Us, Getaway
310	September 4, 2013	Riddick
Special	December 18, 2013	Christmas Special: The Hobbit: The Desolation of Smaug, A Madea Christmas

=== Season 4 (2014) ===
Episode	Air Date	Movies Reviewed
401	January 8, 2014	Lone Survivor, Her
402	January 15, 2014	The Nut Job, Ride Along
403	January 22, 2014	I, Frankenstein, Gimme Shelter
404	January 29, 2014	"On Alternative Medicine," That Awkward Moment, Labor Day
405	February 5, 2014	The Lego Movie, Robocop
406	February 11, 2014	Girl on a Bicycle, Endless Love
407	February 19, 2014	Pompeii
408	February 26, 2014	Welcome to Yesterday, Non-Stop
Special	March 4, 2014	Second Annual Live Oscars Special
409	March 5, 2014	Need For Speed, Walk of Shame
410	March 12, 2014	Muppets Most Wanted

=== Season 5 (2014) ===
Episode	Air Date	Movies Reviewed
501	July 2, 2014	Deliver Us from Evil, Tammy
502	July 9, 2014	Dawn of the Planet of the Apes, And So It Goes
503	July 16, 2014	Jupiter Ascending, Planes: Fire and Rescue
504	July 23, 2014	Wish I Was Here, Hercules, Magic in the Moonlight
505	July 30, 2014	Guardians of the Galaxy, Get on Up
506	August 6, 2014	Teenage Mutant Ninja Turtles, Into the Storm
507	August 13, 2014	Let's Be Cops, The Expendables 3
Special	August 13, 2014	On Cinema After Cinema featuring Tim's Mailbag
508	August 20, 2014	Sin City: A Dame to Kill For
509	August 27, 2014	The November Man, Jessabelle
510	September 3, 2014	Dark Places, The Green Inferno

=== Season 6 (2015) ===
Episode	Air Date	Movies Reviewed
601	February 4, 2015	Gregg's Episode: Jupiter Ascending, The SpongeBob Movie: Sponge Out of Water
602	February 11, 2015	Fifty Shades of Grey, Kingsman: The Secret Service
603	February 18, 2015	Hot Tub Time Machine 2, McFarland USA
Special	February 24, 2015	Official 3rd Annual Live Oscar Special
604	February 25, 2015	Focus, The Lazarus Effect
605	March 4, 2015	Chappie, The Second Best Exotic Marigold Hotel, No Escape
606	March 11, 2015	In the Heart of the Sea, Cinderella
607	March 18, 2015	The Divergent Series: Insurgent, The Gunman
608	March 25, 2015	Get Hard, Home
609	April 1, 2015	Furious 7, Woman in Gold
610	April 8, 2015	Ex Machina, The Moon and the Sun

=== Season 7 (2015) ===
Episode	Air Date	Movies Reviewed
701	September 9, 2015	Ant-Man, Fantastic Four
702	September 16, 2015	Black Mass, Maze Runner: The Scorch Trials
703	September 23, 2015	The Intern, Hotel Transylvania 2
704	September 30, 2015	The Forgiveness Special: The Martian, Sicario
705	October 7, 2015	Pan, Steve Jobs
706	October 14, 2015	Goosebumps, Bridge of Spies
707	October 21, 2015	Jem and the Holograms, Paranormal Activity: The Ghost Dimension
708	October 28, 2015	Collide, Scout's Guide to the Zombie Apocalypse
709	November 4, 2015	Spectre, The Peanuts Movie
710	November 11, 2015	Rings, By the Sea
Special	December 2, 2015	On Cinema Town Hall Live Special

=== Season 8 (2016) ===
Episode	Air Date	Movies Reviewed
Special	March 2, 2016	The 4th Annual Live On Cinema Oscar Special
801	July 27, 2016	Star Trek Beyond, Hillary's America
Special	July 28, 2016	Official Endorsement
802	August 3, 2016	Café Society, Jason Bourne
803	August 10, 2016	Suicide Squad, Nine Lives
804	August 17, 2016	Sausage Party, Pete's Dragon
805	August 24, 2016	Ben-Hur, Kubo and the Two Strings
806	August 31, 2016	Hands of Stone, Mechanic: Resurrection
807	September 7, 2016	Solace, The Light Between Oceans
808	September 14, 2016	Sully, When the Bough Breaks
809	September 21, 2016	Snowden, Bridget Jones's Baby
810	November 11, 2016	The Magnificent Seven, Storks

=== Season 9 (2017) ===
Episode	Air Date	Movies Reviewed
Special	February 26, 2017	Our Cinema Oscar Special LIVE
901	March 13, 2017	Kong: Skull Island, The Wall
902	March 20, 2017	T2 Trainspotting, The Belko Experiment
903	March 27, 2017	CHiPs, Power Rangers
904	April 3, 2017	The Boss Baby, The Zookeeper's Wife
905	April 10, 2017	Smurfs: The Lost Village, The Case for Christ
906	April 17, 2017	Fast and Furious 8, The Lost City of Z
907	April 24, 2017	Unforgettable, Animal Crackers, Born in China
908	May 1, 2017	The Circle, How to Be a Latin Lover
909	May 8, 2017	Guardians of the Galaxy Vol. 2, The Lovers
910	May 15, 2017	King Arthur: Legend of the Sword, Snatched

=== The Trial (2017) ===
This mini-series, known as "The Trial", introduced a new dynamic to the series, documenting the fictional murder trial against Tim Heidecker that was set up in season nine. The trial was staged similar to a real televised trial, took place over two weeks, and is approximately five hours long.

Episode	Air Date	Title
1	November 15, 2017	The Trial: Day 1
2	November 16, 2017	The Trial: Day 2
3	November 17, 2017	The Trial: Day 3
4	November 20, 2017	The Trial: Day 4
5	November 21, 2017	The Trial: Day 5
6	November 28, 2017	The Verdict

=== Season X (2018) ===
Season 10 premiered in January 2018 with a telethon fundraiser to crowdfund the annual Oscar Special. The season was known as "Season X."

Episode	Air Date	Movies Reviewed
Special	January 16, 2018	Oscar Special Live Telethon
Special	March 4, 2018	5th Annual Oscar Special
1001	March 22, 2018	Pacific Rim: Uprising, Sherlock Gnomes
1002	March 28, 2018	Ready Player One, Tyler Perry's Acrimony
1003	April 6, 2018	Chappaquiddick, You Were Never Really Here
1004	April 13, 2018	Sgt. Stubby: An American Hero , Overboard
1005	April 19, 2018	Rampage, Super Troopers 2
1006	April 25, 2018	Traffik
1007	May 3, 2018	Avengers: Infinity War
1008	May 10, 2018	Life of the Party, Breaking In
1009	May 17, 2018	Deadpool 2, Show Dogs
1010	May 25, 2018	Solo: A Star Wars Story

=== Season 11 (2019) ===
Season 11 premiered in January 2019 with another telethon fundraiser to crowdfund the Oscar Special.

Episode	Air Date	Movies Reviewed
Special	January 25, 2019	On Cinema Oscar Special Fundraising Telethon 2019!
Special	February 24, 2019	The New On Cinema Oscar Special
1101	September 25, 2019	Abominable, Judy
1102	October 2, 2019	Joker, The Current War
1103	October 9, 2019	Gemini Man, The Addams Family
1104	October 16, 2019	Mister America, Maleficent: Mistress of Evil
1105	October 23, 2019	Black and Blue, The Last Full Measure
1106	October 30, 2019	Terminator: Dark Fate, Motherless Brooklyn
1107	November 6, 2019	Midway, Arctic Dogs
1108	November 13, 2019	Charlie's Angels, The Report
1109	November 20, 2019	Frozen 2, 21 Bridges
1110	November 27, 2019	Knives Out, Queen & Slim

=== Season 12 (2019–2022) ===
Season 12 premiered in December 2019. The seventh Oscar Special was the last content to air on Adult Swim, as the series would move to HEI Network, an independent subscription service, in April 2021. The eighth Oscar special, hosted by Tim, streamed live on HEI Network, while the Ninth Annual Our Cinema Oscar Special (a competing special, hosted by Gregg) streamed live on YouTube.

Episode	Air Date	Movies Reviewed
Special	December 19, 2019	On Cinema Oscar Special 2020 Telethon
Special	February 9, 2020	The Seventh Annual On Cinema Oscar Special
Special	April 25, 2021	The Eighth Annual On Cinema Oscar Special
1201	October 6, 2021	Mass, No Time to Die
1202	October 13, 2021	Halloween Kills, The Last Duel
1203	October 20, 2021	Dune, The French Dispatch
1204	October 27, 2021	Last Night in Soho, Antlers
1205	November 3, 2021	The Harder They Fall, Eternals
1206	November 10, 2021	Red Notice, Ghostbusters: Afterlife
1207	November 17, 2021	King Richard, Top Gun: Maverick
1208	November 24, 2021	House of Gucci, Resident Evil: Welcome to Raccoon City
1209	December 1, 2021	Nightmare Alley
1210	December 8, 2021	American Underdog, West Side Story
Special	February 14, 2022	The Wendy Kerby Valentine's Day Special

=== Season 13 (2022–2023) ===
Episode	Air Date	Movies Reviewed
Special	March 27, 2022	The Ninth Annual On Cinema Oscar Special
1301	October 26, 2022	Prey for the Devil
1302	November 2, 2022	My Policeman, Enola Holmes 2
1303	November 9, 2022	Black Panther: Wakanda Forever, The Fabelmans
1304	November 16, 2022	The Menu, The Santa Clauses
1305	November 23, 2022	Devotion, Strange World
1306	November 30, 2022	Scrooge: A Christmas Carol, Violent Night
1307	December 7, 2022	Pinocchio, Something from Tiffany's
1308	December 14, 2022	A Man Called Otto, Avatar: The Way of Water
1309 (Special)	December 21, 2022	On Cinema And More In The Morning Christmas Special
1310	December 28, 2022	Alice, Darling
1311	January 4, 2023	M3GAN, The Amazing Maurice

=== Season 14 (2023–2024) ===
Episode	Air Date	Movies Reviewed
Special	March 12, 2023	The Tenth Annual On Cinema Oscar Special
1	Jan 3, 2024	Night Swim, Weak Layers
2	Jan 10, 2024	The Book of Clarence, Mean Girls
3	Jan 17, 2024	Founders Day, I.S.S.
4	Jan 24, 2024	Sometimes I Think About Dying, The Underdoggs
5	Jan 30, 2024	Argylle, The Promised Land
6	Feb 7, 2024	It Ends with Us
7	Feb 14, 2024	Madame Web, Bob Marley: One Love
8	Feb 21, 2024	Drive-Away Dolls
9	Feb 28, 2024	Dune: Part Two
10	Mar 6, 2024	Kung Fu Panda 4, Imaginary
Special	March 10, 2024	The Eleventh Annual On Cinema Oscar Special at Amatocon

=== Season 15 (2024–2025) ===
Episode	Air Date	Movies Reviewed
1	Dec 25, 2024	Babygirl, Nosferatu
2	Jan 1, 2025	The Damned, Wallace & Gromit: Vengeance Most Fowl
3	Jan 8, 2025	Den of Thieves 2: Pantera, Better Man
4	Jan 15, 2025	One of Them Days, Wolf Man
5	Jan 22, 2025	Flight Risk, Inheritance
6	Jan 29, 2025	Valiant One, Dog Man
7	Feb 5, 2025	Love Hurts, Heart Eyes
8	Feb 12, 2025	Captain America: Brave New World, Paddington in Peru
9	Feb 19, 2025	The Gorge, The Monkey
10	Feb 26, 2025	84 Charing Cross Road
Special	Mar 2, 2025	The Twelfth Annual On Cinema Oscar Special
Special	Jun 18, 2025	Summer Movie Roundup 2025

=== Season 16 (2025–2026) ===
Episode	Air Date	Movies Reviewed
1	Oct 1, 2025	The Strangers: Chapter 2, Gabby's Dollhouse: The Movie
2	Oct 8, 2025	Roofman, Kiss of the Spider Woman
3	Oct 15, 2025	Black Phone 2, Blue Moon
4	Oct 22, 2025	Springsteen: Deliver Me from Nowhere, Regretting You,The Watchers
5	Oct 29, 2025	Bugonia, Chainsaw Man - The Movie: Reze Arc
6	Nov 5, 2025	The Running Man, Predator: Badlands
7	Nov 12, 2025	Now You See Me: Now You Don't, Jay Kelly
8	Nov 19, 2025	Wicked: For Good
9 (Special)	Nov 26, 2025	Celebrating the life of Gabriel "G" Amato
10	Dec 3, 2025	Hamnet, Ella McCay, Five Nights at Freddy's 2
Special	Mar 15, 2026	The Last Oscar Special

=== Season 17 (2026–) ===
Episode	Air Date	Movies Reviewed
1	Oct 21, 2026	Clayface, Wildwood, The Odyssey
2	Oct 28, 2026	Christmas at the Kringles, The Mongoose
3	Nov 4, 2026	The Cat in the Hat, Wild Horse Nine
4	Nov 11, 2026	Ghost Soldier, Ebenezer
5	Nov 18, 2026	I Play Rocky, The Hunger Games: Sunrise on the Reaping

== Plot summary ==
=== Podcast ===
The On Cinema podcast was produced independently by Heidecker and Gregg. The podcast consists of Heidecker, along with Gregg as a "special guest" for almost every episode, covering movies poorly and with little insight, and often engaging in arguments. Gregg later developed a more pretentious "film buff" persona, and Tim took a turn to being obnoxiously political, sometimes devoting entire episodes to conspiracy theories, much to the chagrin of Gregg.

=== Seasons 1–6 ===
On Cinema at the Cinema launches as a video series in 2012. The series is similar to the podcast, taking place on a set meant to look like a movie theater. Gregg is still never acknowledged as more than a guest, and begins his recurring segments "Popcorn Classics", where he brings in forgotten VHS movies to showcase, and "On Cinema On Location", where he travels to filming locations of obscure movies, respectively.

Heidecker reveals in season 2 that he has blood clotting in his brain but rejects surgery because of "side effects, the whole medical industry, and Obamacare", while Gregg pushes for him to get surgery. He eventually does in season 3, although his first wife, Stephanie, divorces him for doing so. Tim continues to have health problems in season 4, and introduces his personal doctor, Dr. San (Zac Holtzman), an alternative medical doctor treating Tim with "natural" remedies, including acupuncture. Tim's face becomes infected and he denounces Dr. San. Tim moves to Jackson Hole, Wyoming in season 5, and buys a motorcycle to commute back and forth to Hollywood for the On Cinema taping. He becomes a proponent of 'simple living' and state rights, embracing his Republican values.

Late in season 2, Heidecker introduces Ayaka Ohwaki, a foreign exchange student from Japan staying with Tim's family. They start to date in season 3, until Ayaka was deported back to Japan. Ayaka sends a letter to Heidecker announcing that she is pregnant in season 4. Tim tries to convince Ayaka to have an abortion in season 5, despite his pro-life stance. Ayaka keeps the child and names him Tom Cruise Heidecker Junior, after Tim's favorite actor, Tom Cruise. She moves back to America and into Gregg's apartment. Tim denies paternity and moves permanently to Jackson Hole, making Gregg the host of the show. This was short-lived, as Tim realizes his friends in Jackson Hole were white supremacists. He returns as host in the second episode of season 6, moving in with Gregg and Ayaka. He rekindles his relationship with Ayaka and ultimately proposes to her at the end of season 6.

In season 3, Gregg begins his goal of watching "500 movies in 500 days", hoping to make the Guinness Book of World Records. He also gets even more into VHS collecting, introducing a confusing new coding system for organizing his tapes. Gregg interviews actor Joe Estevez in season 2, with Joe later becoming a recurring guest. Gregg continues to stubbornly insist that San Francisco was the location of Star Trek II, briefly leading to him being ejected off the show in season 3.

Annual live "Oscar Specials" start in 2013, airing at the same time as the Academy Awards. Tim often gets belligerently drunk, disrupting the planned events, being verbally and physically abusive, and upsetting Gregg. Mark Proksch is introduced in the second special, doing impersonations of W. C. Fields and Charlie Chaplin. In the third special, Peyton Reed comes on to promote his new film Ant-Man and announces that Gregg has been cast as a minor character in the movie, which upsets Tim.

Tim premieres his new show Decker during season 5, with Gregg initially angered by the fact Tim used footage of him without asking, although he later warms up to his role after positive fan feedback. Decker: Port of Call: Hawaii premieres during season 6, with Tim and Gregg repeatedly traveling to Hawaii to shoot, exhausting them. Gregg accidentally spoils the planned ending, resulting in Tim shooting a new ending where he destroys all of Gregg's tapes. Gregg leaves the show and plans to start his own.

=== Seasons 7–9 ===
Gregg moves to Victorville, California in season 7, and opens the Victorville Film Archives in a storage locker, where he also lives. He also shows pride in his role in Ant-Man, which Tim gives a rare one bag of popcorn. Tim praises Fantastic Four, which he has a minor role in, which Gregg claims he paid $15,000 to appear in. The show itself moves to Victorville in season 8 when Tim moves in with Gregg and they both buy an abandoned movie theater. The theater, Victorville Film Center, has nightly showings from Gregg's VHS collection. Mark is hired as a concessions cashier. Tim launches his own theater, Six Bags Cinema, in season 9, with recliner chairs and a waiter (also Mark) to serve food. The VFC burns down, with Gregg insinuating that Tim burned it down for the insurance money.

Tim starts a rock band named Dekkar with another member, Axiom, in season 7, and releases their debut single "Empty Bottle" on the show. Tim's new interest in music annoys Gregg, who just wants the show to focus on movies. The fourth Oscar Special features periodic musical performances by Dekkar and introduces the third member of the band, Manuel Giusti.

Ayaka gets a job, working for Dr. San. When Tim finds out about this, he storms off set to confront Dr. San, only for them to forgive each other. Dr. San takes over as Tom Cruise Junior's new pediatric doctor. By the season 7 finale, Tim announces that his son has died. Ayaka becomes pregnant again in season 8. After Tim tries to get her to have an abortion again, she leaves him and returns to Japan.

Dr. San prescribes Tim a "nutritional vape system" in season 8, which replaces all meals and food with an electronic cigarette full of supposed nutrients. Tim's physical condition worsens as he keeps using the vape, as he comes to the set sweating, bruised, unfocused and hallucinating. Eventually, Tim goes to an actual doctor who informs him his blood is full of illegal drugs. Tim quits and swears off Dr. San once again, only to relapse. A fire is started in the storage unit one night after Tim's vape pen overheats, burning the entire facility down, including the VFA. Tim suffers third degree burns on all of his body, including his face and hands. He returns to the show in bandages so he can keep working to pay for the damages and lawsuits, which exceed $1,000,000. Tim returns to a surprise intervention from Gregg, Joe, John Aprea, Mark, Ayaka, Ayaka's father, and Axiom, encouraging Tim to live a healthier life, which does not work. Due to his injuries, he retools Dekkar into an electronic band, known as DKR. Tim's skin dies in season 9 after he stops using facial cream for his burns. Tim chooses Manuel to give him a skin transplant, with Axiom giving Tim his right hand.

To get Gregg to return for season 7, Tim promised to let him write, direct, produce the next season of Decker. This season, titled Gregg Turkington's Decker vs. Dracula, is cancelled after three episodes after Tim lambasted Gregg for making a "mockery" of the franchise, irritating Gregg. A fourth season, Decker: Unclassified, premieres on Adult Swim in 2016. While Tim is the main producer again, some of Gregg's ideas, including Dracula, are retained. A fifth and sixth season, Unsealed and Mindwipe respectively, premiered in 2017.

=== The Trial ===
In season 9, Tim hosts the Electric Sun Desert Music Festival in Apple Valley, California, where Dr. San gives out free samples of his vape system, resulting in 20 deaths and over 100 injuries. Tim and Dr. San are arrested and jailed on murder and manslaughter charges. Tim, with his lawyer, Doug Lyman, pins the 20 deaths on Dr. San and the Apple Valley authorities who did not respond in time. However, Dr. San commits suicide in jail, so the relatives of the 20 who died now primarily blame Tim for the deaths.

Tim is put on trial for the death of the "Electric Sun 20". Frustrated with his attorney Mark Dwyer, Tim decides to represent himself and proceeds to threaten the prosecution led by Vincent Rosetti and its witnesses and falsify evidence. Tim is issued multiple contempt citations. Nicholas Meyer, director of Star Trek II and co-writer for Star Trek IV, appears as one of the witnesses in an attempt by Tim to settle the San Francisco Star Trek argument with Gregg. Ultimately, Tim is found not guilty for only one of the 20 deaths, as that victim died of a heroin overdose. A mistrial is called for the remaining 19, due to a hung jury with 11 guilty and 1 not guilty verdicts.

=== Seasons 10–11 ===
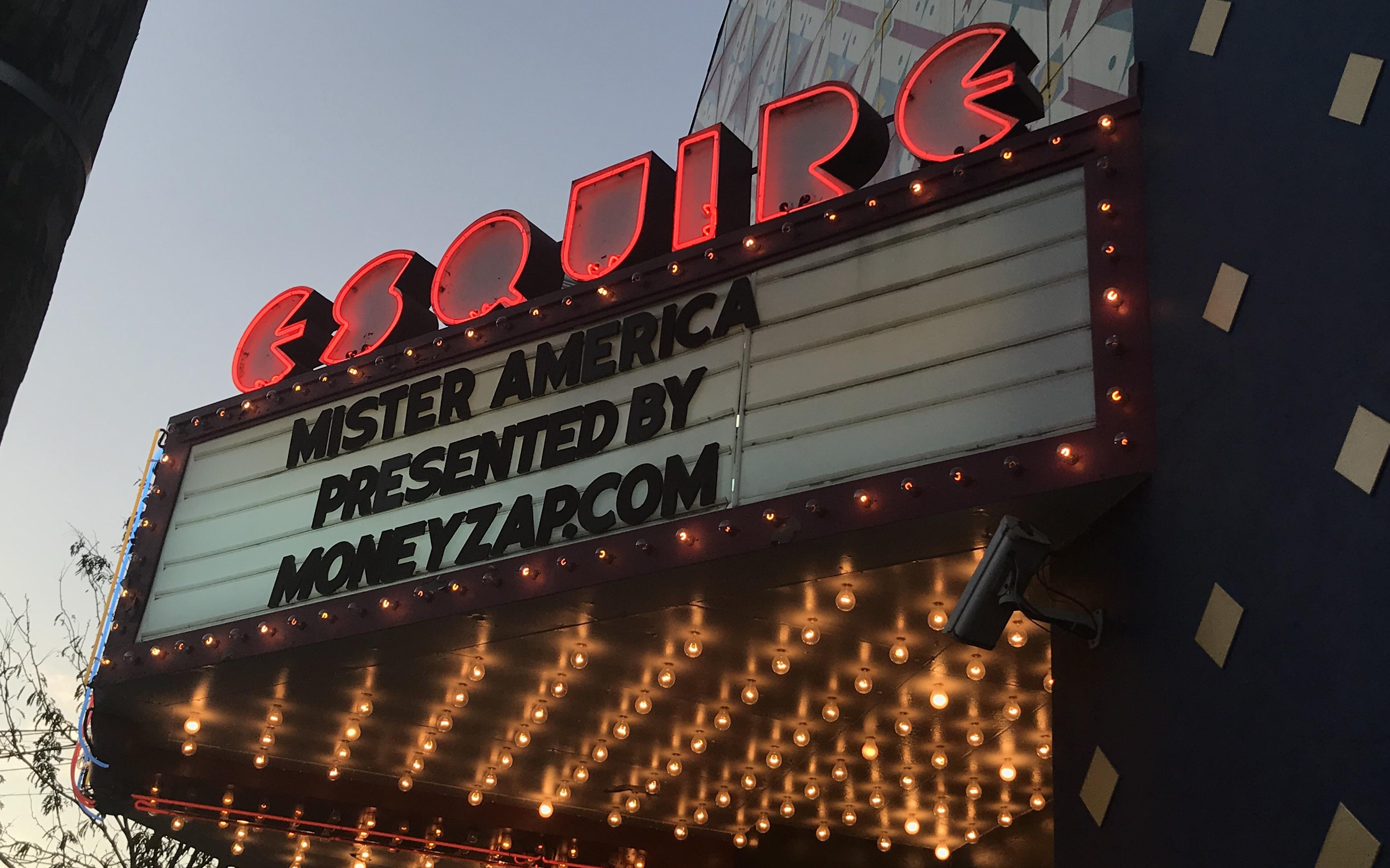
A film marquee for Mister America drawing on an On Cinema at the Cinema joke for the defunct loan website Moneyzap.com

Tim revamps On Cinema in season 10, also known as "Season X", with a new intro and set, and filmed episodes 4 through 6 in 360-degree video. The revamp faces a snag after a civil suit from the Delgado family, a family of one of the Electric Sun victims, is filed. Tim's assets, including On Cinema and Decker, are seized, Rio Jenesis drops its sponsorship, and he faces potential bankruptcy. He manages to convince the family of one of the victims, the Delgados, to let him try to earn money for them with his various assets. The Delgado Media Holdings company is created and they hire Gregg as the managing editor, giving him creative control. Gregg's role quickly increases to that of host, while Tim's role was diminished to announcer. In the season finale, an irate Tim destroys the set, insults the Delgados, and announces his campaign for district attorney of San Bernardino County against the incumbent Vincent Rosetti. This campaign fails, and Tim is booted off the show.

During the fifth Oscar Special, Mark is locked tight into a standard diving dress while doing an impression of Matt Hooper from Jaws, but is knocked out from asphyxiation and enters a coma. Gregg takes care of comatose Mark and uses this to relaunch the VFA, which appears to now be several bins full of VHS tapes stocked in Mark's hospital room. Gregg also starts collecting and wearing movie promotional hats to Tim's vocal displeasure.

Delgado Media Holdings produces the sixth Oscar Special, hosted by Rafael Torres, with Gregg in charge of the show. Tim breaks into the studio with militant conspiracy theorist Michael "LaRue" Matthews, to wrest control and promote QAnon theories. Tim accidentally maces Torres, and manages to erase Gregg's tape collection with his magnetic vest. A comatose Mark is used by Gregg as a "living Oscar"; Tim accidentally resuscitates Mark by knocking him over. Delgado Media Holdings is sold back to Tim with the help of a suspicious money lending vendor called MoneyZap, which Tim uses to start season 11. LaRue becomes a member of Dekkar and raps about the deep state in a new remix of "Empty Bottle".

Gregg starts the Mobile VFA in season 11, which consists of him and Mark simply selling VHS tapes on the flea market. Later, he starts up a VFA Classic Movie program, where he sells public domain movies with commentary dubbed over the originals. Gregg bundles the original A Star Is Born with the 2018 adaptation, believing it to have entered the public domain along with the original, which gets Mark arrested for bootlegging. Mark gets put into a coma again while in prison and goes missing after being discharged from the hospital. Greg also launches a site known as Oscores.net, a site he created to grade each Oscar ceremony.

Tim's failed campaign for district attorney is covered in Mister America, which was distributed by Magnolia Pictures and released on October 4, 2019, at Beyondfest, held at Grauman's Egyptian Theatre. The film introduces Toni Newman, the lone juror who voted not guilty at Tim's trial, who becomes Tim's campaign manager. Tim calls the film a sham after its release during season 11, and doxxes the film's director, "Josh Lorton" (Eric Notarnicola), as retaliation. Toni becomes CFO of HEI Inc. and advises Tim to disband Dekkar and fire Joe Estevez. Tim and Toni marry at the end of the season.

Tim annuls his marriage in the seventh Oscar Special in order to stage a more elaborate second wedding with her. Gregg arrives at the wedding dressed as the Joker, driving his car housing the Mobile VFA onto the set. Gregg leaves his car running throughout the special, causing the entire production crew and wedding party to fall unconscious to carbon monoxide poisoning, leading to two deaths.

=== Season 12 ===
The show moves to HEI Network, a subscription streaming service created by Tim, in early 2021. Tim and Gregg host separate Oscar specials in 2021. Tim and Toni host their special in a studio similar to that of a talk show, while Gregg hosts his special in the Mobile VFA. Tim reluctantly calls Gregg after being dissatisfied with Axiom's movie knowledge and invites him onto his show. Gregg later storms off set and back to his car after LaRue declares him guilty for the deaths from the last special, and runs over LaRue after he gets in the way, later leaving him in a wheelchair. Gregg sells off the VFA to Tim in exchange for no charges being pressed.

Season 12 starts with a new intro, theme, and set. Toni, drunk at her birthday party, has an affair with Axiom. Toni goes to rehab for her drinking problems while Axiom is kicked out of Dekkar. The band is renamed to D4, with Wendy Kerby, a singer from Tim and Toni's church introduced in the prior Oscar Special, joining. Toni is released from rehab and tells Tim she is leaving him, confessing she was a heavy alcoholic for the entire time she had known Tim and that she knew he was guilty. Mark is again spotted by a fan, this time performing as Spider-Man on a street in Hollywood. Tim convinces Mark to return. Gregg reveals that he is working with Joe on a new movie, Deck of Cards, focusing on "the original Joker", the playing card.

Tim and Wendy Kerby host a Valentine's Day special in 2022. After an awkward staged sketch where Tim tries to instigate a kiss between Wendy and Manuel, she becomes uncomfortable and abruptly leaves, leaving D4 unable to perform. Manuel convinces Tim to patch things up with Axiom, and the three give an impromptu Dekkar reunion.

=== Season 13 (On Cinema! and More in the Morning) ===
The ninth Oscar Special takes place at the planned site of the HEI Ranch, Tim's proposed business and media center, located on a remote stretch of land near Apple Valley, California. Little work has been done, with construction vehicles everywhere and the water brown and dirty. Gregg unveils the VFA Tour Bus, made from a hastily remodeled van. G. Amato, a financial backer with more HEI Points than anyone else, is introduced. The cast and crew are harassed by locals who drive dirt bikes on set, point rifle lasers, sabotage the power from the generator, and ultimately fire upon the crew at the end of the special. Gregg evacuates everyone in his tour bus except for Tim, who confronts the locals and gets injured.

Deck of Cards released on September 2, 2022, albeit heavily edited by Tim, making a program similar to Decker. Season 13 debuted October 26, with the program being retooled into a morning show titled On Cinema! and More in the Morning. Kaili Amato now co-hosts, with The Amato Group providing funding and the new venue. Kaili and Tim expand the focus from films to social media and Hollywood in general, with Gregg included for movie discussion. A Dekkar reunion tour goes awry when their tour bus, the VFA Tour Bus, rolls into a ditch late at night, injuring Tim, temporarily blinding Axiom, and leaving Manuel unconscious for weeks. When Manuel gains consciousness again, he is unable to understand English.

After the crash, Tim starts drinking the brown grain water at the HEI Ranch, which contains lithium and other materials, claiming the water is healing him, despite it frequently making him throw up. Tim has a doctor lethally inject him in order to prove the grain water unlocks immortality; although it did not kill him, he remained unconscious and had to be hospitalized. After two weeks, Tim is released only to find out that his trailer at the HEI Ranch, with all of his personal belongings, was removed. Attempts to contact Axiom, Manuel, and G. Amato fail. Gregg offers to let Tim stay at his house, with Tim accepting and thanking him for being a friend.

=== Season 14 (On Cinema On Demand) ===
The tenth Oscar Special celebrates 10 years of Gregg's movie expertise, complete with musical numbers and a Gregg-themed set. Tributes to Gregg are provided by Tim, Joe, the Queen of Hearts from Deck of Cards, Dudley Moore, and Corwin Allard, who portrayed a young Decker in Decker: Unsealed. Tim's initial support and praise of Gregg turns sour once G. Amato reaffirms his support for Tim and calls him a second son. Gregg launches the VFN, a streaming network for classic films. The service, consisting of a Dropbox folder full of public domain movies, unintentionally includes dashcam footage of the VFA Tour Bus crash, which appears to show Tim intentionally swerving the car into traffic in a suicide attempt, before turning into a ditch. The footage spreads to Twitter and eventually to the people on set. Tim, fully dressed as Pinocchio for a planned scene, plays the footage live. Axiom and Manuel swiftly leave afterward, leaving Tim to have a violent, emotional breakdown with only G. Amato, dressed as Geppetto, consoling him.

On Cinema is retooled once more, as a video podcast titled On Cinema On Demand. Tim refers to himself as T. Amato, calling G. Amato "dad". Tim no longer reviews movies as he claims to have a disorder that makes him confuse films with reality, which disorients and horrifies him. Gregg continues to review films, as does Joey Patrocelli, the show's new co-host, who uses a four-star system and decries wokeness in Hollywood. Tim announces AmatoCon, a 3-day business convention hosted by The Amato Group, with the final night's events (March 10, coincidentally the same night as the Oscars) being streamed online. Axiom and Manuel cut ties with Tim, continuing Dekkar with a new band member, Corwin. They release a new single called "Ride with the Devil", subtly comparing Tim to the devil. Tim blasts the new song as awful, calls Corwin a Judas, and suggests that Axiom and Manuel should be deported. Tim later challenges the band to perform at AmatoCon against "T. Amato and the Empty Bottle Players" to determine which band is the real Dekkar. Gregg starts trying to bond with Kaili after finding out she is a fan of Harry Potter, giving her presents and tickets to see the movies with him, which she doesn't follow through on.

Joe starts giving legal advice on the show as "Judge" Joe Estevez. In his first segment, he mentions that the district attorney is looking into reopening the Electric Sun case, with Toni assisting. Tim states that "we can't allow that" and briefly leaves the set. A couple of weeks later, Toni's son, Matt, was injured in a shooting. Toni appears on the show to ask for support. Security cam footage of the shooting is played, showing a heavily disguised man ringing the doorbell, asking if Toni is there, and getting shot by Matt and firing back Toni stresses that she has refused to participate in the reopening of the case, wanting to move on from her mistakes. Joey is notably absent for three episodes. It is revealed in the following episode that Matt has died from his injuries. At the end of the season, G. Amato promises Tim that he will receive a 2018 Dodge Charger if AmatoCon is a success.

This season was accompanied by an audio edition across multiple streaming platforms. The first few episodes feature loudly blaring advertisements placed mid-sentence during the show and subsequent episodes feature all manner of audio problems to the point where ads are broadcast on top of the episode's audio and multiple ads will play simultaneously, making unintelligible noise. The final episode just features a spot for AmatonCon that runs on repeat for 21 minutes.

On the last day of AmatoCon, Tim gives a confusing and ultimately aborted keynote address on the “gift” of his disorder, in front of a sparse and indifferent audience. He teases and antagonises Joey throughout the night, and holds an in memoriam segment for Matt, alongside Toni, who relapses into alcoholism again with Tim. Gregg, relegated to a VFA booth to the side of the main stage, uses a new “Movie Links” segment to propose to Kaili, gifting her VHS tapes linked in their titles by the theme of a wedding. Upon gifting her a copy of Marry Me!, Kaili escapes backstage, leaving a visibly upset Gregg crouched behind his stall. Based on the decision of judges Richie Onori and Stevie Stewart and "America's Favorite Judge" Joe Estevez, Tim emerges victorious in his battle of the bands against Dekkar, after which Axiom and Manuel make peace with Tim, while casting out Corwin. At the finale, G. Amato performs the “quality of mercy” speech from The Merchant of Venice, and sings a hymn. He judges Tim’s involvement in the convention to be disappointing, and so punishes him by not relinquishing the Charger. In a fit of rage Tim, followed by Joey and Gregg, steals the keys and tries to enter the vehicle outside the convention center. Joey temporarily stuns Gregg and attacks Tim, who staggers back into the convention center with his face covered in blood, tells Toni that the Amatos are responsible for Matt’s death, and collapses to the ground.

=== Season 15 (On Cinema at the Cinema at Movie House) ===
Between seasons, Joaquin Gabriel Neville was arrested for the murder of Matt Newman, who had been extorting a relative of Joaquin's for explicit photography. He was reported to have acted alone. The Amato Group cuts ties with Tim and the HEI Network, while also reaching a cash settlement relating to Gregg's assault. G. Amato retires as president, with the real estate company now focusing primarily on event planning. Gregg uses the cash settlement to acquire a majority stake into the HEI Network and buy the house seen in The People Under the Stairs, now dubbed the "Movie House", which becomes the setting of season 15. Gregg intends to make the place a tourist attraction, while Tim, now known as Newman Heidecker, moves in with Toni following financial difficulties. Gregg hires Mark to renovate the house, including scraping off old paint and mold without a mask.

Newman soon begins reconnecting with G. Amato, trying to discuss the rebuilding of their relationship, with Gregg adamant that doing so would be considered a violation of his settlement's NDA. Gregg also announces plans to make a sequel to Zombie 2, titled Zombie 2 2. Problems increase with the house having no water, and Tim insisting there is a rat infestation caused by Gregg's massive bags of popcorn all around the house, while Tim also begins a massage service at Movie House. Things come to a head after a burst pipe floods the house and the police raid the house accusing Tim of running a brothel from his "massage service", leading to the leaseholder to announce plans on evicting Movie House before the Oscar Special.

== See also ==
- List of Decker episodes, the 2014 web and TV spin-off of On Cinema.
