= Bad Timing (Adventure Time) =

- Adventure Time episode
- Lumpy Space Princess and Johnnie appear, centered. The episode is framed with its main action bordered circularly in the center; the outer margins are inhabited by drawings.
- Episode no.: Season 5 Episode 49
- Directed by: Adam Muto (Note: Supervising director); Nick Jennings (Note: Art director)
- Written by: Pendleton Ward; Kent Osborne
- Story by: Kent Osborne; Pendleton Ward; Jack Pendarvis; Adam Muto
- Production code: 1014-160
- Original air date: March 3, 2014

Episode chronology
← Previous "Betty"	Next → "Lemonhope Part 1"
- Adventure Time season 5

"Bad Timing" is the forty-ninth episode from the fifth season of Adventure Time, an animated television series. It was written by Pendleton Ward, who created the show, and Kent Osborne, its head of story from a story they developed along with Jack Pendarvis and the current showrunner, Adam Muto. In the episode, Lumpy Space Princess falls in love with a former mate (Mark Proksch) from secondary school. When she suspects she has lost her date to Princess Bubblegum, she attempts to wield time travel to win back his affections.

Visually unique to this episode, it comprises two frames: a circular inner frame holds the main story, while the outer margins carry small creatures. The writers likened the story to revisiting a former high school peer who was, at the time, unnoticeable. Originally aired on March 3, 2014, this broadcast was seen by more than one million viewers. Writers of entertainment-related publications praised the episode for its depth of mood and visuals. The New Yorker critic Emily Nussbaum, in particular, saw it as establishing Lumpy Space Princess's intricacy as a character, and Eric Kohn in IndieWire called the episode the pièce de résistance of the show.

== Background ==
Adventure Time follows the adventures of principal characters Finn the Human, aged 16, and Jake the Dog. Recurring characters featured in "Bad Timing" include Princess Bubblegum and Lumpy Space Princess. As she governs her kingdom of candy people, Bubblegum works as a scientist on varying experiments. Meanwhile, Lumpy Space Princess (Pendleton Ward), portrayed as a valley girl, is the source of drama due to her arrogant personality and shallow relationships with others.

== Plot ==
Princess Bubblegum demonstrates to company a device capable of time travel. Lumpy Space Princess comes in and demands Bubblegum transport Lumpy Space Princess back to when she and her ex were still in love. Bubblegum explains that the machine is only capable of logging molecules of a given entity. Lumpy Space Princess attacks her, and Bubblegum forces her to leave.

Lamenting at a bar, she meets Johnnie (Mark Proksch), a former mate at their secondary school. Johnnie confesses his anxiety regarding a scheduled interview with Bubblegum for a business venture. Lumpy Space Princess advises that he fix his posture as to appear more confident. Johnnie thanks Lumpy Space Princess for her advice and invites her to his complex. Looking through Johnnie's record collection, Lumpy Space Princess finds a copy of Frank Zappa's album Apostrophe (') and plays a joke by putting the album cover (displaying Zappa's face) in front of her own face. As a result of their pleasant evening, the two fall in love and share good nights. When Johnnie finds Lumpy Space Princess absent in the morning, he suspects that she has abandoned him. Much to his relief, he finds her waiting for breakfast in his kitchen. When he returns from the interview, he reveals he has been invited to a separate meeting with Bubblegum at her castle. Lumpy Space Princess asks that she appear with him, but Johnnie says the meeting is private. Supposing Bubblegum has stolen his heart, Lumpy Space Princess leaves in a fit of rage.

Delivering a monologue on the passion necessary for love, Lumpy Space Princess hurls a Molotov cocktail and hot-wiring a gas truck into the castle. Bubblegum considers its impact an attack on her kingdom and tells Johnnie to hide at the foot of their desk. When Lumpy Space Princess finds Johnnie, she uses the device on him, attempting to revert him to when he loved her. Johnnie disappears; when Bubblegum figures out what has happened, she informs Lumpy Space Princess that by failing to log his molecules, he no longer exists as part of their universe. To avoid having to grieve, Lumpy Space Princess asks Bubblegum to use the device, properly, on her. Erased of her memory past her attacking Bubblegum, Lumpy Space Princess storms out. Bubblegum pours herself a drink.

== Production ==
This episode is the forty-ninth from the fifth season of Adventure Time. Visually, the episode is framed having the important events of the story occur in its center, bordered circularly. Small polygonal creatures appear in the margins of the outer frame. Film and television critic Eric Kohn, in IndieWire, dubbed the inner frame a time bubble, absorbing the creatures Bubblegum experiments on with the time travel device. Following Lumpy Space Princess having her memory erased in the episode, Johnnie appears in the outer frame.

"Bad Timing" was written and storyboarded by Pendleton Ward and Kent Osborne; the episode's plotline was developed by Ward, Osborne, Jack Pendarvis, and Adam Muto. The creator of Adventure Time, Ward resigned from his occupation as its runner during production of the season. Osborne is the head of story. Alluding to the episode, for Hulu, Muto and Osborne summarized it as Lumpy Space Princess confounding the concept of time travel. The writers related the episode to "one of those situations where you run into someone from high school and you're like, 'Woah, why didn't I ever notice you before?'" Alluded to in this episode, the one it precedes involves time travel as well.

== Release and reception ==
Cartoon Network originally aired "Bad Timing" on March 3, 2014. Over a million and a half people saw the episode live on broadcast. (Note: According to Son of the Bronx, less than one percent of all 18- to 49-year-old residents of households with television sets watched the episode, as indicated by Nielsen ratings.) Television critic Emily Nussbaum gave this episode praise in The New Yorker, comparing it to a fairy tale characterized by laughter and sorrow. Kohn called its mood happy yet miserable the same, evoking more emotions as a whole than even the preceding episode. The A.V. Club writer Oliver Sava gave it an A grade, finding it, like Kohn, emotionally intense. Kohn praised the episode for supplying Lumpy Space Princess, a usually arrogant character, with a tragic circumstance. Sava saw the character as more explored that way. Nussbaum, who considered the episode proof of her intricacy as a character, wrote that Lumpy Space Princess appropriately shows pathos.

Sava specifically lauded the monologue delivered by Lumpy Space Princess for showing her consistent strength that makes her so admirable. He further praised how the episode was capable of condensing mature topics for children the show is aimed at in a humorous way. Kohn opined the episode helms the "waters of eroticism" responsibly. In the Adventure Time–dedicated podcast Conversation Parade, hosted by John Moe and Open Mike Eagle, Moe found Johnnie written so "incredibly complicated, whimsy, and sad" that he performed – with the direction of guest Osborne – some of his lines on the podcast.

Kohn regarded its visuals as the pinnacle of the show. Sava wrote that the notion of time being a flat circle could have inspired the circular shape of the inner frame. He noted the use of color beyond the circle as a way to convey the many emotions evoked for the whole of the episode. Ignoring this device, Sava saw its use as humorous diversions while it contributed to the splendor. Nussbaum described the creatures appearing in the outer frame as annotative and a mute chorus, suggesting they live in a parallel universe of both connection and isolation. The episode was later released on DVD twice, first in the year of that broadcast, as part of the Princess Day box set, and later in 2015, as part of a box set for the complete fifth season. Home video critic Justin Remer called "Bad Timing" "surprisingly devastating" in DVD Talk. Kohn summed up the episode's climax as the pièce de résistance of Adventure Time.
