= List of Decker episodes =

Decker is an American comedy web series & television series created by Tim Heidecker and Gregg Turkington. The show is a web spinoff/tie-in to the series On Cinema at the Cinema on July 17, 2014. Recurring jokes and the personas and mutual antipathies expressed by Decker and Turkington carry over from the relationship of the "real" actors in On Cinema. Season 4 and onwards is aired on TV via Adult Swim.

== Series overview ==
Season	Title	Episodes	Originally released		
Season	Title	Episodes	First released	Last released	Network
1	Classified	5	July 17, 2014	August 14, 2014	YouTube/Adultswim.com
2	Port of Call: Hawaii	20	March 9, 2015	April 3, 2015	YouTube/Adultswim.com
3	Gregg Turkington's; Decker Vs. Dracula	4 (& 2 specials)	October 12, 2015	December 2, 2015	YouTube/Adultswim.com
4	Unclassified	6	June 17, 2016	July 29, 2016	Adult Swim
5	Unsealed	6	June 4, 2017	July 9, 2017	Adult Swim
6	Mindwipe	6	July 16, 2017	August 20, 2017	Adult Swim
7	The Animated Adventures of Jack Decker	1 pilot	July 3, 2020		Adult Swim
8	Deck of Cards	1 short film (& 1 special)	September 2, 2022	October 12, 2022	HEI Network

== Episodes ==
=== Season 1: Classified (2014) ===
No. overall	No. in season	Title	Directed by	Written by	Original release date	Prod. code
1	1	"Episode 1"	Eric Notarnicola	Tim Heidecker & Gregg Turkington	July 17, 2014	101
Special agent Jack Decker takes on terror threats in Afghanistan to keep the world we know safe and secure. When the President himself is too scared to take on Al Qaeda, Decker steps in to extract valuable information from his source- information that could shake the very foundations of our free world.
2	2	"Episode 2"	Eric Notarnicola	Tim Heidecker & Gregg Turkington	July 24, 2014	102
After making his way into the Oval Office, Decker tells the president the hard facts about the terrorist nuclear threat. Does President Davidson have enough integrity to give Jack Decker the resources he needs to fight terror, or will our hero have to take things into his own hands?
3	3	"Episode 3"	Eric Notarnicola	Tim Heidecker & Gregg Turkington	July 31, 2014	103
With an explosive suitcase in-hand, Decker struggles to get answers from the President's tight-lipped code expert. Will he break the three-digit code and reveal the sensitive information contained within the case? Or will the explosion destroy the United States capital and two centuries' worth of American history?
4	4	"Episode 4"	Eric Notarnicola	Tim Heidecker & Gregg Turkington	August 7, 2014	104
The suitcase has been opened, the nuclear threat analyzed, and, to Decker, the course of action is clear. Will the weak-willed president Davidson allow Decker to do what's necessary to protect America's citizens? What sacrifices will have to be made to save our nation?
5	5	"Episode 5"	Eric Notarnicola	Tim Heidecker & Gregg Turkington	August 14, 2014	105
Decker returns to the White House to inform President Davidson of the "Manhattan Incident."

=== Season 2: Port of Call: Hawaii (2015) ===
No. overall	No. in season	Title	Directed by	Written by	Original release date	Prod. code
6	1	"Port Of Call: Hawaii – Episode 1"	Eric Notarnicola	Tim Heidecker & Gregg Turkington	March 9, 2015	201
Decker is back! This time he's relaxing beachside on the beautiful and reclusive island of Hawaii. Not even calls from the president can stop this R&R.
7	2	"Port Of Call: Hawaii – Episode 2"	Eric Notarnicola	Tim Heidecker & Gregg Turkington	March 10, 2015	202
Decker reconnects with his oldest and dearest friend, Lanoi Arnold. As celebration, he performs his hit song.
8	3	"Port Of Call: Hawaii – Episode 3"	Eric Notarnicola	Tim Heidecker & Gregg Turkington	March 11, 2015	203
The future of Decker's vacation is placed in peril. Will he shun responsibility, or will he step up to the challenge?
9	4	"Port Of Call: Hawaii – Episode 4"	Eric Notarnicola	Tim Heidecker & Gregg Turkington	March 12, 2015	204
Decker learns a fellow patriot might not be all that he seems. He goes on the hunt, ready for revenge.
10	5	"Port Of Call: Hawaii – Episode 5"	Eric Notarnicola	Tim Heidecker & Gregg Turkington	March 13, 2015	205
Decker tracks down Agent Kington and learns a deeply hidden secret.
11	6	"Port Of Call: Hawaii – Episode 6"	Eric Notarnicola	Tim Heidecker & Gregg Turkington	March 14, 2015	206
With time running out for the president, Decker comes up with an ingenious plan to gain new intel.
12	7	"Port Of Call: Hawaii – Episode 7"	Eric Notarnicola	Tim Heidecker & Gregg Turkington	March 17, 2015	207
Decker takes to the water on a specially built jet ski. Meanwhile, Kington acquires a tape from a suspicious source.
13	8	"Port Of Call: Hawaii – Episode 8"	Eric Notarnicola	Tim Heidecker & Gregg Turkington	March 18, 2015	208
Lanoi reveals new concerns about Decker to Special Agent Kington.
14	9	"Port Of Call: Hawaii – Episode 9"	Eric Notarnicola	Tim Heidecker & Gregg Turkington	March 19, 2015	209
Decker and Kington decide the only way forward is through jungle warfare.
15	10	"Port Of Call: Hawaii – Episode 10"	Eric Notarnicola	Tim Heidecker & Gregg Turkington	March 20, 2015	210
Decker declares the time for strategy is over. They must take action or the island, and America, will be lost.
16	11	"Port Of Call: Hawaii – Episode 11"	Eric Notarnicola	Tim Heidecker & Gregg Turkington	March 23, 2015	211
Decker and Kington infiltrate the terrorists' secret compound. A disgraced President Davidson looks back on his legacy.
17	12	"Port Of Call: Hawaii – Episode 12"	Eric Notarnicola	Tim Heidecker & Gregg Turkington	March 24, 2015	212
With Hawaii on the brink of destruction, President Davidson calls Decker for the latest intel.
18	13	"Port Of Call: Hawaii – Episode 13"	Eric Notarnicola	Tim Heidecker & Gregg Turkington	March 25, 2015	213
Decker attempts a risky plan that, if completed, will gain him access to the location of every terrorist on the island.
19	14	"Port Of Call: Hawaii – Episode 14"	Eric Notarnicola	Tim Heidecker & Gregg Turkington	March 26, 2015	214
With Decker's guidance, Kington learns the true meaning of why good men fight.
20	15	"Port Of Call: Hawaii – Episode 15"	Eric Notarnicola	Tim Heidecker & Gregg Turkington	March 27, 2015	215
Decker takes to the jungle in an aggressive attack against the Taliban.
21	16	"Port Of Call: Hawaii – Episode 16"	Eric Notarnicola	Tim Heidecker & Gregg Turkington	March 30, 2015	216
With Decker in the field, President Davidson calls Kington for the latest updates.
22	17	"Port Of Call: Hawaii – Episode 17"	Eric Notarnicola	Tim Heidecker & Gregg Turkington	March 31, 2015	217
Decker continues his jungle assault only to come across a massive breach in security.
23	18	"Port Of Call: Hawaii – Episode 18"	Eric Notarnicola	Tim Heidecker & Gregg Turkington	April 1, 2015	218
Trapped in a terrorist hideout with no options, Decker turns to Kington in a last ditch effort for freedom.
24	19	"Port Of Call: Hawaii – Episode 19"	Eric Notarnicola	Tim Heidecker & Gregg Turkington	April 2, 2015	219
Decker uses his CIA training to gain hard-hitting intel.
25	20	"Port Of Call: Hawaii – Episode 20"	Eric Notarnicola	Tim Heidecker & Gregg Turkington	April 3, 2015	220
In order to save the nation, Decker must come face-to-face with pure evil.

=== Season 3: Gregg Turkington's Decker Vs. Dracula (2015) ===
No. overall	No. in season	Title	Directed by	Written by	Original release date	Prod. code
26	1	"Decker 3 - Episode 1"	Eric Notarnicola	Tim Heidecker & Gregg Turkington	October 12, 2015	301
Fresh from Hawaii, Decker must confront and defeat a new grave terror that threatens every man woman and child on planet earth!
27	2	"Gregg Turkington's Decker Vs. Dracula - Episode 2"	Eric Notarnicola	Tim Heidecker & Gregg Turkington	October 13, 2015	302
Special Agent Kington embarks to Transylvania, where he must face a horrifying trio!
28	3	"Gregg Turkington's Decker Vs. Dracula - Episode 3"	Eric Notarnicola	Tim Heidecker & Gregg Turkington	October 14, 2015	303
When President Davidson heads to Transylvania, Decker must assume the most powerful position in the free world!
29	4	"Decker Vs. Dracula - Episode 4"	Eric Notarnicola	Tim Heidecker & Gregg Turkington	October 15, 2015	304
Buckling to pressure, Decker makes a fateful decision.

==== Specials (2015) ====
Title	Directed by	Written by	Original release date
"Decker Vs. Dracula: Behind the Truth"	Eric Notarnicola; Tim Heidecker & Gregg Turkington (uncredited)	Tim Heidecker & Gregg Turkington	December 2, 2015
Decker creator and star, Tim Heidecker, sheds light on the troubled production, Decker Vs. Dracula. (A Heidecker Doc Production.)
"Decker Versus Dracula: The Lost Works"	Eric Notarnicola; Tim Heidecker & Gregg Turkington (uncredited)	Tim Heidecker & Gregg Turkington	December 17, 2015
Writer/director Gregg Turkington weighs in on the aborted Decker Vs. Dracula! Also, find out what YOU can do to help!

=== Season 4: Unclassified (2016) ===
No. overall	No. in season	Title	Directed by	Written by	Original release date	Prod. code	US viewers (millions)
30	1	"All Good Things..."	Eric Notarnicola	Tim Heidecker & Gregg Turkington	June 17, 2016	401	1.28
Special Agent Jack Decker finds himself in a treacherous situation with no one but master codebreaker Jonathan Kington to help. Working together, they must stop a horrible evil and its sinister plans.
31	2	"The New Recruits"	Eric Notarnicola	Tim Heidecker & Gregg Turkington	June 24, 2016	402	1.190
Young recruit Jack Decker rallies against the pc-culture around him to save hundreds of innocent heroes.
32	3	"The Butterfly Effect"	Eric Notarnicola	Tim Heidecker & Gregg Turkington	July 8, 2016	403	1.135
Decker goes back in time to stop one of the largest attacks against America. Will he succeed, or will he alter the course of human history forever?
33	4	"Global Hoax"	Eric Notarnicola	Tim Heidecker & Gregg Turkington	July 15, 2016	404	0.938
With an energy crisis plaguing America, Jack Decker and Agent Kington discover a powerful organization at the root of it all. Guest Star: Al Jardine as Dr. Richards
34	5	"Band Together"	Eric Notarnicola	Tim Heidecker & Gregg Turkington	July 22, 2016	405	1.016
Supergroup "Dekkar" infiltrates the world's most powerful terrorist group. In the process, Decker learns the true meaning of friendship from one of his closest allies.
35	6	"A New Hero"	Eric Notarnicola	Tim Heidecker & Gregg Turkington	July 29, 2016	406	1.021
With nowhere to turn and danger looming, Agent Jonathan Kington finds a new champion of American freedom - now he just has to convince him to join the team.

=== Season 5: Unsealed (2017) ===
No. overall	No. in season	Title	Directed by	Written by	Original release date	Prod. code	US viewers (millions)
36	1	"Sonrise"	Eric Notarnicola	Tim Heidecker & Gregg Turkington	June 4, 2017	501	0.698
Decker Jr. and a resurrected Kington battle a ghastly male-genocide device initiated by Dracula.
37	2	"Promises Kept"	Eric Notarnicola	Tim Heidecker & Gregg Turkington	June 11, 2017	502	0.646
Decker's family vacation in Hawaii is interrupted by breaking news.
38	3	"Double Decker"	Eric Notarnicola	Tim Heidecker & Gregg Turkington	June 18, 2017	503	0.676
Framed for a crime he didn't commit, Decker has forty-eight hours to clear his name. Guest Stars: Alfonso Freeman as Old Franklin, Joey Travolta as Judge Buchanan and Denny Laine as Scrooge
39	4	"Private Sector"	Eric Notarnicola	Tim Heidecker & Gregg Turkington	June 25, 2017	504	0.680
While on the job for his famous security business, Decker becomes close with a top client. Guest Star: Kellee Maize as Popp
40	5	"Same Old Glory"	Eric Notarnicola	Tim Heidecker & Gregg Turkington	July 2, 2017	505	0.592
Decker Jr. and others learn the importance of the stars and stripes through the power of the movies. Guest Star: Steve Railsback as Fictional General Cotter
41	6	"A Grave Matter"	Eric Notarnicola	Tim Heidecker & Gregg Turkington	July 9, 2017	506	0.736
In the season finale, Decker Jr. and his friends visit his father's burial site. Meanwhile, a powerful enemy prepares for his revenge.

=== Season 6: Mindwipe (2017) ===
No. overall	No. in season	Title	Directed by	Written by	Original release date	Prod. code	US viewers (millions)
42	1	"Lesser of Two Evils"	Eric Notarnicola	Tim Heidecker & Gregg Turkington	July 16, 2017	601	0.638
In the season premiere, a traumatic experience leaves Decker in rough shape. Davidson recounts a time when Decker helped him win a presidential election.
43	2	"Trouble on the Bayou"	Eric Notarnicola	Tim Heidecker & Gregg Turkington	July 23, 2017	602	0.728
Decker is visited by his oldest friend, Lanoi, who tells the story of a much-needed vacation in New Orleans.
44	3	"DavidsonCare"	Eric Notarnicola	Tim Heidecker & Gregg Turkington	July 30, 2017	603	1.101
After a fellow veteran is murdered, Decker's search for the truth leads him to take on the healthcare system. Guest Star: Zac Holtzman as Dr. Luther An
45	4	"Desert Caravan"	Eric Notarnicola	Tim Heidecker & Gregg Turkington	August 6, 2017	604	0.861
Decker and Kington's trek through the desert turns into a bumpier ride than expected when Kington experiences health issues.
46	5	"Rock and a Hard Place"	Eric Notarnicola	Tim Heidecker & Gregg Turkington	August 13, 2017	605	1.042
Kington's dream cruise turns into a nightmare due to terrorism. Meanwhile, Decker discovers his other true calling: rock 'n roll. Guest Stars: David Marks and Carl Gottlieb as themselves
47	6	"Space Wall"	Eric Notarnicola	Tim Heidecker & Gregg Turkington	August 20, 2017	606	0.885
President Decker Jr. and his subordinate Kington go on an other worldly mission in the season finale. Guest Stars: Don Swayze as General Coover and Todd Rundgren as Ambassador Zultan (voice)

=== Special (2020) ===
Title	Directed by	Written by	Original release date
"The Animated Adventures of Jack Decker"	Chris Toms	Tim Heidecker & Gregg Turkington	July 3, 2020
Decker saves corn culture from a plot concocted by Dracula and Rumpelstilskin Guest: Bobby Valli as Rumpelstiltskin

=== Spin-off short film (2022) ===
Title	Directed by	Written by	Original release date
"Deck of Cards"	Eric Notarnicola	Tim Heidecker, Gregg Turkington & Eric Notarnicola	September 2, 2022
Reboot of the series for Hei Network Guest: Bobby Valli as Dr. Antonio Fanucci
"Deck of Cards: What Went Wrong?"	Eric Notarnicola	Tim Heidecker & Gregg Turkington	October 12, 2022
Retrospective on the making of the short film
