= Mister America =

2019 comedy film

- Theatrical release poster
- Directed by: Eric Notarnicola
- Screenplay by: Tim Heidecker; Eric Notarnicola; Gregg Turkington
- Based on: On Cinema by: Tim Heidecker; & Gregg Turkington
- Produced by: Andrew Porter; Tim Heidecker; Gregg Turkington; Eric Notarnicola; Eric Wareheim
- Starring: Tim Heidecker; Gregg Turkington
- Cinematography: Gabriel Patay
- Edited by: Sascha Stanton-Craven
- Production companies: Abso Lutely Productions; Williams Street
- Distributed by: Magnolia Pictures
- Release dates: October 4, 2019 (Beyond Fest); October 9, 2019 (United States)
- Running time: 89 minutes
- Country: United States
- Language: English
- Box office: $130,897

Mister America is a 2019 American mockumentary film directed by Eric Notarnicola and starring Tim Heidecker. Produced by Abso Lutely Productions, the film is a spin-off of their On Cinema web series for Adult Swim, in which Heidecker portrays a fictionalized version of himself who reviews films with fellow comedian Gregg Turkington; it follows Heidecker as he runs for the office of San Bernardino County district attorney, attempting to unseat the incumbent D.A. that previously attempted to imprison him on a mass murder charge. The film has received mixed reviews from critics.

== Plot ==
Tim Heidecker is the host of the web series On Cinema at the Cinema, where he and a cast of guests review films. After transitioning to being an electronic musician and hosting a music festival, he faces murder charges when 20 people overdose and die at the event and an additional 156 are hospitalized. He ends up beating the charge with a hung jury mistrial and sets out to become district attorney of San Bernardino County, despite not being an attorney or a resident of San Bernardino and to take revenge on Vincent Rosetti, the prosecutor of his case.

The film begins with a small crew following Heidecker going door to door to drum up enough signatures for him to be on the ballot as a third party candidate. He works with his campaign manager Toni Newman, who was also the sole juror to not find Heidecker guilty at his murder trial. The duo have an ad campaign made up of social media posts and yard signs mocking Rosetti as a rat and Heidecker briefly confronts him on camera before the D.A. drives away with no comment. Heidecker starts to crack under the pressure, excessively drinking and using the TCH vape system that previously addicted him and was responsible for killing the youth at his music festival.

Newman attempts to get press coverage that falls through at the last minute, fails to buy an ad in the local paper on time, and attempts to stage a debate where neither of Heidecker's opponents attend. Among the six crowd members is Heidecker's frequent guest host from On Cinema at the Cinema, Gregg Turkington. Turkington reaches out to the film crew to convince them to abandon the project and see Heidecker as a criminal and failure who has no passion for film. Heidecker has a meltdown and storms out of the event. Even though he and Newman forge several signatures, his name does not appear on the ballot and Rosetti is re-elected.

In a drug-induced haze, Heidecker calls Rosetti from the hotel room that doubles as his campaign headquarters and starts out gracefully conceding and offering congratulations before devolving into insults and threats. He passes out and the next day, he takes the crew to the condemned site of the music festival, where he creates a makeshift memorial to the youth who died.

== Cast ==
- Tim Heidecker as Tim Heidecker, host of On Cinema who runs for district attorney of San Bernardino County after narrowly avoiding being convicted of murder
- Terri Parks as Toni Newman, Heidecker's campaign manager and moral support
- Gregg Turkington as Gregg Turkington, a colleague of Heidecker, regular guest and resident film expert on On Cinema at the Cinema
- Curtis Webster as Judge Edward Szymczyk, judge at Heidecker's trial
- Don Pecchia as District Attorney Vincent Rosetti, lead prosecutor at Heidecker's trial
- Ndidi Amadi as Ndidi, a concerned citizen of San Bernardino
- Eric Notarnicola as Josh Lorton, the interviewer
- Manuel Giusti as Manuel, a friend of Tim contacted by phone
- Sarah "Squirm" Sherman as an angry woman confronting Tim
- Corey Landis as the newscaster voice

Mark Proksch, Jimmy McNichol and Joe Estevez also appear via archive footage

== Production and release ==
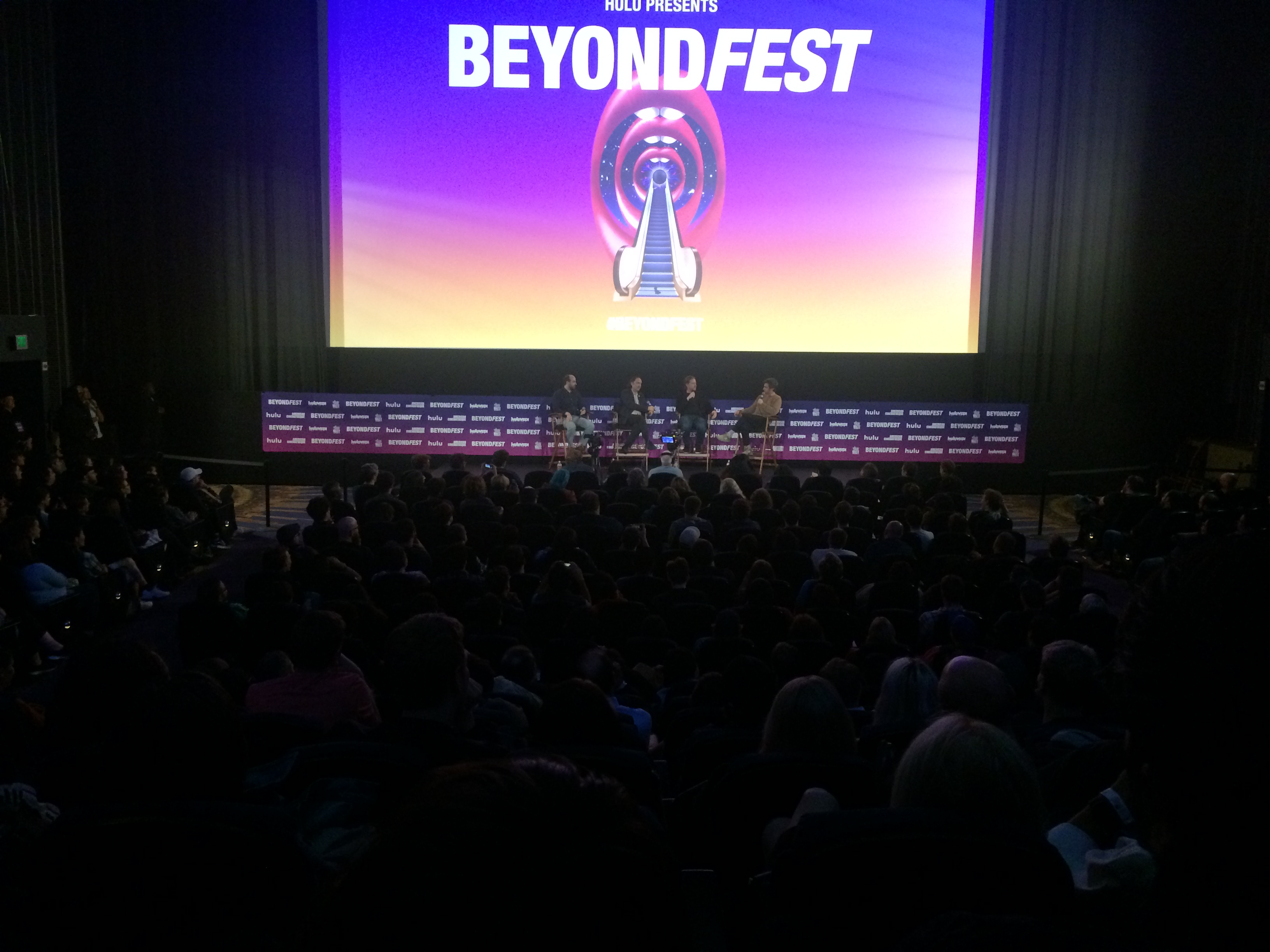
The panel at the film premiere of Mister America (from left to right): director Eric Notarnicola, cast member Gregg Turkington, star Tim Heidecker, and moderator Nathan Fielder

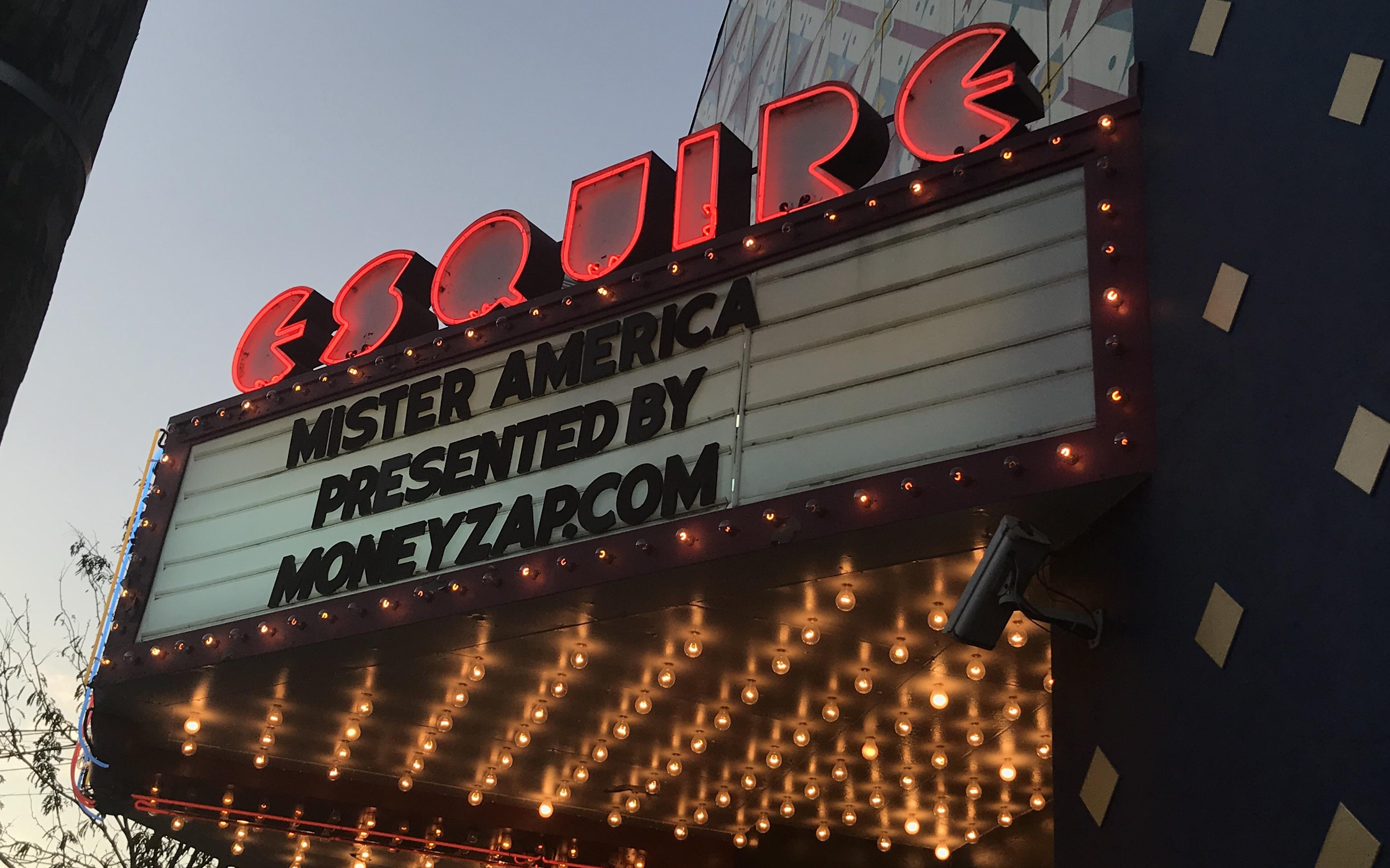
A film marquee for Mister America drawing on an On Cinema at the Cinema joke for the defunct loan website Moneyzap.com

The filmmakers preferred using non-actors to elicit genuine responses and the impression of a real documentary film and auditioned around 10 actresses for the part of Toni, on Gregg's recommendation. The acting was largely improvised from a minimal script and evolved from a prospective Web special into a full-length feature film spontaneously. While editing, the filmmakers looked for opportunities to include backstory in the documentary that would make it more accessible to viewers who were not familiar with the Web series. Interior filming was shot in the San Gabriel Valley.

The film's world premiere was as a part of Beyond Fest 2019 at Grauman's Egyptian Theatre, with comedian Nathan Fielder moderating the event. It was released in select theaters in the United States on October 9, 2019, by Magnolia Pictures. It is the third film with involvement from The Cartoon Network, Inc. to receive a full theatrical release, after The Powerpuff Girls Movie and Aqua Teen Hunger Force Colon Movie Film for Theaters. As with the latter, Williams Street was involved with production (Adult Swim distributed the web series) and Warner Bros. Pictures was not involved in distribution due to the former's box office failure.

In a January 31, 2021, question and answer showing, Heidecker and Notarnicola cited Street Fight, Mitt, Weiner, A Perfect Candidate, and Making a Murderer as inspirations.

== Reception ==
On the review aggregator website Rotten Tomatoes, 66% of 29 critics' reviews are positive, with an average rating of 6/10. The website's critical consensus reads, "Mister America misses a number of its targets, but fans of Tim Heidecker's unique brand of comedy will find moments worth savoring in this dry political satire." Metacritic, which uses a weighted average, assigned the film a score of 42 out of 100, based on 11 critics, indicating "mixed or average" reviews. In a positive review, David Weigel of The Washington Post wrote "Mister America is the devastating Trump satire America deserves." Writing for Variety, Peter Debruge gave the film a negative review, calling it "lazy" and writing that "nothing here feels like it took much effort", feeling disappointed by the high standard of quality that On Cinema at the Cinema set. Candice Frederick of TheWrap criticized the film for not being explicit enough in its political criticism: "Mister America merely underscores recognizable themes that are no less irritating in mockumentary form than they are in real life: White supremacy, miscarriages of justice and racial disenfranchisement in a community where the leaders have all but abandoned minority residents. But the film needs to say something about it rather than merely hold up a mirror to it."

In The New York Times, Ben Kenigsberg gave the film a mixed review, writing that it has "inspired moments throughout" but "face challenges of momentum", as "Tim's ignorance, insensitivity and ill-fitting tailoring aren't really good for 90 minutes of laughs". Ignatiy Vishnevetsky of The A.V. Club gave the film a C+, calling it a disappointment and summarizing, "In the end, it comes across as an inessential entry in a canon that has often bordered on genius". Writing for The Hollywood Reporter, Frank Scheck gave a very negative review, saying the film has "nary a single genuinely funny moment".

For The Week, both Andy Crump and Brendan Morrow gave positive assessments, with the former calling it, "unsettingly real", writing that the satire succeeds "too well, both for its own good and the good of the audience". Morrow called it one of 2019's best comedies, writing that it's "consistently funny" and a valuable expansion to the On Cinema at the Cinema universe. Scott Tobias of NPR also praised the film as a densely-insular series of in-jokes that may not be welcoming to new viewers but "will nonetheless survive as a fascinating artifact of the Trump era, when the rules of politics were revised to give boors and charlatans a pathway to power—even if, like Heidecker, it's only in their own minds."

On Cinema at the Cinema awarded the film only a collective 3 bags of popcorn with Tim Heidecker recommending that audiences "avoid it at all costs" and Gregg Turkington, in a rare 3 bag review, calling the film "definitely a very, very bad and very disappointing movie."

== See also ==
- 2018 California elections
- The Shaggy D.A., a film that Turkington repeatedly compares to Heidecker's campaign
