= Decker (TV series) =

- Genre: Action comedy
- Created by: Tim Heidecker; Gregg Turkington
- Based on: On Cinema at the Cinema by: Tim Heidecker; & Gregg Turkington
- Written by: Tim Heidecker; Gregg Turkington
- Directed by: Eric Notarnicola
- Starring: Tim Heidecker; Gregg Turkington; Joe Estevez; John Aprea; Sally Kellerman; Mark Proksch
- Country of origin: United States
- Original language: English
- No. of seasons: 6
- No. of episodes: 47 & 3 specials (episode list)

Production
- Running time: variable; currently ≈11 minutes
- Production companies: Abso Lutely Productions; Williams Street

Original release
- Network: YouTube / AdultSwim.com (2014–2015); Adult Swim (2016–2020)
- Release: July 17, 2014 – July 3, 2020

Related
- On Cinema

Decker is an American comedy web series and series created by Tim Heidecker and Gregg Turkington. The show is a web spinoff/tie-in to the series On Cinema at the Cinema and began on July 17, 2014. Many recurring jokes and the personas and mutual antipathies expressed by Decker and Turkington carry over from the relationship of the "real" actors, Heidecker and Turkington, in On Cinema.

The series is a spoof of action films, with intentionally bad production for comedic effect. It focuses on Special Agent Jack Decker (Heidecker), who attempts to stop terror attacks before they occur. At his side is Special Agent Kington (Turkington), with recurring appearances from many guests of the On Cinema series, such as Joe Estevez as President Davidson, and Mark Proksch as Abdul.

The series is part of the "On Cinema universe" which has a cult following, especially through social media. In response, Heidecker and Turkington started Decker-Con, where new episodes of Decker are screened and the cast appears as their "On Cinema" characters, meeting and talking to fans.

Initially an Adultswim.com series, it was announced to be moving to TV on December 17, 2015, and its fourth season premiered on June 17, 2016, on Adult Swim. The series was renewed for a fifth and sixth season, both of which aired in 2017.

== Premise ==
Decker follows the adventures of Jack Decker (Heidecker), a Jack Bauer-esque conservative CIA agent, in his attempts to defeat enemies including the Taliban, ISIS, Count Dracula, environmental science, and the inept, cowardly liberal President Jason Davidson (Joe Estevez). In his quest to save America, Decker is aided by the CIA's "master of codes", the movie-obsessed Jonathan Kington (Turkington), whose name is frequently mispronounced as either Kingston or Klington.

The series is a tie-in to On Cinema, acting as the passion project of the fictional version of Tim Heidecker. In the series, the production is extremely low quality, with CGI errors, notably overt political grandstanding, very low quality animations, misquotes and bad editing, all for comedic effect. The series is also party to overdrawn scenes, such as in season 2, where the main character sings "Our Values Are Under Attack," a partisan political song created by Heidecker. As the series progressed, more CGI was used, but used ineffectively, where sometimes effects would seem unfinished.

== Characters ==
=== Main characters ===
- Tim Heidecker as CIA Special Agent Jack Decker (Senior and Junior). Decker frequently rambles about his views on climate change or weak liberal politicians and in general spouts the political views of Heidecker's On Cinema persona. Many traits of the character are based on Donald Trump mannerisms.
- Joe Estevez as President Jason Davidson (Senior and Junior). A straw man caricature of a corrupt and meek liberal President, in the mold of Jimmy Carter. He is constantly insulted and criticized by Decker. Estevez's portrayal of the president is a play on his brother Martin Sheen's character of Josiah Bartlet on the drama series The West Wing.
- Gregg Turkington as Special Agent and master code-breaker Jonathan Kington (sometimes also referred to as Kingston, Klington, Klingston, Kilton and other variations). He is an avid movie buff who snacks on popcorn and has the largest film collection in the United States. During Season 2, Kington dubs VHS tapes to attempt a Guinness World Record of watching 500 movies in 500 days, which mirrors Gregg's On Cinema obsession. The ending of the sixth season reveals that Kington is a double agent working for hostile aliens.
- Sally Kellerman as First Lady Janet Rothman Davidson, the main antagonist of the fourth season. She is an obvious parody of Hillary Clinton, is under the control of Dracula, and is killed by Decker at the beginning of the fifth season.

=== Recurring characters ===
- James Mane Jr. as Lanoi Arnold, Decker's former CIA partner from Hawaii turned restaurateur and the main antagonist of the second season. He betrays Decker and works with the terrorists in exchange for money to pay off his debts and renovate his bar.
- John Aprea as General Jeffrey Cotter, the Chairman of the Joint Chiefs of Staff, who (in-universe) is written as a flat character with very few lines.
- Mark Proksch as Abdul Sharif, a Saudi Arabian terrorist who is the show's main antagonist and Decker's nemesis. Proksch also plays various other roles in the series such as characters from the Universal Monsters roster. A recurring joke carried over from On Cinema is that Proksch's many different roles require impersonation skills far beyond his in-universe persona's talent.
- Ralph Lucas as Dracula (credited as James Dean as part of an On Cinema storyline about Gregg finding James Dean alive who, in-universe, faked his own death, later voiced by Ruben Gomez in the animated series pilot). Dracula seeks to destroy the world with his diabolical creation: the Destructicon.
- Jimmy McNichol as the Son of Dracula and the main antagonist of Season 5. Intent on avenging his father's death at Decker's hands during the previous season.
- Charlie Schiefer as Vice President Roger Robertson. A background character during the first seasons who later reveals himself to be a double agent working for Dracula.
- Vaughn Armstrong as Dr. Peterson, a doctor that regularly treat Decker amnesia in the fifth season.
- Alessandro Serradimigni as Axiom, the guitarist of Decker's band, Dekkar. His character is no different from the on-universe Axiom.
- Manuel Giusti as Manuel, the second guitarist of Dekkar. Giusti also play another version of Jonathan Kington in another episode.
- Michael Matthews as Roy Saint Charlemagne Laroux, the owner of a leather shop in New Orleans. Matthews would later become a recurring guest in On Cinema proper and also voice Jeremy Coleman, another codebreaker character in the animated series spin-off.

== Series overview ==
Season	Title	Episodes	Originally released		
Season	Title	Episodes	First released	Last released	Network
1	Classified	5	July 17, 2014	August 14, 2014	YouTube/Adultswim.com
2	Port of Call: Hawaii	20	March 9, 2015	April 3, 2015	YouTube/Adultswim.com
3	Gregg Turkington's; Decker Vs. Dracula	4 (& 2 specials)	October 12, 2015	December 2, 2015	YouTube/Adultswim.com
4	Unclassified	6	June 17, 2016	July 29, 2016	Adult Swim
5	Unsealed	6	June 4, 2017	July 9, 2017	Adult Swim
6	Mindwipe	6	July 16, 2017	August 20, 2017	Adult Swim
7	The Animated Adventures of Jack Decker	1 pilot	July 3, 2020		Adult Swim
8	Deck of Cards	1 short film (& 1 special)	September 2, 2022	October 12, 2022	HEI Network

== Production ==
Heidecker has said of production that there is, to an extent, purposefully little preparation in the process to make the show appear as low-quality as possible, as well as stating: "We'll also go off-script and rant a bit to get everyone confused."
