= Mark Proksch =

American actor and comedian

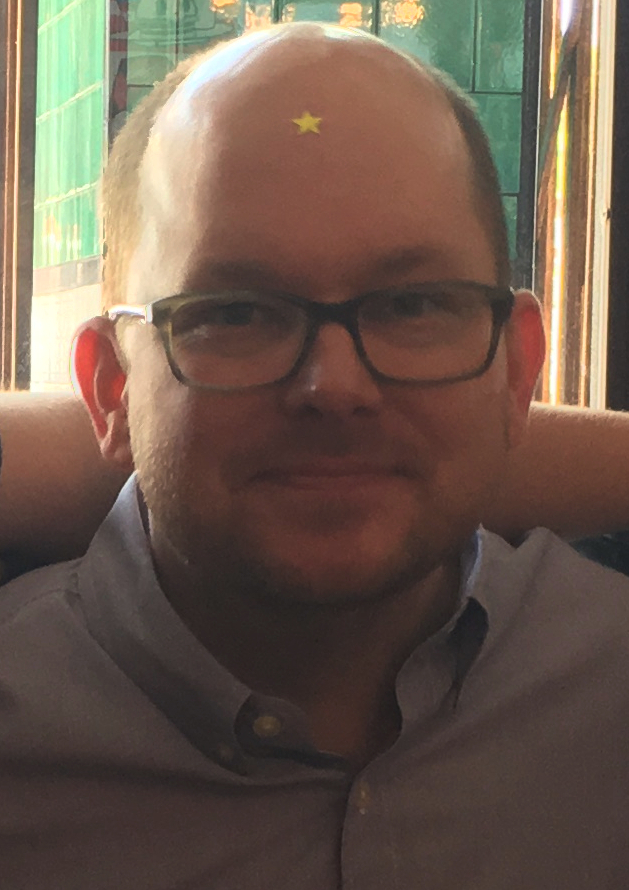
- Proksch in 2016
- Born: 1978 or 1979 (age 47–48)
- Education: University of Wisconsin–Eau Claire
- Occupations: Actor; comedian
- Years active: 2007–present
- Spouse: Amelie Gillette

Mark Proksch (/ˈprʊkʃ/ PRUUKSH; born 1978 or 1979) is an American comedian and character actor. He is best known for acting in the television series The Office, Better Call Saul, Dream Corp LLC, What We Do in the Shadows and as a fictionalized version of himself in the On Cinema universe.

He rose to prominence when he portrayed the character "K-Strass", a parody of a yo-yo master, who appeared on local news shows.

== Early life ==
Proksch grew up in Onalaska, Wisconsin, and is a graduate of Onalaska High School and the University of Wisconsin–Eau Claire.

== K-Strass ==
Proksch had the alias Kenny "K-Strass" Strasser early in his career, during which he appeared on small-market local newscasts as a hapless "yo-yo master." In these appearances, he fabricated stories about visiting schools to speak to children about environmentalism. When asked to perform tricks live on the air, he would display a complete inability to do any of them. The character of K-Strass was described by online magazine Paste as "the funniest thing that's ever happened" and speaking "in a nasal Midwestern accent, with a halting cadence that was both awkward and deliberate." K-Strass was created when Proksch's temp job at an ad agency fell through.

Proksch also appeared as K-Strass while opening for Gregg Turkington's Neil Hamburger on tour. Turkington and Proksch would work together again on On Cinema.

== Television career ==
Proksch had a recurring role on the television series The Office as Nate, Dwight Schrute's lackey and the office handyman. He appeared in 19 episodes over the show's final three seasons. In March 2013, Proksch starred in the NBC television pilot Holding Patterns. He also voiced the character Johnnie in the Adventure Time episode "Bad Timing." In March 2014, Proksch appeared in an episode of Portlandia as Carrie Brownstein's love interest. From 2015 to 2017 he appeared as Daniel "Pryce" Wormald, a recurring character on the AMC drama series Better Call Saul, a prequel to Breaking Bad. From 2014 through 2020, Proksch appeared as the character "Randy Blink" in the Adult Swim series Dream Corp LLC. In 2015, Proksch appeared in Season 3, Episode 1 of Drunk History in which he told the story of the Bone Wars.

=== On Cinema at the Cinema ===
Proksch plays a fictionalized version of himself in the On Cinema universe, in which he attempts various impersonations, including W.C. Fields and The Marx Brothers, where his last name is frequently mispronounced.

The fictional Proksch was briefly declared dead during the 5th Annual On Cinema Oscar special, having suffocated inside a heavy diving suit during a Jaws impersonation skit. His character briefly appears in season 10's VR episodes, when the camera is turned showing his comatose body. This takes place during a recurring section in which Gregg Turkington plays his old audition tapes for films he failed to be cast in. His comatose body again appears in the 6th Annual Oscar special as "The Living Oscar". Painted gold and strapped to a gurney, pre-recorded phrases in his voice are played in answer to questions surrounding Oscar trivia. During one segment his comatose body is slowly rotated around a compilation of past Oscar nominated films. He awakens after being knocked over by host Tim Heidecker and spends the rest of the special in a state of confusion and shock while bleeding from a broken nose. The fictional Proksch still appeared confused in the next season of On Cinema. After being beaten in a Los Angeles Police Department holding cell when he was wrongly arrested for selling VHS copies of public domain movies with Gregg, he goes missing. During the 8th Annual Oscar special, a brief video recording that appears to depict the fictional Proksch surfaces and suggests that he no longer wishes to be involved with the hosts of On Cinema. He later returns to co-star as The Mummy and other characters, in Deck of Cards.

As of the 12th Annual Oscar special, he remains involved with the hosts of On Cinema, despite constant abuse.

=== What We Do in the Shadows ===
Proksch stars as Colin Robinson, an energy vampire, in the FX series What We Do in the Shadows, as well as portraying the reincarnation of Colin Robinson as a child and teenager (nicknamed "The Boy") following the original Colin's death in the third season finale.

== Personal life ==
Proksch is married to writer Amelie Gillette.

== Filmography ==
=== Film ===
Year	Title	Role	Notes
2014	Hamlet A.D.D.	N/A	Uncredited
2014	A Merry Friggin' Christmas	Trooper Zblocki	
2016	Another Evil	Os Bijourn	
2016	Asperger's Are Us	Himself/K-Strass	Documentary
2019	Her Mind in Pieces	Jeffrey Presch	
2019	VHYes	Teddy	
2019	Mister America	Mark Proksch	Archive footage
2024	Perfect 10	Kevin	Short film
2025	The Twits	Horvis Dungle (voice)	

=== Television ===
Year	Title	Role	Notes
2010–2013	The Office	Nate Nickerson	19 episodes
2012, 2014	Infomercials	Kenny/Kirk Peckley	Episode:"Smart Pipe" & "Swords, Knives, Very Sharp Objects, and Cutlery"
2013, 2025	Bob's Burgers	Mr. Dinkler/Dean	2 episodes
2013	Animal Practice	Gary	Episode: "Wingmen"
2013	Hello Ladies	Father	Episode: "The Wedding"
2013	New Girl	Dan	Episode: "Nerd"
2013	Comedy Bang! Bang!	Alternate Reality Man	Episode: " Andy Dick Wears a Black Suit Jacket & Skinny Tie"
2013	Eagleheart	Craig Balmer	Episode: "Bowsley"
2014–2017	Decker	Abdul Shariff/Mark Proksch/Frankenstein/Wolfman/WC-3P0	20 episodes
2014–2020	Dream Corp LLC	Randy Blink	30 episodes, 1 pilot short
2014	Adventure Time	Johnnie	Episode: "Bad Timing"
2014	Portlandia	Sean	Episode: "Pull-Out King"
2014	Modern Family	Coleman	Episode: "Message Received"
2014	Marry Me	Chad	Episode: "Move Me"
2014	Selfie	Waiter	Episode: "Follow Through"
2015	Drunk History	Narrator	Episode: "New Jersey"
2015–2017	Better Call Saul	Daniel "Pryce" Wormald	4 episodes
2016–2017	Son of Zorn	Todd	9 episodes
2017	Comrade Detective	Stefan/American Guard/Embassy Officer	3 episodes
2017	Apollo Gauntlet	Monty	5 episodes
2017	Tarantula	Voice	Episode: "The Shade"
2018	This Is Us	Mel Buchanan	Episode: "The Car"
2018	Fresh Off The Boat	Chad	Episode: "Let Me Go, Bro"
2018	A.P. Bio	Philip	Episode: "Teacher Jail"
2018	Room 104	Gene	Episode: "Hungry"
2019	Corporate	Mark	Episode: "The Fall"
2019–2024	What We Do in the Shadows	Colin Robinson	Main Cast, 50 episodes
2020	Black Monday	Lou 'Jewdini' Dinowitz	Episode: "Idiot Inside"
2021	Q-Force	Additional voices	2 episodes
2021	Ten Year Old Tom	Dakota's Dad	3 episodes
2022	Fairfax	Terry	2 episodes
2022	Central Park	Lester Posey/Nico	2 episodes
2022	Paradise PD	Norf	4 episodes
2022–2025	The Great North	Roy	7 episodes
2023	HouseBroken	Amigo	Episode: "Who's the Cat-Chelorette"
2024	Exploding Kittens	Marv Higgins	9 episodes
2024	The Simpsons	Hack-GPT	Episode: "Bart's Birthday"
2026	The 'Burbs	Tod Mann	Main Cast
2026	The Terrors of Jordan Mendoza	Mark Thompson	Episode: "I Gotta Relax."

=== Web series ===
Year	Title	Role	Episode
2014–present	On Cinema	Mark Proksch	21 episodes, 7 special

=== Music videos ===
Year	Title	Artist	Role
2023	Bubblegum Dog	MGMT	Cameo
2023	Round the Bend	The Tubs	Taxi driver

== Nominations ==
Year	Award	Category	Nominated work	Result	Ref.
2021	Critics' Choice Television Awards	Best Supporting Actor in a Comedy Series	What We Do in the Shadows	Nominated	
