= On Cinema =

American comedy web series

- Also known as: On Cinema at the Cinema (seasons 1–12); OCX (season 10); On Cinema and More in the Morning (season 13); On Cinema on Demand (season 14); On Cinema at the Cinema from Movie House (season 15); On Cinema at the Cinema at the ESA (season 16); "On Cinema at the Cinema at The Manor"(season 16); "The Road to Phoenix"(season 16.5); "New's Movie Lounge"(season 17)
- Genre: Satire; Metafiction; Black comedy; Anti-comedy; Cringe comedy
- Created by: Tim Heidecker; Gregg Turkington
- Written by: Tim Heidecker; Gregg Turkington; Eric Notarnicola
- Directed by: Benjamin Berman (seasons 1–2); Eric Notarnicola (seasons 3–11, 13-14); Vera Drew (season 12)
- Starring: Tim Heidecker; Gregg Turkington; Mark Proksch; Joe Estevez
- Opening theme: "Enjoy The Show" by Joseph M. Saba and Stewart J. Winter (Seasons 1-12, 15) "The Knockout" by Janos Fulop, Adam Brostoff, and Darin MacEachern (Season 14)
- Country of origin: United States
- No. of seasons: 16 web seasons 1 podcast season 1 limited event (video series)
- No. of episodes: 47 & 14 specials (podcast); 156 & 26 specials (video series) (episode list)

Production
- Production company: Abso Lutely Productions

Original release
- Network: Podcast: Independent; Video series: Thing X (2012–13); adultswim.com (2013–2020); HEI Network (2021–present)
- Release: 2011 – 2013
- Release: 2012 – present

Related
- Decker; Mister America

On Cinema at the Cinema (or just On Cinema) is an American comedy web series and podcast starring Tim Heidecker and Gregg Turkington as amateur film critics. The duo appear as fictionalized versions of themselves. The show started as an independently released podcast from 2011 to 2013, before being picked up as a professionally produced web video series by Thing X in 2012, continuing after the site merged with Adult Swim's website in 2013. The show moved to HEI Network in 2021, an independent service with funding from user subscriptions and special event ticket purchases.

On Cinema at the Cinema is the hub of a metafictional universe which includes the original podcast, 16 seasons of the web video series, yearly live Oscar specials, a spin-off limited series entitled "The Trial", the spin-off series Decker, a movie review app, an On Cinema Live! tour, and a film entitled Mister America.

On Cinema also features guest actors, some of whom play fictionalized versions of themselves, most notably actors Joe Estevez and Mark Proksch. The show and fictional universe have a dedicated cult following of fans who play along with the storylines via social media, often by taking sides in Tim and Gregg's frequent arguments by self-identifying as "Timheads" or "Greggheads". Heidecker and Turkington also started Decker-Con, where they appear in character and interact with fans.

== Premise ==
Tim and Gregg "review" films without actually providing any meaningful information or critical insight. Beginning with the video series, they each give a rating from one to five "bags of popcorn". Almost every film gets a score of "5 bags" or higher from both reviewers. Many episodes also include special segments, usually from Gregg.

Episodes of On Cinema are often interrupted by petty arguments. Tim tends to derail the show with issues from his personal life, especially his problematic romantic entanglements and bizarre medical problems, much to the chagrin of Gregg, who prefers to focus on the movies. Gregg produces low-quality segments like "On Cinema On Location" which provoke anger and harsh criticism from Tim.

== Major characters ==
=== Tim Heidecker ===
Played by Tim Heidecker as a fictionalized version of himself, Tim is the creator and host of On Cinema. He appears to know very little about the films he is discussing, and in some episodes has clearly not bothered watching them, although he is a fan of Tom Cruise and Jack Reacher. Tim often uses his show to discuss his conservative views, his personal problems, and to promote his other projects, like his action series Decker, his band Dekkar, and his company HEI Inc.

Tim is an aggressive and egomaniacal alcoholic; he tends to drink heavily during the Oscar specials and begin ranting and berating his costars. He has an estranged teenage son from his first marriage, which ended after he underwent brain surgery against the wishes of his wife. He then married Ayaka, a foreign exchange student, and the two had a son, Tom Cruise Jr. Heidecker. Tom Cruise Jr. died after Tim refused to have him vaccinated, and the marriage soon ended. Tim then became involved with Toni Newman, his aide during his campaign for San Bernardino district attorney. They married twice, but following an affair and a trip to rehab, a newly sober Toni divorced Tim. Later, after Toni’s son Matt was shot and killed, they reconciled and married again. While attempting to get the marriage license certified, Tim accidentally changed his name to "Newman Heidecker". After being adopted by G. Amato, he changes his name to "New Amato".

=== Gregg Turkington ===
Played by Gregg Turkington as a fictionalized version of himself, Gregg acts as the cohost of On Cinema and appears in nearly every episode, although Tim almost always refers to him as a "guest". Gregg is a self-described film buff and movie expert, although his knowledge mostly consists of dull and obscure trivia. He is generally naive and ignorant about the movie industry; for example, he regularly predicted that the Hobbit movies would win Best Picture despite never being nominated, believing that the Academy has a "write-in section". Gregg is generally annoyed by Tim's distracting antics and believes that On Cinema should be devoted exclusively to "the movies".

Gregg has an extensive collection of VHS cassettes located in Victorville, California, which he refers to as the Victorville Film Archive. He frequently claims that it is one of the largest film archives in North America, though its exact size is unknown and Tim has destroyed it on multiple occasions. Gregg produces many of the show's recurring segments, including "Popcorn Classics", in which he showcases a VHS tape from his collection, and "On Cinema On Location", where he visits Hollywood "landmarks" (usually minor shooting locations from forgotten movies). Gregg also plays Special Agent Jonathan Kington on Decker. Gregg has contempt for and is visually annoyed with Tim's antics, openly antagonizing Tim when speaking on a topic not related to the films they're reviewing, often Tim's right-wing conspiracy theories or hypocrisy. He returns to On Cinema despite this, hoping to keep Tim focused on the movies and to be made an official co-host of the show.

== Recurring characters ==
- Joe Estevez (as himself): Joe is an actor, a frequent guest on On Cinema and a friend of both Tim and Gregg. He is friendly and forbearing and often supports the show's side projects. He portrays President Davidson/President Davidson Jr. on Decker and as the King of hearts in Deck of Cards (2019).
- Mark Proksch (as himself): Mark is a celebrity impersonator who was originally hired by Tim and Gregg for the second Oscar special. He specializes in impersonating classic comedians like W.C. Fields and the Three Stooges. He uses a very similar voice in all of his "impressions", which consist of Mark in amateurish costumes flatly reciting biographic information about the subject, often including the date of their death. Tim and Gregg often use him for various odd jobs, and he is the frequent object of verbal and physical abuse, especially from Tim. He played various minor characters in Decker. After falling into a coma, he was taken under the wing of Turkington, who allegedly spent the money for Proksch's medical care on VHS tapes. He was awoken during The New On Cinema Oscar Special by Tim.
- Ayaka Ohtani (portrayed by Ayaka Ohwaki): Ayaka was a foreign exchange student who stayed with Tim's family. She had a brief relationship with Tim before she was deported back to Japan, where she gave birth to their son, Tom Cruise, named after his favorite actor. She briefly returned to live with Tim and their son at Gregg's apartment, forcing Gregg to live in a storage unit. After their son's death, Ayaka moved back to Japan. She returned to testify at Tim's trial, stating she'd remarried and started a family in Japan, much to Tim's dismay.
- Dr. San (portrayed by Zac Holtzman): Luther Sanchez, more commonly referred to as "Dr. San", was a con-man and practitioner of alternative medicine, serving first as Tim's acupuncturist and later as his family physician after Tom Cruise Jr. was born. Dr. San tricked Tim out of large sums of money for dangerous medical treatments, convinced him not to vaccinate his child, and provided him with toxic vape pens that poisoned him and killed 19 people at Tim's music festival. He was arrested along with Tim and committed suicide while in custody.
- Tom Cruise Jr. Heidecker: Tim and Ayaka's son, named by Ayaka after Tim's favorite actor Tom Cruise. He died of an unknown illness as an infant, likely due to Dr San's poor medical treatments.
- Alessandro "Axiom" Serradimigni (as himself): Axiom is an Italian guitar player who became the second member of Dekkar after meeting Tim at Guitar Center. Axiom is very loyal to Tim and even donated his hand after Tim lost his. He has a sister, Julianna, who Tim was briefly married to. Axiom had an affair with Toni allegedly under the influence of alcohol, which ultimately resulted in the end of her marriage.
- Manuel Giusti (as himself): Manuel is the third member of Dekkar and a friend of Axiom. Overwhelmingly loyal to Tim, Manuel donates skin from his buttocks to repair Tim's burned face and perjured himself at Tim's trial by presenting a falsified suicide note that Tim wrote and had Manuel claim came from Dr. San.
- Toni Newman (portrayed by Terri Parks): Toni first appeared in Mister America as manager for Tim's district attorney campaign. Toni is more competent than Tim, but is equally disorganized and doesn't hesitate to employ illegal means to achieve her ends. Tim and Toni have married multiple times and she struggled with alcohol abuse. Toni is no longer married to Tim after the death of Matt
- Matt Newman (portrayed by Tobias Icasatti): Matt was Toni's son from a previous marriage. He is lazy and seemingly only interested in playing video games. Matt didn't show much love for Tim when he was married to Toni. Matt was shot and killed during a botched home invasion during the events of season 14.
- Michael "LaRue" Matthews: LaRue originally appeared as a bit actor from Decker, and was later hired by Tim as his bodyguard and private detective. Michael is a right-wing militant who believes in various right-wing conspiracies theories typically found on the Internet and is regularly sent by Tim on errands to stalk and obtain personal information on his supposed enemies. He's also a gun enthusiast, the host of Xposed on the HEI Network, and an amateur rapper that performed with Tim's band DEK4R. Since Gregg ran him over during the eighth Oscar special, LaRue uses an electric mobility aid vehicle. He has exposed Joe for having an affair with Toni at Sizzler, and Gregg for working at AMC Theatres, rather than the AMC Network.
- Hank Friedmann: Hank is a restaurateur who has catered for several of the Oscar specials over the years, usually serving chili. Hank originally worked for a restaurant called "Chaplin's Chili", but the restaurant later underwent a series of complex rebrandings which Hank was forced to try to explain during the Oscar specials. Hanks father, Tom Chaplain, founder of "Chaplins Chili", was killed during the seventh annual Oscar Special due to Carbon monoxide poisoning because of Gregg's vehicle running.
- John Aprea (as himself): An actor best known for appearing on The Godfather Part II, John first appears on the first Oscar special and later serves as a guest host of On Cinema. He also appears on Decker as General Jeffrey Cotter. John tends to maintain a professional composure lacked by many of the other characters.
- "James Dean" (portrayed by Ralph Lucas): An old man who Gregg claims is the real James Dean, who faked his death in 1955. Gregg brought him out as a guest in the third Oscar special. Tim refused to believe Gregg's claims, but a DNA test performed by Dr. San seemingly confirmed he was in fact James Dean. He plays Count Dracula on Decker.
- Wendy Kerby (portrayed by Jessica Ruth Bell): Wendy is a singer who frequents Tim's and Toni's church and first appeared in the eighth Oscar special. She joins Tim's band, D4, replacing Axiom. She appears as co-host in the Wendy Kerby Valentines Day Special, but after an awkward attempt by Tim to stage a kiss between her and Manuel, she runs off set and doesn't return.
- Gabriel "G." Amato (portrayed by Carlos Barbouth): G. Amato was a mysterious investor and owner of The Amato Group, which funded production of On Cinema season 13 and 14. He unofficially adopts Tim as a son in the tenth Oscar special. Later, Amato steps down from his role at the company and is placed in a retirement home. Amato dies in season 16, after eating a long-expired can of soup from the 1950s used as a movie prop in the Ma and Pa Kettle franchise. This was due to his belief that canned food lasts "until infinity"
- Kaili Amato (portrayed by Marie Gibeault): Kaili is the daughter-in-law of G. Amato. In On Cinema season 13, she co-hosts, and provides updates on Hollywood gossip in season 13 and 14. She is a widow, after her husband Chris Amato was killed in a carjacking. In On Cinema season 14, Gregg develops an unrequited attraction towards her, due to their common like of the Harry Potter film series culminating in a failed Marriage proposal.
- Joey Patrocelli (portrayed by Eddie Alfano): Joey is an employee of The Amato Group and co-host of On Cinema on Demand during season 14. Joey is an athletic, composed, and well spoken man with a fondness for mafia movies. He often comes into conflict with Gregg over his pre-recorded segment, "Joey's Take," and his use of a four star rating system, as opposed to Gregg's five bags. He ends AmatoCon by assaulting Tim and Gregg, resulting in Gregg getting a settlement from The Amato Group. Tim believes Joey is responsible for Matt's death.

== Series overview ==
Season	Episodes	Originally released	
Season	Episodes	First released	Last released
Podcast	47 (& 14 specials)	September 20, 2011	April 22, 2013
1	10 (& 1 special)	December 2, 2012	January 17, 2013
2	10 (& 4 specials)	February 7, 2013	April 25, 2013
3	10 (& 1 special)	July 7, 2013	December 18, 2013
4	10 (& 1 special)	January 8, 2014	March 12, 2014
5	10	July 2, 2014	September 3, 2014
6	10 (& 1 special)	February 4, 2015	April 8, 2015
7	10 (& 1 special)	September 9, 2015	November 11, 2015
8	10 (& 1 special)	March 2, 2016	November 11, 2016
9	10 (& 1 special)	February 26, 2017	May 15, 2017
The Trial	6	November 15, 2017	November 28, 2017
10	10 (& 2 specials)	January 16, 2018	May 25, 2018
11	10 (& 2 specials)	January 25, 2019	November 27, 2019
12	10 (& 5 specials)	December 19, 2019	February 14, 2022
13	10 (& 3 specials)	March 22, 2022	January 4, 2023
14	10 (& 2 specials)	March 12, 2023	March 10, 2024
15	10 (& 2 specials)	December 25, 2024	June 18, 2025
16	9 (& 2 specials)	October 1, 2025	March 15, 2026

=== Podcast ===
The On Cinema podcast was produced independently by Heidecker and Gregg. The podcast consists of Heidecker, along with Gregg as a "special guest" for almost every episode, covering movies poorly and with little insight, and often engaging in arguments. Gregg later developed a more pretentious "film buff" persona, and Tim took a turn to being obnoxiously political, sometimes devoting entire episodes to conspiracy theories, much to the chagrin of Gregg.

== Production ==
Heidecker has stated that On Cinema was started out of a desire to mock the podcasting community. The first episode was recorded on the set of The Comedy, where Heidecker and Turkington were working together, after Heidecker proposed the idea between takes. In April 2017, On Cinema initiated a Patreon page for funding, most of it going to the Oscar specials, with some of the higher options including receiving producer credits, walk-on roles for the Oscar specials, or live custom Skype reviews from Gregg Turkington.

In 2013, the On Cinema Film Guide app was released, featuring the voices of Turkington and Heidecker reviewing over 17,000 films.

The series moved premieres to Adult Swim's online live streams in 2017, with the series continuing to be posted on YouTube on a delay. The Adult Swim streams later picked up a fan-show series, Big Unhappy Family, in 2019, as a companion to season 11 and Mister America. However, in late 2020, following the COVID-19 pandemic and layoffs that shuttered the Adult Swim streams, it was announced that the show would move from Adult Swim's platforms to HEI Network, an independent streaming service created for the series.

== Reception ==
The show has a dedicated cult following of fans who interact with the storylines via social media, often taking sides as "GreggHeads" or "TimHeads" in the frequent personal conflicts between the hosts which are often only tangentially, if at all, related to films or cinema. During the annual live Oscar special, Tim and Gregg both frequently provide interactive elements via online polls for fans to vote on. This cult following is especially found on YouTube, Facebook, and Twitter, the latter through Gregg and Tim's respective profiles, of which Gregg has completely devoted to the persona of his alter-ego. Heidecker and Turkington have also appeared in character on the podcasts Kreative Kontrol with Vish Khanna and The Best Show in 2015 and 2017.

Heidecker and Turkington also started Decker-Con, where new episodes of Decker are shown to fans and the cast appears as their On Cinema characters to field questions.

For "The Trial", Heidecker and Turkington upended the traditional review aspect of the series, and staged a mock event where Tim's character was on trial for murder, which lasted over a week. It received acclaim from observers, some of whom called it "brilliant" and "ambitious."

== Touring ==
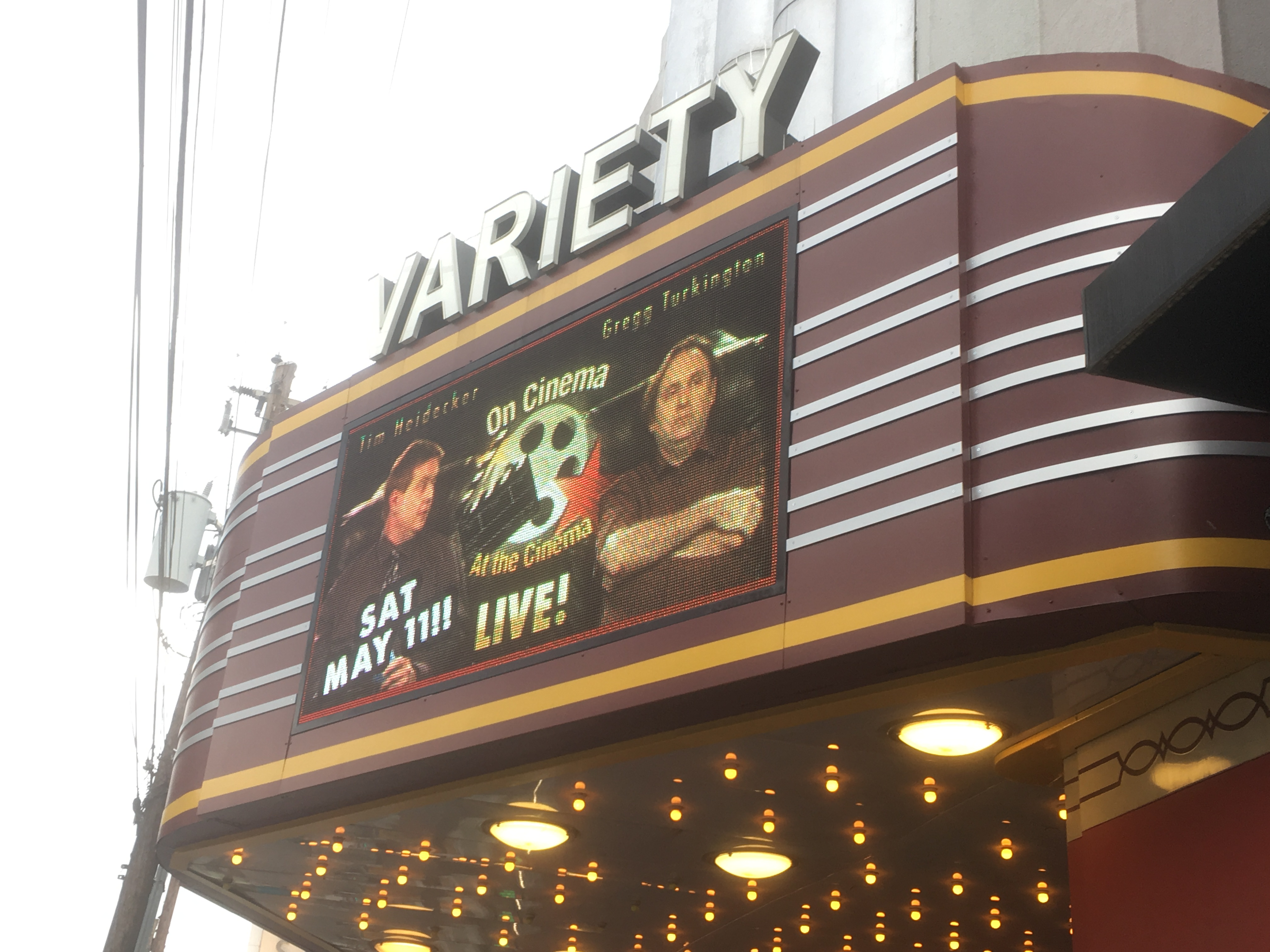
Marquee for the live show in Atlanta, GA

In 2018 and 2019, Heidecker and Turkington initiated a nationwide On Cinema Live! tour with special guests from the On Cinema/Decker universe such as Joe Estevez and John C. Reilly, the band Dekkar and special content created only for the tour, such as live reviewing various major release films, including Superfly, Mission: Impossible – Fallout, Jurassic World: Fallen Kingdom, Sicario: Day of the Soldado, Ant Man & The Wasp. In 2026, Heidecker and Turkington again toured On Cinema Live! nationwide, starting March 21 in Chicago and making stops in Toronto, Atlanta, Philadelphia, Boston, New York, Seattle, San Francisco, and other cities. The tour ended in Los Angeles on April 17.
