= Son of the Bronx =

- Available in: English
- Owner: Douglas Pucci
- Creator: Douglas Pucci
- Website: sonofthebronx.blogspot.com
- Launched: 2011
- Current status: Defunct

Son of the Bronx was a website that compiled Nielsen ratings data for cable channels in the United States. Founded by former VH1 intern Douglas Pucci (nickname "Son of the Bronx") on the Blogger service, it specialized in publishing detailed listings of ratings for various major cable channels, as well as multiple sports television networks. From its inception in 2011, the site was referenced by numerous sources, using its data for selected cable ratings reports and comparisons of top-performing programs by websites such as TV by the Numbers and The Futon Critic. The site shut down on May 22, 2014, following reports of copyright infringement.

== History ==
Sample table from a post on the site; all posts cite Nielsen Media Research for ratings data.

Son of the Bronx was founded by former VH1 intern Douglas Pucci, whose nickname gave the site its name. From 2011, Pucci published Nielsen ratings data for major cable channels such as Cartoon Network, Nickelodeon, and the Hub Network, as well as multiple sports television networks. Many of the site's ratings, specifically those for Adult Swim and the Hub Network, were later republished on the television news site TV Media Insights, of which Pucci is a contributor. On May 22, 2014, Pucci announced that the site had been site shut down following copyright infringement reports.

== Impact ==
From its inception, the site was referenced by numerous sources. Robert Seidman and Bill Gorman, founders of TV by the Numbers, attributed Pucci for use of his data in their selected cable rating reports, comparisons of top-performing programs, final-day broadcast ratings and time-period breakdowns, (Note: TV by the Numbers defines the former term for Friday-broadcast ratings published the following Monday and Sunday-broadcast ratings posed the following Tuesday.) among others. The Futon Critic, a similar website, also republished Pucci's data for its select cable ratings reports.

Elsewhere, Son of the Bronx was cited in articles regarding sports television networks by sources such as the Dayton Daily News, Scripps Howard News Service (via the Associated Press), Soccer America, Yahoo! Sports and Yardbarker.
