= Eric Notarnicola =

American screenwriter (born 1987)

- Born: April 5, 1987 (age 39); Raleigh, North Carolina, U.S.
- Education: The University of North Carolina at Chapel Hill (BA)
- Occupations: Screenwriter, director, producer
- Years active: 2009–present
- Notable work: Nathan for You; Mister America; On Cinema; Who Is America?; The Rehearsal

Eric Notarnicola (born April 5, 1987) is an American screenwriter, director, producer, and musician. He is best known for his work in comedy that intersects reality.

== Career ==
Notarnicola began his career working as a television editor and visual effects artist, frequently collaborating with comedy duo Tim and Eric before moving into writing, directing, and producing.

He has written for television shows such as Nathan for You, Tim and Eric Awesome Show, Great Job!, Decker, Who Is America?, and The Eric Andre Show.

He has directed music videos for Jenny Lewis, Sasami, Anamanaguchi, and The Spinto Band.

In 2020 he directed Eric Andre's first standup special, Legalize Everything, for Netflix.

In 2019 he directed and co-wrote the comedy feature film Mister America, starring Tim Heidecker, released by Magnolia Pictures.

Notarnicola serves as writer and executive producer of The Rehearsal on HBO, which received an Independent Spirit Award for Best New Non-Scripted or Documentary Series.

=== On Cinema ===
Since 2013, Notarnicola has been involved in a long-running collaboration with Tim Heidecker and Gregg Turkington on their genre and medium-bending On Cinema comedy series, serving as a writer, director, and producer on nearly all of the associated projects.

In 2016, Notarnicola's web series Decker with Heidecker and Turkington was adapted for television which aired for three seasons on Adult Swim, with Notarnicola serving as director and co-executive producer.

=== Music ===
Alongside Tim Heidecker, Notarnicola writes and records the music for the fictional rock band Dekkar in the On Cinema universe.

He plays bass in the indie rock band Annuals.

== Filmography ==
=== Film ===
Year	Title	Director	Writer	Producer	Notes
2019	Mister America	Yes	Yes	Yes	
2020	Borat Subsequent Moviefilm	No	Yes	No	Consultant Writer
2026	You Can See Everything	No	No	Yes	Co-Producer

=== Television ===
Year	Title	Director	Writer	Producer	Editor	Notes
2013–2014	Eagleheart	No	No	Yes	Yes	20 episodes
2014	Tim & Eric's Bedtime Stories	No	Yes	No	Yes	Consultant writer, 7 episodes
2014–2017	Decker	Yes	Yes	Yes	No	49 episodes
2015–2017	Nathan for You	No	Yes	Yes	Yes	16 episodes
2017	Tim and Eric Awesome Show, Great Job! 10 Year Anniversary Version, Great Job?	No	Yes	No	Yes	TV special
2018	Who Is America?	No	Yes	No	Yes	7 episodes
2019	"KRFT Punk's Political Party!"	Yes	No	Yes	No	TV special
2020	Eric Andre: Legalize Everything	Yes	No	No	No	TV special
2020	The Eric Andre Show	No	Yes	No	No	Consultant writer, 10 episodes
2023	Paul T. Goldman	No	No	Yes	No	Consulting producer, 6 episodes
2022–present	The Rehearsal	No	Yes	Yes	No	12 episodes

== Awards and nominations ==
Year	Association	Category	Project	Result	Ref.
2016	Writers Guild of America Award	Comedy / Variety Series	Nathan for You	Nominated	
2017	Writers Guild of America Award	Comedy / Variety Special	Nathan for You: A Celebration	Nominated	
2017	Writers Guild of America Award	Comedy / Variety Series	Nathan for You	Nominated	
2018	Writers Guild of America Award	Comedy / Variety Series	Nathan for You	Won	
2019	Primetime Emmy Awards	Outstanding Picture Editing for Variety Programming	Who Is America?	Nominated	
2022	Independent Spirit Award	Best New Non-Scripted or Documentary Series	The Rehearsal	Won	
2025	Primetime Emmy Awards	Outstanding Writing for a Comedy Series	The Rehearsal	Nominated	
2026	Peabody Awards	Entertainment	The Rehearsal	Won	
