= List of Nathan for You episodes =

Nathan for You is an American docu-reality comedy television series starring Canadian comedian Nathan Fielder. The series was created by Fielder and Michael Koman and premiered on February 28, 2013, on the American cable television network Comedy Central. In the series, Fielder plays an off-kilter version of himself, who tries to use his business background and life experiences to help struggling companies and people by offering them outlandish strategies.

The last of the 32 episodes of Nathan for You aired on November 9, 2017. On October 17, 2018, Comedy Central announced the show would not return for a fifth season, due to Fielder focusing on other projects.

== Series overview ==
Season	Episodes	Originally released	
Season	Episodes	First released	Last released
1	8	February 28, 2013	April 18, 2013
2	8	July 1, 2014	August 19, 2014
3	8	October 15, 2015	December 10, 2015
Special		September 21, 2017	
4	7	September 28, 2017	November 9, 2017

== Episodes ==
=== Season 1 (2013) ===
No. overall	No. in season	Title	Directed by	Written by	Original release date	Prod. code	U.S. viewers (millions)
1	1	"Yogurt Shop / Pizzeria"	Nathan Fielder	Nathan Fielder, Michael Koman, Dan Mintz, Kyle Mooney and Andrew Weinberg	February 28, 2013	101	0.354
Nathan introduces a "buzzworthy" poo flavor at a frozen yogurt shop. Nathan attends three job interviews: in one he repeats the words of a 7-year-old boy, in another the words of his friend Jon (who is deliberately sabotaging the interview), and another in which he is silent, with the words coming from a turtle. Nathan has a pizzeria give away free pizzas if they do not deliver within 8 minutes, but the free pizza is an inch in diameter.
2	2	"Santa / Petting Zoo"	Nathan Fielder	Nathan Fielder, Michael Koman, Dan Mintz, Kyle Mooney and Andrew Weinberg	March 7, 2013	102	0.570
Nathan tries to have a Santa do photos at a mall during the summer, but his plan is blocked by the mall not allowing Santas with criminal records. He goes ahead with it anyways, only to get kicked out. Nathan attempts to promote a petting zoo by recording a viral video of a pig supposedly rescuing a goat stuck in a pond, with the Santa actor doing the voice-over. The video becomes such a hit that Nathan opts not to name the petting zoo in the video. Nathan lures a teen into spraying graffiti on a poster ad for Nathan for You so that he can expose the teen to his parents and deter him from a life of crime.
3	3	"Clothing Store / Restaurant"	Nathan Fielder	Nathan Fielder, Michael Koman, Dan Mintz, Kyle Mooney and Andrew Weinberg	March 14, 2013	104	0.428
Nathan has a women's clothing store allow "attractive" customers to shoplift a single item, then tells some of them to promote the store to a friend. To judge this, Nathan hires a security guard to determine whether a customer is attractive enough to shoplift. Nathan has a restaurant make their bathrooms available to non-customers, but installs screens in the stalls to play advertising for the restaurant. He asks the owner to include him in her will, which she refuses. He rehires the security guard to test his ability not to blow his cover, by putting him inside an arcade machine at a convenience store and having a man cut the machine open. As a reward for passing, he introduces the guard to Trisha Paytas.
4	4	"Gas Station / Caricature Artist"	Nathan Fielder	Nathan Fielder, Michael Koman, Dan Mintz, Kyle Mooney and Andrew Weinberg	March 21, 2013	103	0.394
Nathan offers a rebate at a gas station but makes customers hike to the top of a mountain, solve a series of riddles, and camp overnight to claim it. After 17 hours, he tells the remaining three customers there is no rebate and they leave, not knowing Nathan was lying. Nathan returns to the station and tells the owner about the friends he made during the hike, during which the owner tells Nathan that he drinks his grandson's urine. Nathan helps a caricature artist by encouraging him to draw offensive, insulting images of beachgoers.
5	5	"Haunted House / The Hunk"	Nathan Fielder; Jason Woliner ("The Hunk")	Nathan Fielder, Michael Koman, Dan Mintz, Kyle Mooney and Andrew Weinberg	March 28, 2013	107	0.467
Nathan makes a haunted house scarier by convincing visitors that they have contracted an airborne disease. Nathan tries to become less awkward with women by dating several young women at once on a fake dating game show. He initially tries to meet women by posing as a smoothie sampler, but is removed by security. On the show, Nathan suspects that some of the contestants have ulterior motives for being there. One of the women moves to kiss him, but he declines before gathering the contestants to review the show is a hoax. He also apologizes to the host (who was unaware of the hoax) for telling some of the contestants about a personal story he had shared. Note: This episode also aired as a special "sneak peek" after Workaholics on March 13, 2013.
6	6	"Funeral Home / Burger Joint / Skydiving"	Nathan Fielder	Nathan Fielder, Michael Koman, Dan Mintz, Kyle Mooney and Andrew Weinberg	April 4, 2013	106	0.441
Nathan has a funeral home offer extras to attend the funerals of the "friendless". At an example funeral, he leads the extras in the singing of an original song. A burger joint offers $100 to customers who do not think their hamburgers are the best in Los Angeles. After offering his own money instead of the owner's, Nathan gets some customers to refuse the $100 by telling them he will fire one of the kitchen staff. Nathan attempts to go skydiving, but avoids doing so due to his fear. He lies to the instructor that he is meeting a friend for lunch, then pays a random man in a parking lot to pose as his friend. He returns to the skydiving business afterwards, but the "skydiving" is footage of a different dive with Nathan and the instructor's faces superimposed on the skydivers.
7	7	"The Claw of Shame"	Jason Woliner; Nathan Fielder ("Failed Ideas")	Nathan Fielder, Michael Koman, Dan Mintz, Kyle Mooney and Andrew Weinberg	April 11, 2013	105	0.517
Nathan highlights failed ideas from the first season (including a germ-free pedal-operated hot dog stand, a video for children whose pets have died, and a magician who secretly tests bar patrons with a breathalyzer to prevent them from driving). He stages a stunt in which he escapes from handcuffs a few seconds before a robotic arm pulls his pants down in front of a group of children with a police officer standing by to arrest him for indecent exposure.
8	8	"Private Investigator / Taxi Company"	Nathan Fielder	Nathan Fielder, Michael Koman, Dan Mintz, Kyle Mooney and Andrew Weinberg	April 18, 2013	108	0.450
Nathan tries to elude a private investigator with several dissimilar "lookalikes", promising to give the investigator his first 5-star Yelp review if he is successful. As part of his plot, Nathan sends one lookalike to his house and goes to the lookalike's apartment, but the man's fiancée does not approve of the stunt. Nathan gives himself up to the investigator, but switches himself with another lookalike before fleeing on foot, ultimately giving the investigator four stars. A taxi service arranges for customers to have a touchscreen system with options in regard to which topics to talk about with their driver. However, a test run nearly fails because the driver did not read the textbooks Nathan gave him. After the owner approves of the plan, Nathan gives him his business card, a sticker on a baby turtle's shell. Nathan helps organize a blind date for show employee Salomon with one of the women from The Hunk, but he is forced to include product placement for Quiznos. The private investigator declines Nathan's invitation to hang out and says he is spending time with his daughter, so Nathan hires a second private investigator to tail the first and learns he was lying. After the second investigator also declines an invitation to hang out, Nathan reflects on his interactions with the people from the season and hires a third private investigator to tail the second.

=== Season 2 (2014) ===
No. overall	No. in season	Title	Directed by	Written by	Original release date	Prod. code	U.S. viewers (millions)
9	1	"Mechanic / Realtor"	Nathan Fielder	Nathan Fielder, Michael Koman and Dan Mintz	July 1, 2014	201	0.710
Nathan works with an auto mechanic by allowing customers to ask for pricing estimates while the mechanic has a lie detector attached to him. Nathan rebrands a Realtor as the "Ghost Realtor", who guarantees that all of the properties that she sells are ghost-free, but is forced to perform an exorcism when a medium senses the presence of an incubus in one of the realtor’s properties. The exorcist also cures Nathan's hemorrhoids and the realtor's bad back.
10	2	"Souvenir Shop / E.L.A.I.F.F."	Nathan Fielder	Nathan Fielder, Michael Koman and Dan Mintz	July 8, 2014	202	0.508
Nathan helps a Hollywood souvenir shop attract business by redefining the storefront to look like an active film set, complete with a Johnny Depp impersonator, before inviting tourists to play "paying customers" as extras. He has a Bill Gates impersonator fill in for the Depp impersonator when he is no longer available. Nathan realizes he actually has to make the film or he will be sued for fraud. He creates his film, The Web, including a kiss scene with an actress playing his girlfriend. After film festivals reject it, Nathan organizes the "Eastern Los Angeles International Film Festival" to give his "film" credibility, including an industry judge (a script supervisor from Bonnie and Clyde) and a competitor film (a 90-second video of a man farting). He tells the actress about the award and asks if she felt anything when they filmed the kiss scene, but she says she felt nothing. Note: This episode was made available for streaming via the Comedy Central app on iOS devices a week before release.
11	3	"Pet Store / Maid Service"	Nathan Fielder	Nathan Fielder, Michael Koman and Dan Mintz	July 15, 2014	203	0.684
Nathan places an ad for a pet store on a huge gravestone (ostensibly for his pet fly Buzz) in a pet cemetery. To avoid arousing suspicion, Nathan holds a traditional Jewish funeral for Buzz. A maid service speeds up its service by having 40 workers clean a house at once. Nathan attempts to improve his personality with the help of a diverse focus group who tell him how to improve his behavior with an earpiece. With their advice, Nathan revisits the private investigator from "Private Investigator" to see if he can get along better, but it does not work. Note: This episode was made available for streaming via the Comedy Central app on iOS devices a week before release.
12	4	"Liquor Store / Exterminator / Car Wash"	Nathan Fielder	Nathan Fielder, Michael Koman and Dan Mintz	July 22, 2014	204	0.603
A liquor store allows minors to pre-order alcohol so customers can take photos with the bottles to look "cool" for their friends, and then pick them up once they reach legal drinking age. Nathan re-brands a pest control business as the "Hotel Excellence Awards" so they can perform their job discreetly. Nathan places chickens in a tree overhanging a street near a car wash, so it can advertise a "Bird Droppings Special". Note: This episode was made available for streaming via the Comedy Central app on iOS devices a week before release.
13	5	"Dumb Starbucks"	Nathan Fielder	Nathan Fielder, Michael Koman and Dan Mintz	July 29, 2014	205	0.801
Nathan helps a struggling coffee shop by re-branding it as a parody of Starbucks. He tricks an attorney into signing an appearance contract that also holds him liable for any lawsuits Starbucks files. Nathan brands himself as a parody artist by making songs and opening an art exhibit, but after growing frustrated with the coffee shop owner not helping with the project, Nathan cuts him off and opens the store independently. The first day is underwhelming, even after Nathan promotes the store in a Starbucks parking lot, but the following day he finds the store has attracted media attention and lines of customers. The fanfare leads Nathan to announce a second location in Brooklyn, but the first location is shut down by the health department for not having permits. After failing to get help from the café owner, Nathan shuts down Dumb Starbucks and leaves a sign telling customers to go to the owner's café.
14	6	"Daddy's Watching / Party Planner"	Nathan Fielder	Nathan Fielder, Michael Koman and Dan Mintz	August 5, 2014	206	0.586
Nathan helps a dating website attract female users by offering a security service called "Daddy's Watching" to protect them on first dates. To test this idea, Nathan acts as Daddy and follows a user and her date at a bowling alley. Satisfied with the plan, Nathan hires a man to act as Daddy. Nathan tries having a party planner offer to filter unwanted guests by having their invitations register as spam e-mails. He tries to showcase this to the planner, but none of his guests arrive except for the hired entertainment, a Bill Gates impersonator. Nathan details how he gets work done; giving a naked photo of himself to a notary and telling her to send it to his grandmother if he does not complete his screenplay. He uses a similar approach to encourage several people to lose weight. When one client fails to reach her goal, Nathan hand-delivers a photo of her holding a banana and sign that says "I hate Jews" to her Jewish boss.
15	7	"Taxi Service / Hot Dog Stand"	Nathan Fielder	Nathan Fielder, Michael Koman and Dan Mintz	August 12, 2014	207	N/A
Nathan has a taxi company offer free rides to pregnant women, as delivering a baby inside a taxi will draw press coverage. He later redesigns the back of the taxi to resemble a hospital room, hoping to find a woman who wants to intentionally give birth there. He finds a pregnant woman and a student midwife to deliver the baby, but the woman and her boyfriend back out after seeing the taxi. Nathan has a hot dog stand allow customers to cut in line if they are legitimately in a hurry, with five valid reasons. Nathan lets one man cut after he claims to have a doctor's appointment, but after Nathan grows suspicious, he tails the man and discovers he was lying. The stand owners dismiss Nathan after he tells them he will "teach the man a lesson he'll never forget". Despite this, Nathan vows to get justice, and tricks the man into thinking he won a lobster meal at sea for being the 10 millionth customer. Once at sea, Nathan presents the man an empty platter and four people he cut in front of. After the legal department vetoes sinking the ship with just the line-cutter on it, Nathan instead makes him grab a shocking gum as punishment.
16	8	"Toy Company / Movie Theatre"	Nathan Fielder	Nathan Fielder, Michael Koman and Dan Mintz	August 19, 2014	208	N/A
Nathan attempts to market for a toy company by stating that owning one of their products is the only way for children to prove they aren't babies. However, he is unable to buy airspace on a local TV station, so he hires the Santa actor from season 1 to promote the toy at a toy store. After the company owner continues to disparage the idea, Nathan buys him a bobblehead with an insulting message. A movie theater implements a no-sharing policy for snacks. When Nathan sees people violating the policy, he dons flashlights and confronts the customers. He installs cameras to catch snack sharers and public masturbators and places their photos on one bulletin board. After learning about the show Cry Wolfe starring the private investigator from season 1, Nathan tries to get the security guard from the first season his own reality TV show. The show is an overly detailed look into a day in the guard's work, including the guard getting distracted by women with large breasts. However, the showrunner refuses the pitch.

=== Season 3 (2015) ===
No. overall	No. in season	Title	Directed by	Written by	Original release date	Prod. code	U.S. viewers (millions)
17	1	"Electronics Store"	Nathan Fielder	Nathan Fielder, Leo Allen, Adam Locke-Norton and Eric Notarnicola	October 15, 2015	301	0.225
Nathan tries to help a struggling electronics store by advertising TVs for $1, and exploiting Best Buy's price matching policy to buy the TVs for $1 and resell them at the electronics store. To prevent customers from buying $1 TVs at the smaller store, Nathan enforces a dress code and installs a wall with a small door and alligator guarding the TVs. However, Best Buy refuses to honor the price matching deal, so Nathan tells the store owner he will file a class-action lawsuit against the company. When the owner grows concerned, Nathan convinces a psychologist that he is delusional so the owner can claim insanity if he is charged with a crime. A judge tells Nathan he needs a Best Buy insider to testify that the company does not adhere to the price match policy, so he recruits an employee through a fake dating show, who confirms they do not always adhere to the policy. To prepare for trial, he calls the people previously hired to buy the Best Buy TVs to rehearse cross-examination. The judge tells Nathan the employee would need to testify on the witness stand, but when the employee refuses, Nathan realizes he has become no better than Best Buy and drops the case. Nathan realizes that friendship is the answer, so he introduces another applicant from the dating show to the TV store owner.
18	2	"Horseback Riding / Man Zone"	Nathan Fielder	Nathan Fielder, Leo Allen, Adam Locke-Norton and Eric Notarnicola	October 22, 2015	302	0.281
Nathan comes up with a way for a ranch to accommodate overweight riders by tethering them to weather balloons to lessen their weight. He brings assistants holding shields to protect the balloons from trees, and incorporates scarecrows attached to drones to repel birds. He also confronts two other customers for laughing at the sight of the customer attached to balloons. However, the ride is a success. A women's boutique attempts to appease male customers by creating a "Man Zone". Nathan drinks beer and watches football with the first guy, but he and his girlfriend leave early without purchasing anything. To prevent this from happening again, he talks about sex with the second guy. However, the store owner is not a fan of drinking in the store. After discovering that the maker of his jacket had published a tribute to alleged Holocaust denier Doug Collins in its catalog, Nathan starts a holocaust awareness-themed clothing company of his own, Summit Ice Apparel. This episode was removed from Paramount+ in 2023 due to concerns of antisemitism. Fielder referenced the removal in an episode of his TV series The Rehearsal.
19	3	"The Movement"	Nathan Fielder	Nathan Fielder, Leo Allen, Adam Locke-Norton and Eric Notarnicola	October 29, 2015	304	N/A
Nathan helps a moving company by promoting an exercise fad known as "The Movement", with the aim of providing the company with labor by having its owner promote himself as a personal trainer. He hires bodybuilder Jack and a ghostwriter to write a book promoting the fad, though the book contains many outlandish claims about the bodybuilder's life, like being childhood friends with Steve Jobs and working with "jungle children". The bodybuilder appears on multiple TV news programs to promote the fad. The book also claims he has never been to a gym, so Nathan provides the bodybuilder with a gym in a storage locker so the bodybuilder can secretly work out. However, Nathan finds the storage locker untouched, so he hires Brian Wolfe again and finds Jack is still attending his regular gym. Nathan confronts Jack and provides him with a disguise to wear while exercising. He then recruits three applicants to move items from client's houses into a truck.
20	4	"Sporting Goods Store / Antique Shop"	Nathan Fielder	Nathan Fielder, Leo Allen, Adam Locke-Norton and Eric Notarnicola	November 5, 2015	303	0.431
Nathan helps a struggling sporting goods store by recruiting promising young soccer players to endorse the brand when they're older. He sees potential in one boy, but when he says he wishes to become an astronaut, he hires the Santa actor to pose as an astronaut and dissuade him. Nathan has an antique shop stay open 24/7 to induce violations of a "you break it, you buy it" rule by customers coming from nearby bars. To help this idea, Nathan befriends a bar patron and brings him to the antique shop dressed in a large costume with the promise of free pizza. After the man breaks products and pays for it, Nathan drives him home. As he says goodbye to the store owner, Nathan intentionally breaks a plate and puts some money on a counter.
21	5	"Smokers Allowed"	Nathan Fielder	Nathan Fielder, Leo Allen, Adam Locke-Norton and Eric Notarnicola	November 12, 2015	305	0.370
Nathan discovers he can allow smoking at a bar if he presents it as a "play" to an audience of two. After the audience members genuinely enjoy the "play", Nathan stages a re-creation of the scenes as an actual performance, with hired actors, to give it legitimacy. The owner does not approve of the play, so Nathan has the actress who portrayed her tell him she loved it.
22	6	"Hotel / Travel Agent"	Nathan Fielder	Nathan Fielder, Leo Allen, Adam Locke-Norton and Eric Notarnicola	November 19, 2015	306	0.389
Nathan develops a way to shield kids from seeing and hearing their parents having sex in the hotel room while on a family vacation, a soundproof isolation box where the child will stay. To test this, Nathan puts a child in the box while seven porn actors have an orgy nearby. Nathan has a travel agent offer funeral services to profit from her elderly customers. To learn more about the process, he and the agent visit a funeral home under the guise of the agent having a terminal illness. After learning cremation is becoming more popular, Nathan finds the only oven he could afford is one that makes pizzas, so he builds a calzone shaped like a cadaver to test if it would cremate. After the pitch fails on a customer, Nathan reflects on his own mortality and decides to spend more time focused on the little things. Nathan shares his motorcycle-based solution for never getting stuck in traffic: He has two interns on a motorcycle, and if there is traffic, he switches with the backseat intern and splits lanes to his destination. Nathan decides this would make a good business, so he recruits a biker couple to be the drivers. However, motorists are unwilling to let strangers drive their cars. Note: This is the only episode of the series to be rated TV-MA.
23	7	"Nail Salon / Fun"	Nathan Fielder	Nathan Fielder, Leo Allen, Adam Locke-Norton and Eric Notarnicola	December 3, 2015	307	0.383
Nathan finds a way to protect women's nail polish from chipping by having them offer a valet service. He initially has the nail technicians act as valets, but finds customers are hesitant to have Asian women drive their cars due to stereotypes, so he hires an Asian American stunt driver. Nathan finds a way to scientifically prove that he is fun, by finding a man on Craigslist named Brandon. He discreetly collects the man's urine to measure the serotonin before they head out. After trying on hats and going go-karting, Nathan convinces his new friend to get his blood drawn. The tests reveal Brandon's serotonin levels were much higher at the end of the day, proving Nathan is a fun person. Convinced they could be real friends, Nathan tells Brandon about the tests, and though he is unnerved by his urine being collected, he agrees to go to an amusement park with Nathan.
24	8	"The Hero"	Jason Woliner	Nathan Fielder, Leo Allen, Adam Locke-Norton and Eric Notarnicola	December 10, 2015	308	0.414
Nathan sets out to impersonate another person in an effort to turn him into a humanitarian hero. He finds an arcade attendant named Corey and recruits him under the guise of a reality show. Nathan drives Corey out to an RV in the desert, then books a radio appearance to promote a tightrope walk for breast cancer awareness while wearing a prosthetic mask of Corey's face. He also goes on a date with a woman and gets her to agree to give Corey a kiss after the walk. Corey's grandparents grow concerned after seeing an ad for the walk, so Nathan uses a megaphone and soundboard of Corey's voice to have a conversation with them across a street, under the guise of the hotel being under lockdown. Nathan does the tightrope walk successfully, but decides to cross the wire five more times before switching with Corey. The plan is successful, making Corey look like a hero, and after removing the prosthetics, Nathan watches Corey and his girlfriend enter the crowd before walking off.

=== Special (2017) ===
No.	Title	Directed by	Written by	Original release date	U.S. viewers (millions)
25	"A Celebration"	Nathan Fielder	Nathan Fielder, Leo Allen, Michael Koman, Adam Locke-Norton and Eric Notarnicola	September 21, 2017	0.211
In a special episode hosted by Anthony Napoli ("The Hunk"), Nathan checks in with former guests of the show. Susan Stanford ("Realtor") continues to operate as the Ghost Realtor and filmed a television pilot with the exorcist Ron Bard from that episode, who has since died. Susan works with a new psychic to contact Ron from beyond the grave. Former teenage vandal Kyle Heitz ("Santa / Petting Zoo") now works as a vape pen salesman. Nathan thinks his tattoos are hindering his sales, and convinces Kyle to get laser tattoo removal on a wrist tattoo of a woman's breasts. One of the teenagers from "Liquor Store", now of legal drinking age, gets to claim his liquor. Nathan finds recurring private investigator Brian Wolfe's appearances in nude magazines. Anthony interviews recurring staff member Salomon Flores. Corey Calderwood ("The Hero") has a new girlfriend and lives in Fresno. As thanks for hosting, Nathan gives Anthony 15 seconds to promote himself. Other appearances include former judge Anthony Filosa, strongman Jack Garbarino ("The Method"), and recurring security guard Simon Kellogg. This episode also features an original song, "Won't Be the Same".

=== Season 4 (2017) ===
No. overall	No. in season	Title	Directed by	Written by	Original release date	Prod. code	U.S. viewers (millions)
26	1	"The Richards Tip"	Nathan Fielder	Nathan Fielder, Leo Allen, Michael Koman, Adam Locke-Norton and Eric Notarnicola	September 28, 2017	401	0.293
Nathan helps a small-town diner by suggesting that Michael Richards had left a $10,000 tip at it. To do so, he hires an impersonator. He also tries to prevent allegations of fraud by finding a person also named Michael Richards to use their card, but none of them are willing to let Nathan spend $10,000 of their money, so he instead finds a man willing to temporarily change his name to Michael Richards. Nathan learns name changes must be publicized in a newspaper for four weeks, so he creates a newspaper called The Diarrhea Times and hires the ghostwriter from "The Movement" to write the articles. Nathan learns Michael was once charged with armed robbery, so he handcuffs themselves to prevent him from stealing it. The plan works, and Nathan has The Diarrhea Times produce a final article about the $10,000 tip.
27	2	"Chili Shop / Massage Parlor"	Nathan Fielder	Nathan Fielder, Leo Allen, Michael Koman, Adam Locke-Norton and Eric Notarnicola	October 5, 2017	402	0.331
Nathan helps a chili-selling business by infiltrating Rabobank Arena to sell it, hidden underneath a body suit. He modifies the bodysuit to allow for bathroom access and protect him from the chili's heat. The suit also provides for cheese, sour cream, and chives. Nathan tapes a pacemaker to his chest and gets an x-ray that makes it appear as if he has one implanted, allowing him to get past the metal detector without suspicion. At a Bakersfield Condors game, Nathan successfully sells 16 bowls of chili without security noticing. Nathan helps a massage parlor by encouraging clients to upgrade to a more expensive session through hiring untrained masseuses with contagious warts to massage clients in the cheaper sessions. Nathan creates a fake charity called CityWarts that helps people with warts and gets City Councilman Ed Reyes to attend a gala and endorse the charity.
28	3	"Andy vs. Uber"	Nathan Fielder	Nathan Fielder, Leo Allen, Michael Koman, Adam Locke-Norton and Eric Notarnicola	October 12, 2017	403	0.252
Nathan helps a previous client of his–Andy, a taxi driver–to attempt to blackmail Uber into discontinuing their "baby onesie" promotion, which gives free onesies to babies born in Uber cars, incorporated by Uber at a suspiciously close time to Nathan's preceding mission. Nathan's plan is to create a sleeper cell of taxi drivers to get jobs with Uber to threaten the company with. Since sleeper cells typically have anonymous leaders, Nathan anonymously hires a man from Craigslist to buy and deliver burner phones. To decide what annoys Uber passengers the most, Andy goes undercover as a driver and tests several of the most common complaints. Disguised with bandages, Nathan recruits cab drivers to the cause. They meet some taxi drivers, who recruit even more cabbies to their cause. Nathan records the threatening video and shows it to Andy, but Andy gets concerned about criminal charges, leading Nathan to worry about being deported to Canada. To get American citizenship, Nathan disguises a set to resemble a Chinese restaurant and hires a Chinese man to secretly officiate a wedding between Nathan and Andy. Nathan prepares to send the video to Uber, but learns Andy has been driving with Uber for real. Nathan abandons the plan and gets the marriage annulled, accepting Andy's status as an Uber driver.
29	4	"The Anecdote"	Nathan Fielder	Nathan Fielder, Leo Allen, Michael Koman, Adam Locke-Norton and Eric Notarnicola	October 19, 2017	404	0.237
Believing that his previous appearances on late-night talk shows were too boring, Nathan spends $350,000 of the show's budget to execute an outlandish and unlikely series of events he can accurately recount as an anecdote on Jimmy Kimmel Live! In the story, Nathan mixes up his suitcase with a larger man's while on his way to a wedding, gets pulled over by a cop who notices he has a bag of powder, and calls the other man, who reveals the powder is his mother's ashes. To sell his story, Nathan finds a couple planning a wedding and convinces them to let him stop by on the day of. He finds a man with a large suit but an alive mother, but he finds a workaround by burning some of her loose hair, fingernails, and other small body parts. On the day of the wedding, Nathan flies to San Francisco and back and fulfills the anecdote to the part where he wears the large suit. The production team hires a sheriff's deputy to pull Nathan over and recite the dialogue before Nathan attends the wedding. On the day of the Kimmel appearance, Nathan hears Kirsten Dunst recite her story, also involving a wedding, a luggage mixup, and something mistaken for drugs. However, Nathan's story has the humorous visual of him in the oversized suit, and the anecdote receives laughs from the audience.
30	5	"Shipping Logistics Company"	Nathan Fielder	Nathan Fielder, Leo Allen, Michael Koman, Adam Locke-Norton and Eric Notarnicola	October 26, 2017	405	0.311
Nathan tries to help a shipping company save money on tariffs by classifying smoke detectors as musical instruments. After learning that the detectors must be recognized as an instrument by the general public, Nathan recruits band members to create a hit single. He puts a guitarist on the smoke detector and records the song, "Orphaned Skies", under the band name The Banzai Predicament. However, a radio station refuses to play it, so Nathan decides to get it on the news instead. Using an oil spill incident by Shell near the city of Tracy, Nathan organizes a public meeting and hires a man to be a P.R. employee. At the end of the meeting, the employee plays a promotional video that contains "Orphaned Skies", which Nathan films and shows to the band's singer to anger him. The band plays a protest performance outside a Shell gas station, attaching their stage to a truck and giving people free gas. The protest gets coverage from KTLA. Nathan successfully sends a package of smoke detectors overseas, and he organizes a meeting between the "Shell" employee and the band singer to make amends.
31	6	"Computer Repair / Psychic"	Nathan Fielder	Nathan Fielder, Leo Allen, Michael Koman, Adam Locke-Norton and Eric Notarnicola	November 2, 2017	406	0.226
Nathan helps a computer repair shop by recruiting asexual technicians, under the belief that they would be less likely to look at pornography stored on clients' computers. To prevent the sexual desires of the store owner from contaminating the computer, Nathan sets up a private booth for the asexuals where the owner can give them instructions. He also installs an alarm and computer cage so that the owner can enter the booth to use the bathroom inside. Nathan helps a psychic promote her services by running "personal" billboards and advertisements with messages addressed to "Maria Garcia"–a name that is common among residents. However, the first Maria Garcia is underwhelmed by the reading, so Nathan decides to make the psychic's prediction of a "mystery man" come true. Having posed as a documentarian, Nathan has Salomon act as a makeup artist so he can connect with Maria before an interview. Maria agrees to hang out as friends, but not to a proper date.
32	7	"Finding Frances"	Nathan Fielder	Nathan Fielder, Leo Allen, Michael Koman, Adam Locke-Norton and Eric Notarnicola	November 9, 2017	499	0.240
Nathan helps William Heath, a Bill Gates impersonator from previous episodes, try to find his long-lost love (90-minute series finale).
