= 70th Writers Guild of America Awards =

70th WGA Awards
- Date: February 11, 2018
- Organized by: Writers Guild of America, East and the Writers Guild of America, West

The 70th Writers Guild of America Awards honored the best in film, television, radio and video-game writing of 2017. Winners were announced on February 11, 2018, at the Beverly Hilton Hotel, Beverly Hills, California and the Edison Ballroom, New York City, New York. The nominations for Television, New Media, Radio, News and Promotional Writing were announced on December 7, 2017, the Theatrical and Documentary Screenplay nominees were announced on January 4, 2018, and the Videogame Writing nominees were announced on January 11, 2018.

The West Coast show was hosted by Patton Oswalt and the East Coast show was hosted by Amber Ruffin.

== Nominees ==
=== Film ===
Best Original Screenplay

Get Out (Universal Pictures) – Jordan Peele†

- The Big Sick (Amazon Studios) – Emily V. Gordon and Kumail Nanjiani
- I, Tonya (Neon) – Steven Rogers
- Lady Bird (A24) – Greta Gerwig
- The Shape of Water (Fox Searchlight) – Guillermo del Toro and Vanessa Taylor; story by Guillermo del Toro
Best Adapted Screenplay

Call Me by Your Name (Sony Pictures Classics) – James Ivory; based on the novel by André Aciman†

- The Disaster Artist (A24) – Scott Neustadter and Michael H. Weber; based on the book by Greg Sestero and Tom Bissell
- Logan (20th Century Fox) – Scott Frank, James Mangold and Michael Green; story by James Mangold; based on characters from the X-Men comic books and theatrical motion pictures
- Molly's Game (STX Entertainment) – Aaron Sorkin; based on the book by Molly Bloom
- Mudbound (Netflix) – Virgil Williams and Dee Rees; based on the novel by Hillary Jordan
Best Documentary Screenplay

Jane (National Geographic) – Brett Morgen

- Betting on Zero (Gunpowder & Sky) – Ted Braun
- No Stone Unturned (Abramorama) – Alex Gibney
- Oklahoma City (American Experience) – Barak Goodman

=== Television ===
Drama Series

The Handmaid's Tale (Hulu) – Ilene Chaiken, Nina Fiore, Dorothy Fortenberry, Leila Gerstein, John Herrera, Lynn Maxcy, Bruce Miller, Kira Snyder, Wendy Straker Hauser, Eric Tuchman

- The Americans (FX) – Peter Ackerman, Hilary Bettis, Joshua Brand, Joel Fields, Stephen Schiff, Joe Weisberg, Tracey Scott Wilson
- Better Call Saul (AMC) – Ann Cherkis, Vince Gilligan, Jonathan Glatzer, Peter Gould, Gennifer Hutchison, Heather Marion, Thomas Schnauz, Gordon Smith
- Game of Thrones (HBO) – David Benioff, Bryan Cogman, Dave Hill, D. B. Weiss
- Stranger Things (Netflix) – Paul Dichter, Justin Doble, The Duffer Brothers, Jessica Mecklenburg, Jessie Nickson-Lopez, Alison Tatlock
Comedy Series

Veep (HBO) – Rachel Axler, Sean Gray, Alex Gregory, Peter Huyck, Eric Kenward, Billy Kimball, Steve Koren, David Mandel, Jim Margolis, Lew Morton, Georgia Pritchett, Will Smith, Alexis Wilkinson

- Curb Your Enthusiasm (HBO) – Larry David, Jon Hayman, Justin Hurwitz, Jeff Schaffer
- GLOW (Netflix) – Arabella Anderson, Kristoffer Diaz, Liz Flahive, Tara Herrmann, Nick Jones, Jenji Kohan, Carly Mensch, Emma Rathbone, Sascha Rothchild, Rachel Shukert
- Master of None (Netflix) – Aziz Ansari, Andrew Blitz, Zoe Jarman, Cord Jefferson, Sarah Peters, Sarah Schneider, Michael Schur, Leila Strachan, Gene Stupnitsky, Lakshmi Sundaram, Lena Waithe, Jason Woliner, Alan Yang
- Silicon Valley (HBO) – Alec Berg, Donick Cary, Adam Countee, Jonathan Dotan, Mike Judge, Carrie Kemper, John Levenstein, Dan Lyons, Carson Mell, Dan O'Keefe, Clay Tarver, Aaron Zelman
New Series

The Handmaid's Tale (Hulu) – Ilene Chaiken, Nina Fiore, Dorothy Fortenberry, Leila Gerstein, John Herrera, Lynn Maxcy, Bruce Miller, Kira Snyder, Wendy Straker Hauser, Eric Tuchman

- American Vandal (Netflix) – Seth Cohen, Lauren Herstik, Dan Lagana, Kevin McManus, Matthew McManus, Jessica Meyer, Dan Perrault, Amy Pocha, Mike Rosolio, Tony Yacenda
- The Deuce (HBO) – Megan Abbott, Marc Henry Johnson, Lisa Lutz, George Pelecanos, Richard Price, Will Ralston, David Simon, Chris Yakaitis
- GLOW (Netflix) – Arabella Anderson, Kristoffer Diaz, Liz Flahive, Tara Herrmann, Nick Jones, Jenji Kohan, Carly Mensch, Emma Rathbone, Sascha Rothchild, Rachel Shukert
- Ozark (Netflix) – Whit Anderson, Bill Dubuque, Ryan Farley, Alyson Feltes, Paul Kolsby, David Manson, Chris Mundy, Mark Williams, Ning Zhou, Martin Zimmerman
Long Form – Original

Flint (Lifetime) – Barbara Stepansky

- American Horror Story: Cult (FX) – Brad Falchuk, John J. Gray, Joshua Green, Todd Kubrak, Crystal Liu, Tim Minear, Ryan Murphy, Adam Penn, James Wong
- Feud: Bette and Joan (FX) – Jaffe Cohen, Tim Minear, Ryan Murphy, Gina Welch, Michael Zam
- Godless (Netflix) – Scott Frank
- Manhunt: Unabomber (Discovery Channel) – Jim Clemente, Tony Gittelson, Max Hurwitz, Steven Katz, Nick Schenk, Andrew Sodroski, Nick Towne
Long Form – Adapted

Big Little Lies (HBO) – David E. Kelley, Based on the novel by Liane Moriarty

- Fargo (FX) – Monica Beletsky, Bob DeLaurentis, Noah Hawley, Ben Nedivi, Matt Wolpert, Based on the film directed by Joel Coen
- The Immortal Life of Henrietta Lacks (HBO) – Peter Landesman, Alexander Woo, George C. Wolfe, Based on the book by Rebecca Skloot
- The Wizard of Lies (HBO) – Sam Levinson, John Burnham Schwartz and Samuel Baum, Based on the book by Diana B. Henriques and Truth and Consequences by Laurie Sandell
Short Form New Media – Adapted

"Starboy" – Zac & Mia (fxnetworks.com) – Allen Clary and Andrew Rothschild, Based on the novel by A.J. Betts

- "Chapter 2" – The Walking Dead: Red Machete (amc.com) – Nick Bernardone
- "John Hancock" – Marvel's Agents of S.H.I.E.L.D.: Slingshot (abc.go.com) – James C. Oliver & Sharla Oliver
- "Justicia" – Marvel's Agents of S.H.I.E.L.D.: Slingshot (abc.go.com) – Mark Leitner
Animation

"Time's Arrow" – BoJack Horseman (Netflix) – Kate Purdy

- "Brunchsquatch" – Bob's Burgers (Fox) – Lizzie Molyneux & Wendy Molyneux
- "A Father's Watch" – The Simpsons (Fox) – Simon Rich
- "Ruthie" – BoJack Horseman (Netflix) – Joanna Calo
- "The Serfsons" – The Simpsons (Fox) – Brian Kelley
Episodic Drama

"Chicanery" – Better Call Saul (AMC) – Gordon Smith

- "The Book of Nora" – The Leftovers (HBO) – Tom Perrotta, Damon Lindelof, Tom Spezialy
- "The Heart Attack is the Best Way" – Good Behavior (TNT) – Chad Hodge
- "Homecoming" – The OA (Netflix) – Brit Marling & Zal Batmanglij
- "Slip" – Better Call Saul (AMC) – Heather Marion
- "The Soviet Decision" – The Americans (FX) – Joe Weisberg & Joel Fields
Episodic Comedy

"Rosario's Quinceanera" – Will & Grace (NBC) – Tracy Poust & Jon Kinnally

- "The Burglary" – Grace and Frankie (Netflix) – Brendan McCarthy & David Budin
- "Intervention" – The Carmichael Show (NBC) – Willie Hunter
- "Judge" – Veep (HBO) – Carrie Rosen & Seth Kurland
- "The Verdict" – Trial & Error (NBC) – Jeff Astrof
Comedy/Variety – Talk Series

Last Week Tonight with John Oliver (HBO) – Tim Carvell, Josh Gondelman, Dan Gurewitch, Geoff Haggerty, Jeff Maurer, John Oliver, Scott Sherman, Will Tracy, Jill Twiss, Juli Weiner, Ben Silva, Seena Vali

- Conan (TBS) – Matt O’Brien, Jose Arroyo, Daniel Cronin, Andres du Bouchet, Jessie Gaskell, Michael Gordon, Brian Kiley, Laurie Kilmartin, Leah Krinsky, Stephen Kutner, Todd Levin, Levi MacDougall, Conan O'Brien, Paul Richter, Frank Smiley, Mike Sweeney
- The Daily Show with Trevor Noah (Comedy Central) – Dan Amira, David Angelo, Steve Bodow, Kashana Cauley, Devin Delliquanti, Zach DiLanzo, Hallie Haglund, David Kibuuka, Matt Koff, Adam Lowitt, Dan McCoy, Trevor Noah, Joe Opio, Zhubin Parang, Owen Parsons, Daniel Radosh, Lauren Sarver-Means, Michelle Wolf
- Full Frontal with Samantha Bee (TBS) – Samantha Bee, Ashley Nicole Black, Pat Cassels, Eric Drysdale, Mathan Erhardt, Travon Free, Joe Grossman, Jo Miller, Jason Reich, Melinda Taub
- The Jim Jefferies Show (Comedy Central) – Jason Reich, Jim Jefferies, Subhah Agarwal, Kevin Avery, Curtis Cook, Lucas Kavner, Matt Kirshen, Bryan Olsen, Laura Willcox, JJ Whitehead, Scott Y. Zabielski
- Jimmy Kimmel Live! (ABC) – Jimmy Kimmel, Tony Barbieri, Jonathan Bines, Joelle Boucai, Gonzalo Cordova, Devin Field, Gary Greenberg, Josh Halloway, Sal Iacono, Eric Immerman, Jesse Joyce, Bess Kalb, Jeff Loveness, Molly McNearney, CeCe Pleasants, Danny Ricker, Joe Strazzullo
- Late Night with Seth Meyers (NBC) – Jermaine Affonso, Alex Baze, Bryan Donaldson, Sal Gentile, Matt Goldich, Dina Gusovsky, Jenny Hagel, Allison Hord, Mike Karnell, John Lutz, Seth Meyers, Ian Morgan, Seth Reiss, Amber Ruffin, Mike Scollins, Mike Shoemaker, Ben Warheit
- Real Time with Bill Maher (HBO) – Scott Carter, Adam Felber, Matt Gunn, Brian Jacobsmeyer, Jay Jaroch, Chris Kelly, Bill Maher, Billy Martin, Bob Oschack, Danny Vermont
Comedy/Variety - Sketch Series

Saturday Night Live (NBC) – Chris Kelly, Sarah Schneider, Bryan Tucker; Writers: James Anderson, Kristen Bartlett, Jeremy Beiler, Neal Brennan, Zack Bornstein, Megan Callahan, Michael Che, Anna Drezen, Fran Gillespie, Sudi Green, Steve Higgins, Colin Jost, Erik Kenward, Rob Klein, Nick Kocher, Michael Koman, Dave McCary, Brian McElhaney, Dennis McNicholas, Drew Michael, Lorne Michaels, Josh Patten, Katie Rich, Pete Schultz, Streeter Seidell, Will Stephen, Kent Sublette, Julio Torres

- Nathan For You (Comedy Central) – Leo Allen, Nathan Fielder, Carrie Kemper, Adam Locke-Norton, Eric Notarnicola
- Portlandia (IFC) – Fred Armisen, Carrie Brownstein, Karen Kilgariff, Jonathan Krisel, Graham Wagner
- The President Show (Comedy Central) – Emily Altman, Anthony Atamanuik, Emmy Blotnick, Neil Casey, Mike Drucker, Noah Garfinkel, John Gemberling, Peter Grosz, Mitra Jouhari, John Knefel, Alison Leiby, Christine Nangle, John Reynolds, Jason Ross, Rae Sanni, Evan Waite
- Weekend Update Summer Edition (NBC) – Megan Callahan, Michael Che, Mikey Day, Steve Higgins, Colin Jost, Dennis McNicholas, Josh Patten, Katie Rich, Pete Schultz, Streeter Seidell, Kent Sublette, Bryan Tucker
Comedy/Variety (Music, Awards, Tributes) – Specials

39th Kennedy Center Honors (CBS) – Dave Boone

- 89th Academy Awards (ABC) – Billy Kimball, Jon Macks; Special Material Written by Jack Allison, Tony Barbieri, Jonathan Bines, Joelle Boucai, Gonzalo Cordova, Gary Greenberg, Josh Halloway, Sal Iacono, Eric Immerman, Bess Kalb, Jimmy Kimmel, Jeff Loveness, Molly McNearney, Danny Ricker, Joe Strazzullo
- AFI Life Achievement Award: A Tribute to Diane Keaton (TNT) – Bob Gazzale & Jon Macks
- Michael Bolton's Big, Sexy Valentine's Day Special (Netflix) – Scott Aukerman, Dave Ferguson, Mike Hanford, Tim Kalpakis, Joe Saunders, Akiva Schaffer; Additional Material Written by Zach Kanin, Claudia O'Doherty, Tim Robinson
- Nathan For You: A Celebration (Comedy Central) – Leo Allen, Nathan Fielder, Carrie Kemper, Michael Koman, Adam Locke-Norton, Eric Notarnicola
Quiz and Audience Participation

Hollywood Game Night (NBC) – Head Writer: Grant Taylor; Writers: Michael Agbabian, Alex Chauvin, Ann Slichter and Dwight D. Smith

- Jeopardy! (ABC) – Matthew Caruso, John Duarte, Harry Friedman, Mark Gaberman, Deborah Griffin, Michele Loud, Robert McClenaghan, Jim Rhine, Steve D. Tamerius, Billy Wisse
Daytime Drama

General Hospital (ABC) – Head Writers: Shelly Altman, Jean Passanante; Writers: Anna Theresa Cascio, Suzanne Flynn, Charlotte Gibson, Lucky Gold, Kate Hall, Elizabeth Korte, Daniel James O'Connor, Dave Rupel, Katherine Schock, Scott Sickles, Christopher Van Etten, Christopher Whitesell

- Days of Our Lives (NBC) – Ron Carlivati, Sheri Anderson, Lorraine Broderick, David Cherrill, Lisa Connor, Carolyn Culliton, Richard Culliton, Rick Draughon, Cydney Kelley, David Kreizman, David A. Levinson, Rebecca McCarty, Ryan Quan, Dave Ryan, Elizabeth Snyder, Tyler Topits
Children's Script – Episodic and Specials

"An American Girl Story – Ivy & Julie 1976: A Happy Balance" – American Girl (Amazon) – May Chan

- "American Girl – Summer Camp, Friends for Life" – American Girl (Amazon) – Alison McDonald and Caron Tschampion
- "Just Add 1965" – Just Add Magic (Amazon) – Lauren Thompson
- "Meet Julia" – Sesame Street (HBO) – Belinda Ward
- The Magical Wand Chase: A Sesame Street Special (HBO) – Raye Lankford, Jessica Carleton, Ken Scarborough

==== Documentary ====
Documentary Script – Current Events

Confronting ISIS – Frontline (PBS) – Martin Smith

- Poverty, Politics and Profit – Frontline (PBS) – Rick Young
- Unseen Enemy (CNN) – Janet Tobias
Documentary Script – Other than Current Events

The Great War "Part II" – American Experience (PBS) – Stephen Ives

- Divided States of America "Part One" – Frontline (PBS) – Michael Kirk & Mike Wiser
- Rachel Carson – American Experience (PBS) – Michelle Ferrari
- The Great War "Part III" – American Experience (PBS) – Rob Rapley
- "Things Fall Apart" – The Vietnam War (PBS) – Geoffrey C. Ward

==== News ====
TV News Script – Regularly Scheduled, Bulletin, or Breaking Report

"White Helmets" – 60 Minutes (CBS News) – Scott Pelley, Nicole Young, Katie Kerbstat

- "Obama Wiretap Allegations" – World News Tonight With David Muir (ABC News) – Mark Berman, Barbara Rick, Tom Llamas
- "September 29, 2017" – World News Now (ABC News) – Matt Nelko, Jack Sheahan, Debbie Humes, Carla Brittain, Constance Johnson, Lloyd deVries, Craig Morancie
TV News Script – Analysis, Feature, or Commentary

"Chief of Chobani" – 60 Minutes (CBS) – Steve Kroft, Oriana Zill de Granados

- "Fighting Famine" – 60 Minutes (CBS) – Scott Pelley, Nicole Young
Digital News

"The Super Predators" (Huffingtonpost.com) – Melissa Jeltsen, Dana Liebelson

- "At the Capitol With Those for Whom Last Night Mattered the Most" (SplinterNews.com) – Emma Roller
- "Becoming Ugly" (Jezebel.com) – Madeleine Davies
- "Why Did Politicon Make Me Want To Die?" (SplinterNews.com) – Libby Watson

=== Radio ===
Radio Documentary

"CBS Radio 90th Anniversary" (CBS Radio News) – Dianne E. James

- "2016 Year in Review" (CBS Radio News) – Gail Lee
- "Castro, Cuba & Communism" (CBS Radio News) – Thomas A. Sabella
- "Remembering Princess Diana 20 Years Later" (ABC News Radio) – Andrew Evans
Radio News Script – Regularly Scheduled, Bulletin, or Breaking Report

"World News This Week: June 9, 2017" (ABC News Radio) – Tara Gimbel Tanis

- "Hugh Hefner: A Social Revolutionary in Silk Pajamas" (CBS Radio News) – Gail Lee
- "World News This Week: November 18, 2016" (ABC News Radio) – Joan B. Harris
Radio News Script – Analysis, Feature, or Commentary

"Dishin Digital on WCBS-AM" (WCBS-AM Radio) – Robert Hawley

- "Chuck Berry" (KNX) – Jerry Edling
- "Holiday Stories" (CBS Radio News) – Gail Lee
- "One Nation, Overdosed: An Investigative Report" (ABC News Radio) – Tara Gimbel Tanis

=== Promotional Writing ===
On-Air Promotion – Television or Radio

"CBS Comedy" (CBS) – Dan Greenberger

- "The Good Fight" (CBS) – Brian Retchless

=== Videogaming Writing ===
Outstanding Achievement in Videogame Writing

Horizon Zero Dawn (Guerrilla Games) – Narrative Director: John Gonzalez; Lead Writer: Benjamin McCaw; Writers: Ben Schroder, Anne Toole; Additional Writing: Dee Warrick, Meg Jayanth

- Dishonored: Death of the Outsider (Arkane Studios-Bethesda Softworks) – External Writers: Anna Megill, Hazel Monforton; Lead Narrative Designer: Sachka Duval
- Futurama: Worlds of Tomorrow (TinyCo) – Cas Ruffin and Patric M. Verrone
- Madden NFL 18: Longshot (EA Tiburon) – Michael Young and Adrian Todd Zuniga; story by Michael Young
