= Brian Wolfe (disambiguation) =

Brian Wolfe (1980–2026) was an American baseball player.

Brian Wolfe may also refer to:

- Brian Wolfe, fictional private investigator in American television show Cry Wolfe
- Brian Wolff, tuba player in instrumental rock group Drums & Tuba
- Brian Wolff, drummer in American nu metal band Otep
