= Summit Ice Apparel =

Not-for-profit apparel company

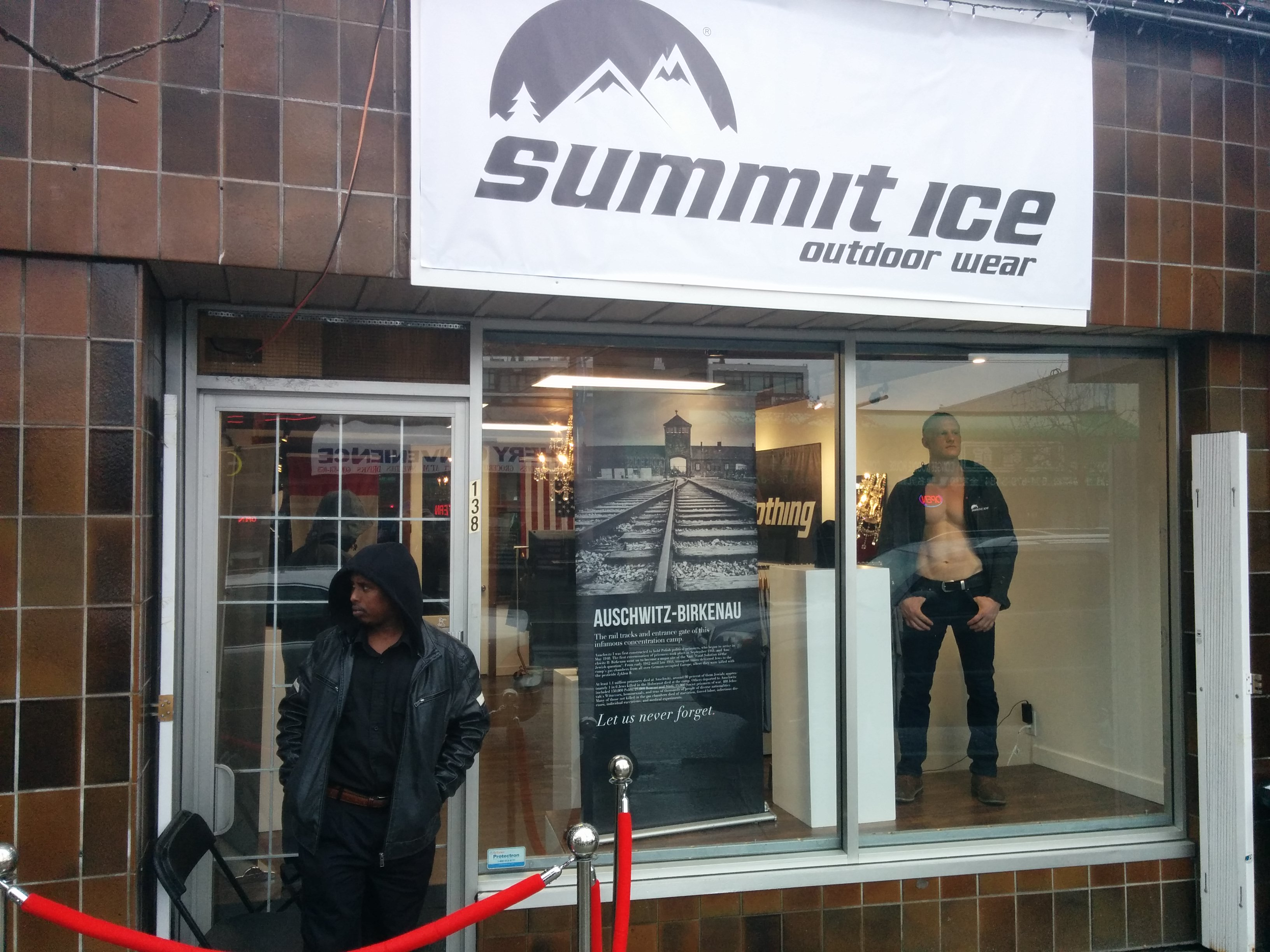
A Summit Ice pop-up store in 2017

Summit Ice Apparel is a not-for-profit apparel company founded by comedian Nathan Fielder. Fielder started the company in 2015, in response to Vancouver-based company Taiga posting a tribute to Holocaust denier Doug Collins. The company has been featured in two of Fielder's projects, the Comedy Central series Nathan For You and the HBO series The Rehearsal. The company's main product is soft shell jackets. 100% of Summit Ice Apparel's profits go to the Vancouver Holocaust Education Centre in Vancouver. The company's slogan is "Deny Nothing", which was expanded to "Deny Nothing. Stand for Everything" in 2025.

== History ==
=== 2015–2024 ===
Comedian Nathan Fielder decided to produce his own soft shell jackets in 2015, after learning Vancouver-based company Taiga posted a tribute to journalist and Holocaust denier Doug Collins in one of their winter catalogues. This endeavor was shown during season 3 of Nathan for You. In its first eight weeks, the company generated $300,000 in sales. Fielder described it as "the first outdoor apparel company to openly promote the true story of the Holocaust".

In March 2017, Fielder opened up a pop-up shop in Vancouver where members of the public could buy Summit Ice Apparel or exchange their Taiga jacket for a Summit Ice jacket.

=== 2025 resurgence ===
The second episode of Nathan For You's third season, which featured Summit Ice Apparel, was removed by Paramount+ worldwide after the Germany division of the streaming service expressed concerns of antisemitism. Fielder expressed disappointment with this decision in the second episode of The Rehearsal's second season, referencing Summit Ice Apparel as his "proudest achievement".

This episode aligned with the company announcing new products and introducing "Stand for Everything" as an additional tagline after "Deny Nothing". The new product line was called the Cypress Collection, which the website claimed was "born out of shame", stating the company had prioritized Holocaust awareness above quality.

== See also ==
- Dumb Starbucks
