= Finding Frances =

- Nathan for You episode
- Episode no.: Season 4 Episode 8
- Directed by: Nathan Fielder
- Written by: Nathan Fielder; Leo Allen; Carrie Kemper; Michael Koman; Adam Locke-Norton; Eric Notarnicola
- Cinematography by: Marco Cordero
- Editing by: Andrew Fitzgerald; Adam Locke-Norton; Eric Notarnicola
- Original air date: November 9, 2017
- Running time: 84 minutes

Episode chronology
← Previous "Computer Repair/Psychic"	Next → —

"Finding Frances" is the series finale of the American docu-reality comedy series Nathan for You. It aired on Comedy Central on November 9, 2017. The eighth episode of the fourth season and the 32nd overall, it was directed by Nathan Fielder and co-written with Leo Allen, Carrie Kemper, Michael Koman, Adam Locke-Norton, and Eric Notarnicola. "Finding Frances" follows Nathan as he attempts to help recurring guest star Bill Heath track down Frances, a lost love from his youth. It has an extended runtime of 84 minutes and a more serious tone than previous episodes. While it was initially billed as simply the season finale, one year later Comedy Central confirmed that Fielder had decided to end the series. "Finding Frances" received universal acclaim and was named one of the most memorable TV episodes of 2017 by the New York Times.

== Synopsis ==
78-year-old Bill Heath (who first appeared in second-season episode "Souvenir Shop / E.L.A.I.F.F." as a Bill Gates impersonator) frequently visits the Nathan for You production office. During his visits Bill is preoccupied by a woman named Frances Gaddy, whom he dated in his youth and lost touch with. Nathan decides to use the show's resources to help him track down Frances. They fly to Bill's hometown of Little Rock, Arkansas to start the search. Shortly after arriving Nathan is troubled to learn from Bill's niece that she didn't know that he had ever been a professional Bill Gates impersonator. Bill denies ever saying he was, but Nathan says he has it on camera.

Frances graduated from Dumas High School in Dumas, Arkansas, so they form a plan to gain access to the high school's archive of yearbooks. They pose as the producers of Mud 2: Never Clean, a fictional sequel to Mud, because it was filmed in Dumas. Under this veil of legitimacy, they find the correct yearbook. After Bill finds Frances' photo, Nathan flies in age progressionist Cornelius Ladd (who appeared in the episode "Sporting Goods Store / Antique Shop") to create a contemporary photo of Frances. They post flyers with the image around town and are contacted by a man who thinks it may be his great-grandmother, but when they go meet her, she is not Frances Gaddy.

Bill attends his 60th reunion at Little Rock Central High, which gives Nathan the idea to hold a 57th reunion at Dumas High School in hopes that an alumnus who knows Frances' whereabouts will attend. However, no one at the reunion knows where she is or has heard from her.

Bill finds letters he received from Frances 50 years ago and they confirm a deep love affair that was marred by Bill's infidelity and other untoward behavior. Nathan hires an escort, Maci, to see how Bill would conduct himself with a woman, but when Bill refuses to meet Maci, Nathan goes instead. Nathan enjoys meeting her and hires her for several more dates where they spend time together and eventually kiss in a hotel room.

They visit Frances' family grave plot and use her father's name to locate his obituary; Frances' married name and her Michigan home are listed there. After finding her Facebook page, Nathan is troubled by Bill's distaste for Frances' husband and his stated desire for Frances to leave her husband and marry him. Nathan hires June, an actress who resembles Frances, to role play what Bill and Frances' reunion meeting might be like. Bill acts inappropriately toward June until Nathan asks Bill and June to switch roles. In the role of Frances, Bill appears to understand that she might harbor some frustration toward him.

Nathan and Bill find Frances' address and fly to Michigan. They park down the street from her house and Nathan encourages Bill to call Frances because arriving with cameras might startle her (and Bill didn't want to meet her without the cameras). During the call, Bill seems frustrated that Frances doesn't recognize his voice. After he tells her his name and they reminisce on memories of their youth, Frances shares that she is a grandmother and is happy with her life. Bill says he was just calling to hear her voice and they end the call pleasantly. After, Bill says that there's no need to go to her home.

Nathan and Bill return to Los Angeles and some time later, Bill gives Nathan a serving platter to thank him for his help. He asks Nathan to connect him with June; when he calls, June recognizes his voice and agrees to meet up for a lunch date. Nathan flies back to Arkansas to meet Maci in a pavilion next to a construction site. Maci gives Nathan her feedback on his show, and they discuss meeting off camera. In the final shot, a drone camera flies away from the couple, revealing the camera crew arranged around them.

== Cast ==
- Nathan Fielder
- Bill Heath
- Cornelius Ladd
- June Conniff
- Richard Ledbetter
- Mary Hollis Inboden as Young Frances (voice)

== Production ==
The episode was co-written by series co-creator and star Nathan Fielder with Leo Allen, Carrie Kemper, Michael Koman, Adam Locke-Norton, and Eric Notarnicola. According to Fielder, when he and his team initially decided to film the search for Frances, "it turned into this two-hour feature-length documentary they aired as a special."

The episode premiered on Comedy Central on November 9, 2017. That the episode was the series finale was not announced until nearly a year after it aired; in October 2018, Comedy Central released a statement that Fielder had decided to end the series.

== Themes and analysis ==
"Finding Frances" speaks to themes of love and regret. Of the episode's themes, Rachel Pickett wrote in The Maneater, "Not only does the episode speak to regret and lost opportunities in love, but it does it in a way that is often shockingly profound and truthful, especially given the medium in which Fielder chooses to tell his stories." Karen Han of The Daily Beast referred to it as "a meditation on love and the passage of time" in a manner similar to Twin Peaks.

Critics discussed how the episode complicates reality television and scripted works within the depiction of Maci and Nathan's relationship; Errol Morris wrote in the New Yorker, "What’s the difference between a bad impersonator and a meta-impersonator? Or between true love and delusion? What makes something real? That we believe in it? That we can convince others to? These questions all come to a head in Fielder’s season finale." Similarly, Cameron R. Flatt of Vox stated, "Whether the entire thing is genuinely real, completely scripted or, most likely, something in between, that’s not the point. Through his attempts to blur the lines of fact and fiction, Fielder himself has lost that line."

== Theatrical screenings ==
On November 9, 2017, Fielder hosted a screening of the episode at the Regency Village Theater. An extended theatrical cut was later screened at the True/False Film Festival with additional unseen footage.

== Reception ==
The episode received universal acclaim. John Hugar of The A.V. Club described it as "likely the best episode in a show full of brilliant ones. It was an unflinching look at regret and one’s refusal to move on and accept that things can’t be changed." He also noted that unlike the other episodes in the series, "Finding Frances" had a much more somber tone. Karen Han referred to it in the Daily Beast as "unquestionably one of the best TV episodes of the year, definitely the best standalone, and perhaps just as worthy of the argument over what counts as TV and what counts as a movie..." Dale Eisinger of Spin described the episode's positioning within the series: "...all four seasons of Nathan for You have built toward this. The only semblance of narrative over the years has been Nathan himself trying to create friendships or romances from his oddball escapades. Nathan, who tends toward an on-screen awkwardness that distances himself from his subjects, often fails at this...But, in the end, the viewer sees how all the gears interlock, and how the entire enterprise seems to be borne of the best intentions."

Errol Morris reviewed the episode in a New Yorker essay, and called the ending "utterly remarkable. I guess you could say that it breaks the fourth wall. But I’m not sure that there’s a fourth wall to be broken here."

"Finding Frances" was named to "Best TV Episodes of 2017" lists by the New York Times, The Ringer, and Vox.
