= George Dupre =

George Dupre (1903–1982) was a Canadian man who falsely claimed to have been a Special Operations Executive operative during World War II.

In 1953, Quentin Reynolds, an ex-war correspondent, had written a book The Man Who Wouldn't Talk about George Dupre's alleged wartime experiences. Dupre claimed that he had been working for Special Operations Executive and the French Resistance during World War II. He had masqueraded as a village idiot and had been captured and tortured by the Gestapo. He had been telling his story in Canadian service clubs and Boy Scout meetings for years. Any loopholes in his story he (and his listeners) attributed to wartime trauma and still existing security restrictions.

Random House published the book and it appeared in November 1953. There was also a Reader's Digest condensation. Dupre himself said he wanted no money, that only the message to trust in God was important. He gave the money to Scouts Canada. The book was a sensation.

The hoax began to unravel when a retired Royal Canadian Air Force officer appeared at the offices of the Calgary Herald. He had served with Dupre in Winnipeg in 1943, when Dupre claimed he was working undercover in France. Three other officers stated that they had sailed with him to Britain at the same time.

Calgary Herald reporter Douglas Collins, himself a former intelligence man, tricked Dupre by dropping fictitious names Dupre claimed to recognize. Eventually Dupre confessed. Reynolds was rather disappointed and Reader's Digest published a three-page retraction. Unfazed, Random House representative Bennett Cerf recommended that stores move the book to the fiction section. The book continued to sell well.
