= Dumb Starbucks =

- Nathan for You episode
- Episode no.: Season 2 Episode 5
- Directed by: Nathan Fielder
- Written by: Nathan Fielder; Michael Koman; Dan Mintz
- Original air date: July 29, 2014
- Running time: 21 minutes

Episode chronology
← Previous "Liquor Store / Exterminator / Car Wash"	Next → "Daddy's Watching / Party Planner"

"Dumb Starbucks" is the fifth episode of the second season of the American television reality television comedy series Nathan for You, and the thirteenth overall episode of the series. Written by series co-creators Nathan Fielder and Michael Koman, as well as Dan Mintz, it first aired on Comedy Central in the United States on July 29, 2014.

In the episode, Fielder attempts to help a struggling coffee shop by renaming it Dumb Starbucks, a parody of the American coffee company and coffeehouse chain. While producing the episode, the actual Dumb Starbucks location provoked real international media coverage. This episode was the second time Nathan for You was the subject of serious coverage from mainstream media outlets, the first being for a video produced for the season 1 episode "Santa/Petting Zoo". The location attracted dozens of visitors before it was allegedly shut down by the Los Angeles County Department of Health Services (LACDHS), an event incorporated into the episode, although the LACDHS has no records of an action against Dumb Starbucks. Spectators and media commentators questioned the stunt's authenticity, viewing it variously as performance art, a statement on consumerism, a viral marketing achievement or the work of street artist Banksy.

Starbucks did not pursue legal action, although it did note to the press that it was "evaluating" the possibility while reinforcing that the "Starbucks" name is a protected trademark. Upon the episode's broadcast, it was acclaimed by television critics.

== Plot ==
Elias Zacklin is the owner of The Helio Cafe, a small coffee shop in East Hollywood, that lacks customers. Fielder meets with Zacklin to discuss how he can compete with bigger coffee chains. His idea is that parody law permits fair use of a company's logos and branding, which should attract their customers. He suggests they change Helio's name to a parody of Starbucks named "Dumb Starbucks". Fielder meets with lawyer Peter J. Marx, who informs him that the legality is not yet sound because individuals could confuse Dumb Starbucks for the famous corporation, unless Fielder has established himself as a parody artist. In a twist, Fielder reveals he has fooled Marx into signing a release form that holds him responsible for any legal damages the stunt may create. Marx refuses to give Fielder the contract back, but Fielder confirms they have video footage of him signing the contract, which will hold up in court. Zacklin and Fielder begin writing parodies of popular songs to perform at an open mic night. Fielder also opens an art gallery containing pieces of visual art mocking popular culture, continuing his quest to become a parody artist.

When tensions with Zacklin arise, he decides to pursue Dumb Starbucks on his own, kicking Zacklin off the project. Renting a vacant retail space in nearby Los Feliz, they begin to construct the shop over the course of a week. Fielder posts a Craigslist ad seeking baristas with Starbucks experience, and hires two applicants. Dumb Starbucks opens to little fanfare, leading Fielder to promote the store in the parking lot of a local Starbucks. The next day, the location becomes a phenomenon, attracting dozens of visitors and international media coverage. Fielder announces plans to open a second location in Brooklyn, New York, but the first store is shut down by the health department. To help him navigate the fiasco, he returns to Zacklin for help, who refuses. Fielder realizes that he has put himself above who he intends to help, and has become what he despises most. Attempting to right his wrongs, he posts a sign on the door of the now-empty former Dumb Starbucks, suggesting visitors instead visit The Helio Cafe.

== Production ==
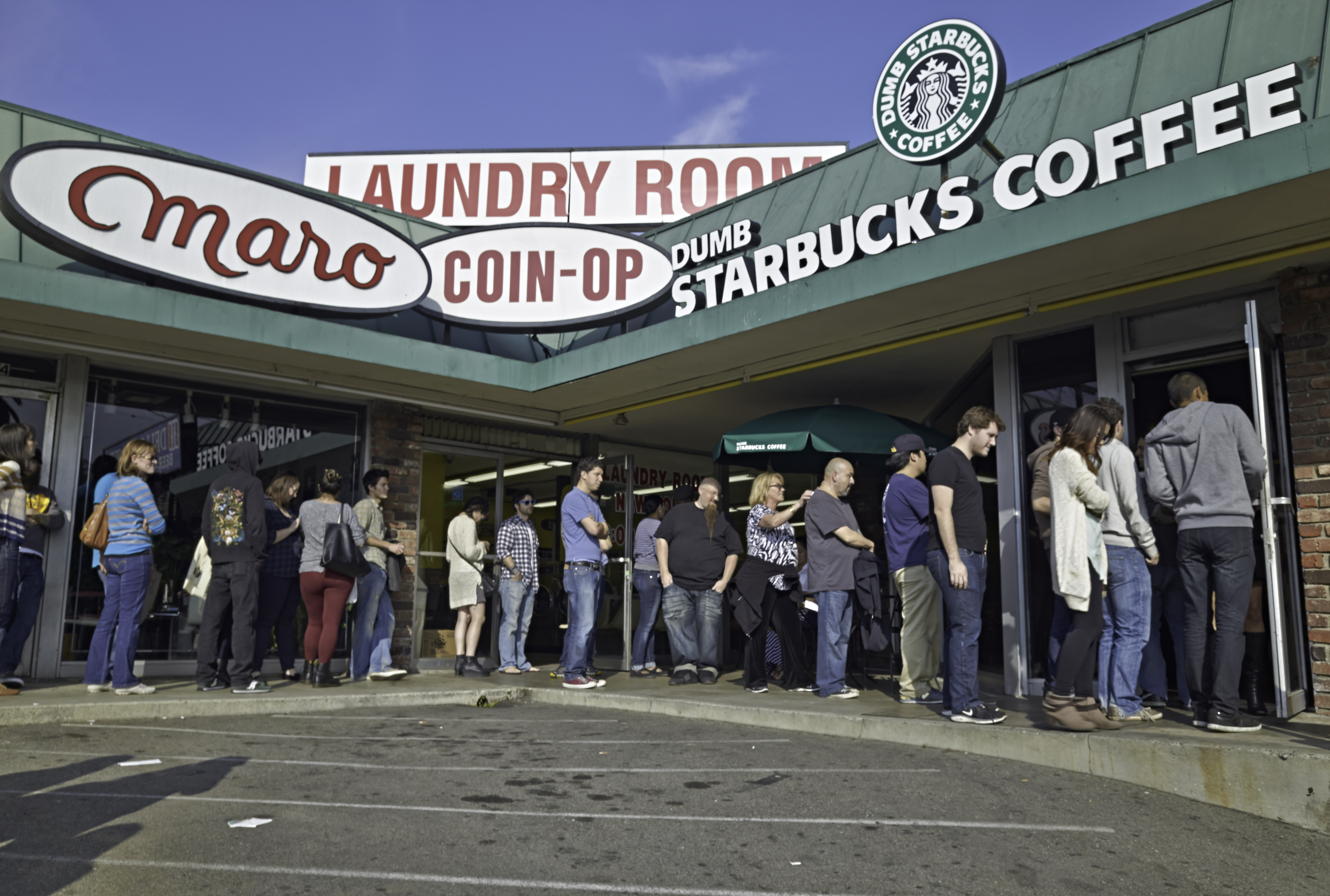
A line outside "Dumb Starbucks" on February 9, 2014.

In producing the second season of Nathan for You, Fielder and the show's writing staff did not intend to produce something that would go viral online. For an episode in the show's first season, they had created a YouTube video, "Pig rescues baby goat", which gained seven million views and news coverage even before the series aired. Fielder did not want to do something similar again; as he later put it, "I'm not into things that feel like a sequel." He and the writing staff thought that the Dumb Starbucks location might attract local news media, but not much else.

Dumb Starbucks opened on February 7, 2014, at 1802 Hillhurst Avenue in Los Feliz, Los Angeles, which they announced via a tweet by an "official" Twitter account. The strip mall also contained a Thai restaurant and a coin-operated laundromat. The location contained items such as "Dumb Espresso" and "Dumb Frappuccino," CDs of Dumb Nora [sic] Jones Duets, and coffee sizes were dumb tall, dumb grande and dumb venti. Bootleggers outside the store sold ten-dollar "Dumb Starbucks" hats and one-dollar stickers. A line outside, composed of curious locals, extended beyond the strip mall. The location did not have a business license or health code rating visible. The popularity of Dumb Starbucks was fueled by social media, and according to USA Today, tweets from visitors revealed they stood in line for an hour to receive the free coffee. The New Yorker noted that visitors protested the store's "horrible coffee."

A reporter from Grantland visited the location, describing it as "madness with a side of possible poignancy." News crews set up cameras in the strip mall's parking lot, but were unable to interview the "mysterious" owner behind Dumb Starbucks. Upon the store's closure at 5:30 p.m., several people in the line began chanting "We want Dumb!" Comment threads online suggested Fielder was behind the prank, and Fielder held a press conference on February 10, confirming that the Dumb Starbucks store was a television stunt. The store was closed later that day by the health department for operating without a permit.

In an email to media outlets, Starbucks confirmed that "We are evaluating next steps and while we appreciate the humor, they cannot use our name, which is a protected trademark." Mark McKenna, a law professor at the University of Notre Dame specializing in trademark law, told USA Today that "My gut tells me a court would be bothered by how much of the Starbucks trademark was used. It's not just the word but they also made the store look just like it." As it turned out, Comedy Central and parent company Viacom escaped legal action from Starbucks.

== Themes ==
For the first time in my life, it felt like people actually wanted to be around me.

— Nathan Fielder, in character, on his newfound fame

"Dumb Starbucks" as a whole explores the fair use of copyrighted material with regards to the art form of parody. Fielder describes the issues involved within the episode, noting that parody "allows you to use trademarks and copyrighted material as long as you're making fun of them." A "frequently asked questions" notice on the window of the location stated that the location was operating as an art gallery and was technically "making fun" of Starbucks as a parodic work of art. "The 'coffee' you're buying is considered the art," read the notice, "but that's for our lawyers to worry about. All you need to do is enjoy our delicious coffee!" Fielder summarized the episode's satirical intent as "a parody about the power of corporate branding."

Outside the scope of the episode, the actual Dumb Starbucks spurred discussion regarding public consumption of art. Spectators questioned the store's authenticity, some of which are depicted in the episode, presuming it to be a political statement on consumerism, or an offshoot of the Occupy Wall Street movement. Many commentators theorized it could be British graffiti artist Banksy, and others simply considered the stunt a successful viral marketing strategy. Dissenters dismissed the store as "too hipster."

The episode features the one recurring narrative in Nathan for You, namely, "...that the underlying motive of these schemes is so Nathan can find friends, find love, and end his loneliness." Robin Hardwick of Entertainment Weekly characterized the episode's ending as a Faustian bargain.

== Cultural references ==
As mentioned, the episode mainly targets Starbucks, and lampoons its merchandise and branding. The Dumb Starbucks store's logo, interior design, color schemes, employee uniforms, menu, and CD offerings all imitate Starbucks.

In his quest to become a parody artist, Fielder suggests they mock the Rolling Stones, due to their age. Among Fielder's musical parodies include spoofs of "Glycerine" by Bush and "Save Tonight" by Eagle-Eye Cherry. Hardwick noted that many of Fielder's parodies consisted of late 1990s popular music. At his art gallery, one piece depicts the logo of Bank of America as a tank, mocking the corporation as "Tank of America". Other parodies include Continental Breakfast Airlines, T.G.I. Fart, Fruit in the Room, 1806 Flags, WoodFellas, and a 76 logo prominently featuring the words "SIXTY-NINE". The episode also incorporates clips from real media coverage of the "Dumb Starbucks" location, including Today, Fox News and Fielder's appearance on Jimmy Kimmel Live!.

== Reception ==
The heavy press coverage of "Dumb Starbucks" attracted new viewers to Nathan for You, and increased Fielder's own public profile considerably. Following the stunt, Comedy Central posted the show's entire first season on their official website for streaming.

The episode received acclaim from television critics. John Teti of The A.V. Club gave the episode an A, writing, "There is no brilliant meaning at the heart of 'Dumb Starbucks' except for the meaning that bystanders bring to it. And that, paradoxically, is the brilliant meaning at the heart of 'Dumb Starbucks.'" Bill Bradley of The Huffington Post called the episode "genius." Ryan Bort of Paste rated the episode a perfect 10/10, commenting, "the 'Dumb Starbucks' episode of Nathan For You more than lived up to the Dumb Starbucks phenomenon." Robin Hardwick of Entertainment Weekly deemed it "almost a game-changer for the whole show." "The much-anticipated 'Dumb Starbucks' episode finally aired last night and not only did it live up to the hype, but it went above and beyond," wrote Pilot Viruet of Flavorwire, summarizing, "It's an impressive episode of television, one that surpassed all expectations and seamlessly incorporated all of the prior media hype that was surrounding it, and just another showcase of why Nathan For You is consistently churning out some of the smartest and funniest comedy on television."

Comedy Central auctioned off the art pieces featured in the episode online on the day following the episode's broadcast.

== The Helio Cafe ==
Soon after the "Dumb Starbucks" episode first aired, owner Elias Zacklin told a reporter that he had let all of his staff go that summer, as he could not afford to pay anyone. According to its business listing on Google Search and the business directory website Yelp, The Helio Cafe permanently closed. The last Yelp customer review for the cafe was posted on March 12, 2016, almost 20 months after the premiere of "Dumb Starbucks".

== See also ==
- Détournement
