= Doug Collins (journalist) =

British-born Canadian journalist (1920–2001)

Reginald Douglas Collins (8 September 1920 – 29 September 2001) was a British-born Canadian journalist and Holocaust denier who was frequently accused of racism and antisemitism.

== Military service ==
At the start of World War II he joined the British Army. As a sergeant in the Gloucestershire Regiment, he was captured in the Battle of Dunkirk in 1940, later being awarded the Military Medal for bravery during this campaign.

During his four years as a prisoner of war, he made no fewer than ten escape attempts. He was able to escape from a German POW camp in Silesia and stealthily made his way to Hungary. After being captured there, he made another daring escape, this time making his way to Romania. There he was imprisoned once again, but when Romania capitulated in 1944, he was freed and returned to Britain, serving in combat with British forces in northwest Europe during the war's final months.

The exact nature of his exploits while a POW have not been without controversy, however, with some questioning the veracity of his numerous escapes from Nazi-controlled prisons.

From 1946 to 1950, Collins worked as a political intelligence officer with the British Control Commission's de-nazification department in Germany.

== Journalist ==
Collins emigrated to Canada in 1952 and worked for several decades as a reporter or columnist for several Western Canadian newspapers including the Calgary Herald, Vancouver Sun and Vancouver Province.

In November 1953, Collins, while working for the Calgary Herald, exposed George Dupre's claims of being a war-time spy as a hoax. The disclosure came soon after publication of The Man Who Wouldn't Talk, a book about Dupre by American journalist Quentin Reynolds.

The following spring, in 1954, Collins testified on behalf of Westbrook Pegler in the case of Reynolds v. Pegler, a defamation case arising from comments written in 1949 by Pegler against Reynolds. Collins gave evidence as to Reynolds's reputation as a writer, arising from Reynolds's book about Dupre. Reynolds's counsel, Louis Nizer, attacked Collins's credibility during cross-examination for his failure to give credit to other sources of evidence that exposed Dupre. Another witness from Calgary felt compelled to testify on behalf of Reynolds to counter Collins's testimony.

In 1960, eight trade unions sued Collins for libel when he was the Vancouver Sun's labour reporter. The same year, the newspaper's managing editor, Erwin Swangard, fired Collins for his outside freelance work. Collins successfully sued for wrongful dismissal. He was reinstated and returned to work after four months. He collected his back pay, walked into the editor's office and quit and then went to personnel to demand holiday pay. In 1963, he sued Reader's Digest for libel and won.

Collins returned to the Vancouver Sun in the 1970s. He quit for the last time when then-publisher Clark Davey tried to restrict his freelancing.

Collins worked as an interviewer/editorialist for CBC Television in Vancouver from 1958 to 1968. From 1981 to 1985, he was the news director/talk show host for CJOR radio in Vancouver.

In 1980, during Terry Fox's Marathon of Hope, Collins wrote a story falsely claiming that, rather than running a daily marathon, Fox actually had been driven in a car across Quebec.

Since last leaving the Vancouver Sun, Collins also worked for the Vancouver Courier, the Columbian (a newspaper formerly published in New Westminster, B.C.), and CKVU-TV. Between 1983 and 1997, Collins wrote a column for the North Shore News, a small weekly community paper in North Vancouver, B.C.

== Awards ==
Collins was the recipient of two awards for journalism. He received the National Newspaper Award (1953) for his report on Dupre. He received the MacMillan Bloedel Award (1975) for reports on alleged corruption at UBC.

In 1993 he was awarded the 125th Anniversary of the Confederation of Canada Medal, given to approximately 42,000 Canadians "who have made a significant contribution to their fellow citizens, their community, or to Canada."

== Politics ==
Collins was acclaimed on 18 October 1988 as the Reform Party of Canada's candidate for the Capilano—Howe Sound electoral district in the 1988 federal election.

The party leader, Preston Manning, had vowed not to sign Collins' nomination papers unless he first agreed to sign a pledge that he supported the party's position against racism. Collins refused to sign the pledge. Manning rejected Collins' nomination papers, saying he was concerned Collins' candidacy might have a negative effect on the party's fortunes in other ridings.

== Accusations of racism and antisemitism ==
During his 14-year association with the North Shore News, Collins wrote regular columns against immigration and ethnic minorities in Canada. His writings became increasingly controversial and led to accusations of racism and antisemitism. In 1997, a complaint against him was brought before the British Columbia Human Rights Commission for a column in which Collins questioned the Holocaust and denounced Schindler's List, which he derided as "Swindler's List," as propaganda. The case was dismissed.

A further complaint was laid in 1999 citing four of his columns, including the column raised in the previous complaint. This one was upheld, and Collins and his publisher were ordered to pay $2,000 in damages. The complaint was upheld upon appeal.

Vancouver-based jacket company Taiga praised Collins in one of their winter catalogues, inspiring comedian Nathan Fielder to start a jacket company, Summit Ice Apparel, that promotes Holocaust awareness and donates its proceeds to the Vancouver Holocaust Education Centre.

== Author ==
Collins's first book, P.O.W., published in 1968, was his account of his experiences as a prisoner of war during World War II. It included a foreword by Douglas Bader.

Beginning in 1979, he wrote several more books, primarily dealing with his views on immigration, culture and society, and later on his fight over the human rights complaint against him.

== Bibliography ==
- The best and worst of Doug Collins, Whitecap Books, 1987
- Here we go again!, Colpress, 1998
- Immigration: the destruction of English Canada, BMG Pub., 1979
- Immigration: Parliament versus the people, Citizens for Foreign Aid Reform, 1987, c1984
- P.O.W.: A Soldier's Story of His Ten Escapes from Nazi Prison Camps, Simon & Schuster of Canada, 1969, c1968
