= The Rehearsal (TV series) =

American comedy television series

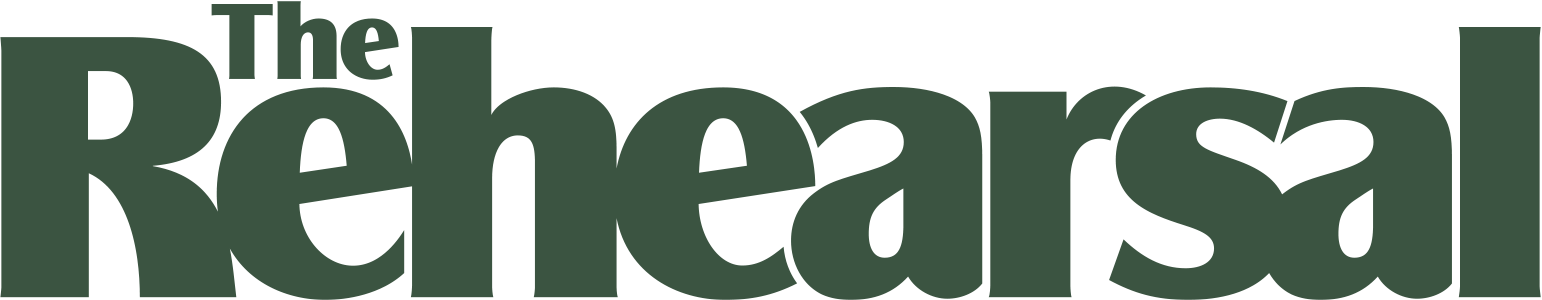
- Genre: Comedy
- Created by: Nathan Fielder
- Written by: Nathan Fielder; Carrie Kemper; Eric Notarnicola; Adam Locke-Norton
- Directed by: Nathan Fielder
- Starring: Nathan Fielder
- Country of origin: United States
- Original language: English
- No. of seasons: 2
- No. of episodes: 12

Production
- Executive producers: Nathan Fielder; Christie Smith; Clark Reinking; Dan McManus; Dave Paige; Eric Notarnicola
- Running time: 27–58 minutes
- Production company: Blow Out Productions

Original release
- Network: HBO
- Release: July 15, 2022 – present

The Rehearsal is an American docu-comedy television series created, written, directed by and starring Nathan Fielder. It premiered on HBO on July 15, 2022, to critical acclaim. It was renewed for a second season in August 2022, which premiered on April 20, 2025.

== Premise ==
The Rehearsal features Nathan Fielder, as a fictionalized version of himself, helping ordinary people rehearse upcoming difficult conversations or life events through the use of sets and actors hired to recreate real situations. The situations can be trivial, like confessing to a lie about educational history, or more complex, like raising a child. Fielder commissions extravagant sets with every detail recreated, and hires actors to inhabit these sets and practice different dialogue trees with his clients dozens of times to try to prepare them for every variable. Information used to train the actors and build the sets is often collected without the subjects' knowledge (this aspect is often played for comedic effect).

== Production ==
The premise for The Rehearsal developed from Fielder's series Nathan for You. In preparation for the earlier series, Fielder and his team role-played scenarios to predict how real people might react to his ridiculous suggestions, an exercise that often proved inaccurate. Fielder was inspired by the futility of the human impulse to control one's own future, which he found "really funny."

Some of the humor in The Rehearsal is derived from its extravagant sets. In the first episode, Fielder constructs a perfect duplicate of the bar in which the subject's difficult conversation is to take place. He also constructs a duplicate of the subject's house to practice their first conversation.

In the second season, Fielder constructed a large-scale replica of George Bush Intercontinental Airport on a soundstage in California, expanding the show's use of meticulously detailed simulations. The production team recreated portions of the airport after being unable to film extensively in restricted areas of the real terminal, opting instead to build a controlled environment that could accommodate repeated rehearsals and filming. The replica included airport lounges, restaurants, signage, and staff areas, and functioned as the primary setting for a season-long storyline centered on airline communication and pilot coordination. The airport set was later repurposed within the series as "Nathan's Airport", a simulated travel environment for neurodivergent participants, including children with autism, allowing them to rehearse navigating the sensory and social demands of air travel in a controlled setting. Airport officials in Houston publicly expressed intrigue at the project, noting the unusual degree of fidelity with which their facility was recreated for the series.

In regards to a third season, HBO CEO Casey Bloys stated in September 2025: "He's got an idea, I believe. He's thinking about something, he's turning something over [in] his head, so when he's ready to do it, we'll do it because I think he is a comic genius." In January and September 2026, Fielder was still said to be developing ideas for a third season.

== Release ==
The series was first teased in 2019 as part of Fielder's deal with HBO. The title The Rehearsal was revealed in June 2021. In June 2022, a teaser was released, and a poster showing a release date of July 15, 2022.

== Episodes ==
Season	Episodes	Originally released	
Season	Episodes	First released	Last released
1	6	July 15, 2022	August 19, 2022
2	6	April 20, 2025	May 25, 2025

=== Season 1 (2022) ===
No. overall	No. in season	Title	Directed by	Written by	Original release date	US viewers (millions)
1	1	"Orange Juice, No Pulp"	Nathan Fielder	Nathan Fielder	July 15, 2022	0.055
Nathan Fielder helps Kor Skeete, a trivia-obsessed New Yorker who wants to confess to his bar trivia team that he lied about having a master's degree. Nathan reveals an elaborate method of rehearsals involving an actor (K. Todd Freeman) playing a "fake Kor". To help Kor rehearse the difficult conversation with his friend Tricia, Nathan creates simulations of trivia night with a fake Tricia in a full-scale replica of the Alligator Lounge, a Brooklyn bar. Worried that Kor may panic and not confess if he fails at trivia, Nathan stages the questions to ensure Kor will win without his knowledge. Kor overcomes his fears and makes his confession to the real Tricia, who responds with understanding. Afterwards, Nathan seems to express his deception about the trivia questions to Kor, only for it to be yet another rehearsal with Freeman, who, as Kor, scolds Nathan for ruining his big night. Nathan ultimately does not tell Kor the truth, instead just complimenting him before going to drink in the replica of the Alligator Lounge.
2	2	"Scion"	Nathan Fielder	Nathan Fielder, Carrie Kemper & Eric Notarnicola	July 22, 2022	0.056
Nathan develops a rehearsal for Angela, a woman considering motherhood. Nathan hires child actors to simulate adopting and caring for a baby and sets her up in a rented farmhouse in rural Oregon. Due to Oregon child protection laws, Nathan's team must covertly switch out the baby every four hours and replace it with a robot baby at night. Seeking a simulated husband, Angela dates Robbin, a numerology-obsessed man who wants to have sex with Angela despite her devout Christian beliefs against premarital sex. When Robbin quits the project due to the robot baby's incessant crying, Nathan inserts himself into the experiment as Angela's non-romantic co-parent.
3	3	"Gold Digger"	Nathan Fielder	Nathan Fielder, Carrie Kemper & Eric Notarnicola	July 29, 2022	0.117
Nathan and Angela accelerate their parenting rehearsal with three-year-old, then six-year-old actors portraying their fake son, "Adam". Angela refuses to participate in Halloween due to her belief in Satanic conspiracies. Nathan balances parenting duties with a rehearsal for Patrick, a man who wants to confront his brother over their late grandfather's will, which bans Patrick from inheriting money if he is dating a "gold digger". The rehearsal occurs in a replica Raising Cane's restaurant in a warehouse next to the relocated Alligator Lounge. To introduce real emotions to the rehearsal, Nathan stages a scenario to convince Patrick that he could inherit buried gold from the grandfather of Isaac, the actor who plays Patrick's brother. After Patrick has an emotional breakthrough during a rehearsal, he leaves the production and never returns. Nathan narrates that he is envious that self-deception is easy for some people as he ponders his fake family.
4	4	"The Fielder Method"	Nathan Fielder	Nathan Fielder, Carrie Kemper & Eric Notarnicola	August 5, 2022	0.087
To recruit actors for his rehearsals, Nathan opens an acting studio in Los Angeles, teaching "the Fielder Method", which involves covertly observing and imitating unaware subjects. Feeling insecure about his own performance, Nathan reenacts the class with actors and a fake Nathan as the teacher while the real Nathan plays the role of Thomas, a student. Nathan makes his students immerse themselves in other people's lives while he immerses himself in Thomas's life, even living in Thomas's home. Nathan returns to Oregon, where his "son", Adam, is now a teenager. Nathan and Joshua, the actor playing Adam, decide that Adam should lash out due to resentment of his absentee father and develop a drug problem, a situation that mirrors Angela's own past. Adam suffers an overdose and is tended to by emergency responders played by Thomas and another Fielder Method graduate. After he runs away from home, the 15-year-old Adam reverts to a 6-year-old since Nathan plans to relive his son's earlier years.
5	5	"Apocalypto"	Nathan Fielder	Nathan Fielder, Carrie Kemper & Eric Notarnicola	August 12, 2022	0.069
Nathan decides to practice his own assertiveness in relationships by challenging Angela over their son's religious upbringing. Angela, a fervent Christian, refuses to allow Adam to be raised in Nathan's Jewish faith, so Nathan secretly brings his son to lessons with a tutor in Judaism under the pretense of swimming lessons. Seeking solace outside the house, Nathan opens his replica Alligator Lounge to the public under the name Nate's Lizard Lounge. The co-parents argue over a comedy skit featuring six-year-old Adam as "Dr. Fart" and a joke about eating feces, which Angela claims is a Satanic practice. Nathan rehearses the confrontations with a fake Angela, and in one scenario, she harshly criticizes Nathan's emotional detachment and questions the ethics of the entire production. However, in their real final confrontation, Angela simply decides to quit the rehearsal. Nathan continues to raise Adam, now as a single parent.
6	6	"Pretend Daddy"	Nathan Fielder	Nathan Fielder, Carrie Kemper & Eric Notarnicola	August 19, 2022	0.117
Nathan stages a ninth birthday party for Adam, but faces a problem when Remy, one of the child actors who played Adam at age six, becomes attached to Nathan, calling him "daddy" even after his scenes are over. Remy's mother explains that her son might have trouble understanding the difference between acting and reality. To discover what went wrong, Nathan repeats Remy's scenes with different actors including Liam (a nine-year-old Adam actor), an adult actor, and a mannequin. He then explores what might have happened if Angela had stayed with him and meets with the real Angela, who urges him to forgive himself, as her religious beliefs state. In an attempt to truly understand the connection between parent and child, Nathan stages a new scenario in which he is Remy's mother Amber and Liam portrays Remy. They re-create the experience of appearing on The Rehearsal and becoming attached to "pretend daddy" Nathan. After coming to the emotional realization that they should not have done the show, Nathan as Amber seemingly breaks character and tells the fake Remy, "I'm your dad."

=== Season 2 (2025) ===
No. overall	No. in season	Title	Directed by	Written by	Original release date	US viewers (millions)
7	1	"Gotta Have Fun"	Nathan Fielder	Nathan Fielder, Carrie Kemper, Adam Locke-Norton & Eric Notarnicola	April 20, 2025	0.129
Nathan Fielder studies airliner black box transcripts in which the first officer feels too intimidated to challenge the captain, leading to fatal crashes due to pilot error. He discusses this with John Goglia, a former National Transportation Safety Board member, who had once recommended roleplay simulation to improve pilot communication. Nathan considers the dilemma of balancing his "somewhat sincere" effort to improve air safety against expectations that he is making a comedy show. Nathan meets with Moody, an airline first officer who is willing to participate in simulations. When his film crew is denied entry at a terminal while shadowing Moody at work, Nathan builds a partial re-creation of the George Bush Intercontinental Airport terminal, staffed with actors who use the Fielder Method to imitate real employees. There, Moody role-plays interactions with an actor playing a captain. To test Moody's assertiveness, Nathan arranges a conversation between Moody and his girlfriend Cindy, a Starbucks barista whom he worries is being hit on by customers. They confront their relationship issues in a simulated cockpit with Cindy dressed as a captain, an exercise which ends awkwardly.
8	2	"Star Potential"	Nathan Fielder	Nathan Fielder, Carrie Kemper, Adam Locke-Norton & Eric Notarnicola	April 27, 2025	0.111
Nathan creates Wings of Voice, a fake singing competition show to test airline co-pilots by asking them to judge and reject auditioning contestants. The scenario is inspired by an emotionally taxing job Nathan himself once performed as a junior producer on Canadian Idol. After Nathan asks the rejected contestants to rate their judges' performance, he tries to emulate Mara'D, the co-pilot with the highest likeability score. Mara'D demonstrates her ability to deflect unwanted personal attention from Jeff, a captain who has been banned from numerous dating apps. Nathan also explores his own failure to assertively confront the streaming service Paramount+ over their removal of the second episode of the third season of Nathan for You due to the inclusion of Summit Ice Apparel and their classification of antisemitism as a "sensitive" topic after the Gaza war began in 2023. To continue his attempts at performing sincerity, Nathan gives an inspiring speech to a teenage girl who was rejected at the audition.
9	3	"Pilot's Code"	Nathan Fielder	Nathan Fielder, Carrie Kemper, Adam Locke-Norton & Eric Notarnicola	May 4, 2025	0.085
Nathan helps Bogdan and Monique, a couple who have cloned their late dog Achilles, but are unsatisfied that the clones behave differently. Nathan places the cloned dogs into a re-creation of the original Achilles' 2011-era upbringing. Applying this concept to human behavior, Nathan uses himself as a test subject to replicate the personality of heroic pilot Sully Sullenberger. In a simulation that Nathan acknowledges may seem "weird," he relives portions of Sully's life from infancy, created with oversized sets, puppets, stilt-walking actors, and robots. Knowing that pilots often avoid mental health diagnoses out of fear of losing their license, Nathan examines passages from Sully's memoir, claiming that Sully likely avoided discussing his emotional struggles and listened to music on his iPod to cope with repressed emotions. Nathan presents a theory that Sully could have been listening to "Bring Me to Life" by one of his favorite bands Evanescence during the "Miracle on the Hudson" landing.
10	4	"Kissme"	Nathan Fielder	Nathan Fielder, Carrie Kemper, Adam Locke-Norton & Eric Notarnicola	May 11, 2025	0.102
To explore interpersonal communication with pilots, Nathan begins a project around Colin, a first officer who finds dating awkward. Nathan introduces an exercise he calls "The Pack" in which a crowd of actors surround Colin and mimic his actions as he goes through simulations of romantic encounters. Nathan secretly encourages actors in the pack to pursue Colin in real life if they have a genuine attraction. Colin goes on a date with one of the actresses named Emma, and Nathan creates five copies of Colin's apartment while casting actors to rehearse their relationship. The actor couples are encouraged to improvise kissing, aided by an intimacy coordinator. When Colin and Emma's relationship stalls over reading the signals for a first kiss, Nathan casts them in a fictional scene that ends with a kiss, explaining that the artifice of acting gives people permission to do things they normally would not. This culminates in Colin kissing Emma (albeit on the cheek).
11	5	"Washington"	Nathan Fielder	Nathan Fielder, Carrie Kemper, Adam Locke-Norton & Eric Notarnicola	May 18, 2025	0.079
Nathan rehearses a hearing of the Congressional Subcommittee on Aviation, where he presents his findings on pilot communication. As a comedian, Nathan struggles with appearing serious to Congress, so he decides to emphasize online discourse about how season one of The Rehearsal resonated with the autistic experience. He hopes to secure a meeting with Congressman Steve Cohen, an autism advocate and Ranking Member of the Aviation Subcommittee. Nathan ingratiates himself with Doreen Granpeesheh of the Center for Autism and Related Disorders to position himself as a "thought leader" in the field, though he tries to deflect any implication that he himself may be autistic. Going into Congressman Cohen's office without rehearsing, Nathan proposes that pilots should participate in an acting exercise before each flight, which would psychologically give permission for first officers to speak up in the event of a crisis. Cohen is not convinced, and suggests that such exercises should be left at the discretion of individual airlines.
12	6	"My Controls"	Nathan Fielder	Nathan Fielder, Carrie Kemper, Adam Locke-Norton & Eric Notarnicola	May 25, 2025	0.088
Over the course of two years, Nathan obtains a commercial pilot's license and trains in a simulator to fly a Boeing 737. Though he is not experienced enough to obtain the license to operate airline flights, with a commercial rating Nathan is allowed to fly passengers and recruits a full cabin of actors willing to simulate a regularly scheduled airline flight. Because pilots must disclose mental health conditions, Nathan undergoes a fMRI brain scan to potentially detect anxiety and autism. Fearing that his flight might be canceled, Nathan claims to not have those conditions before learning his test results. To document problems with pilot communication, Nathan films himself in the cockpit with his first officer Aaron, an experienced pilot with aspirations to be a TV producer. Nathan successfully pilots the 737 from San Bernardino International Airport to the Nevada border and back, emerging to applause from the actors. Nathan later attempted to brand the flight as "The Miracle over the Mojave". Later, Nathan shares that he has been occasionally working as a ferry pilot for an aviation transport company relocating 737s around the world and seemingly declining to learn the results of his brain scan. He claims to be fine because "no one is allowed in the cockpit if there's something wrong with them."

== Reception ==
=== Critical response ===
The series has received critical acclaim, with some praising it as one of the best new series of 2022. For the first season, the review aggregator website Rotten Tomatoes reported a 95% approval rating based on 59 critic reviews, with an average rating of 9.4/10. The website's critics consensus reads, "The Rehearsal gives Nathan Fielder carte blanche to take his absurdist comedy to the limit, which he pushes even further past with deadpan aplomb in what might be his most uncomfortably funny feat yet." Metacritic, which uses a weighted average, assigned a score of 86 out of 100 based on 23 critics, indicating "universal acclaim".

The Rehearsal appeared in the top ten on numerous publications' "Best of 2022" lists, including first for IndieWire, The Ringer, and ScreenCrush, among others.

For the second season, Rotten Tomatoes reported a 98% approval rating based on 46 critic reviews, with an average rating of 9.0/10. The website's critics consensus reads, "Never fear, Nathan Fielder is here to solve air travel safety and further his frustrated quest for human connection in a second Rehearsal that's just as audacious, cringey, and uproariously funny as the first." Metacritic assigned a score of 88 out of 100 based on 22 critics, indicating "universal acclaim".

=== Analysis ===
In The New York Times Critic's Pick review, James Poniewozik wrote that "the show has a philosophical core: Is it ever possible to truly understand another person?" Vox's Alissa Wilkinson likewise called the show "an excellent reminder that we know much less about others than we think we do," and compared it to the writings of Leslie Jamison and Martin Buber.

The show's blurring of simulation and reality have drawn comparisons to the Charlie Kaufman film Synecdoche, New York and the Tom McCarthy novel Remainder. The series has been described as a spiritual successor to Nathan for You, since both shows share a premise of Fielder helping average people in humorous ways. Vulture described Fielder's "willingness to screw with people" and put them in situations that might embarrass them or cause them to do things that are out of character being the core thread of his work.

In a review for The New Yorker, critic Richard Brody characterized the show as disingenuous, taking this "willingness to screw with people" too far. Brody contended that while Fielder is focused on exerting control over his subjects, his "cruel and arrogant gaze" overshadows the series' comedic and dramatic elements. However, Brody embraced moments in season 2 as achieving true artistic excellence.

Many critics viewed the show as a critique of the exploitive and disingenuous nature of reality television, with writer Israel Daramola of Los Angeles Review of Books calling it "a commentary on ... the inherent phoniness of reality television as well as the faults and constrictions of acting as representation of real life."

The series' central idea of rehearsing and performing social interactions resonated with many autistic viewers, who viewed it as an analogy for masking. Variety writer Daniel D'Addario highlighted the series' ultimate message that "all of us are performing, all the time." Fielder references the article in season two.

=== Accolades ===
Accolades received by The Rehearsal
Award	Year	Category	Nominee(s)	Result	Ref.
Cinema Eye Honors	2022	Heterodox Award	Nathan Fielder	Nominated	
Gotham Independent Film Awards	2022	Breakthrough Nonfiction Series	Nathan Fielder, Dave Paige, Dan McManus, and Christie Smith	Nominated	
Independent Spirit Awards	2023	Best New Non-Scripted or Documentary Series	Nathan Fielder, Dave Paige, Dan McManus, Christie Smith, Carrie Kemper, and Eric Notarnicola	Won	
Primetime Emmy Awards	2025	Outstanding Directing for a Comedy Series	Nathan Fielder (for "Pilot's Code")	Nominated	
Primetime Emmy Awards	2025	Outstanding Writing for a Comedy Series	Nathan Fielder, Carrie Kemper, Adam Locke-Norton, and Eric Notarnicola (for "Pilot's Code")	Nominated	
Primetime Creative Arts Emmy Awards	2025	Outstanding Picture Editing for a Single-Camera Comedy Series	Adam Locke-Norton (for "My Controls")	Nominated	
Primetime Creative Arts Emmy Awards	2025	Outstanding Picture Editing for a Single-Camera Comedy Series	Stacy Moon (for "Pilot's Code")	Nominated	
Television Critics Association Awards	2023	Outstanding Achievement in Reality Programming	The Rehearsal	Nominated	
