= Cry Wolfe =

American television show (2014–2016)

- Written by: Peter Field; Paul Haddad; Dustin Rubin
- Directed by: Jeffrey R. Daniels; Paul Haddad
- Creative director: Derek Owen
- Starring: Brian S. Wolfe; Janine McCarthy
- Composer: Russell E Bell
- Country of origin: United States
- Original language: English
- No. of seasons: 3
- No. of episodes: 40

Production
- Executive producers: Chaney Moon; Kelly McPherson; Emre Sahin; Sarah Wetherbee; Paul Haddad; Pamela Deutsch
- Producers: Lisa Lumar; Louis Faldetta; Jill Rytie Lutz
- Cinematography: Christian Ortega
- Running time: 22 minutes
- Production company: Karga Seven Pictures

Original release
- Release: June 3, 2014 – October 4, 2016

Cry Wolfe is an American television show created for Investigation Discovery. It aired for three seasons, from 2014 to 2016.

== Plot ==
Cry Wolfe uses actors to reenact some of private investigator Brian Wolfe's most interesting cases. His cases include cheating spouses, workplace theft, and blackmail. Wolfe is helped by his investigative assistant, Janine McCarthy.

== Production ==
Wolfe was initially hired to work as a private investigator in several episodes of Nathan for You. After his appearance, he was contacted by Karga Seven Pictures who were looking to do a show about an LA private investigator. Wolfe provides his case files to the production company who choose which cases they want to use.

== Reception ==
Brian Lowry from Variety considered the show's presentation style to be deceptive and misleading, using shaky hand-held video and a "faux camera crew" to give the impression that the footage was not a reenactment. Others enjoyed the more "playful" take on the topic, in contrast to the other true crime shows on Investigation Discovery.
