= Michael Koman =

American comedy writer

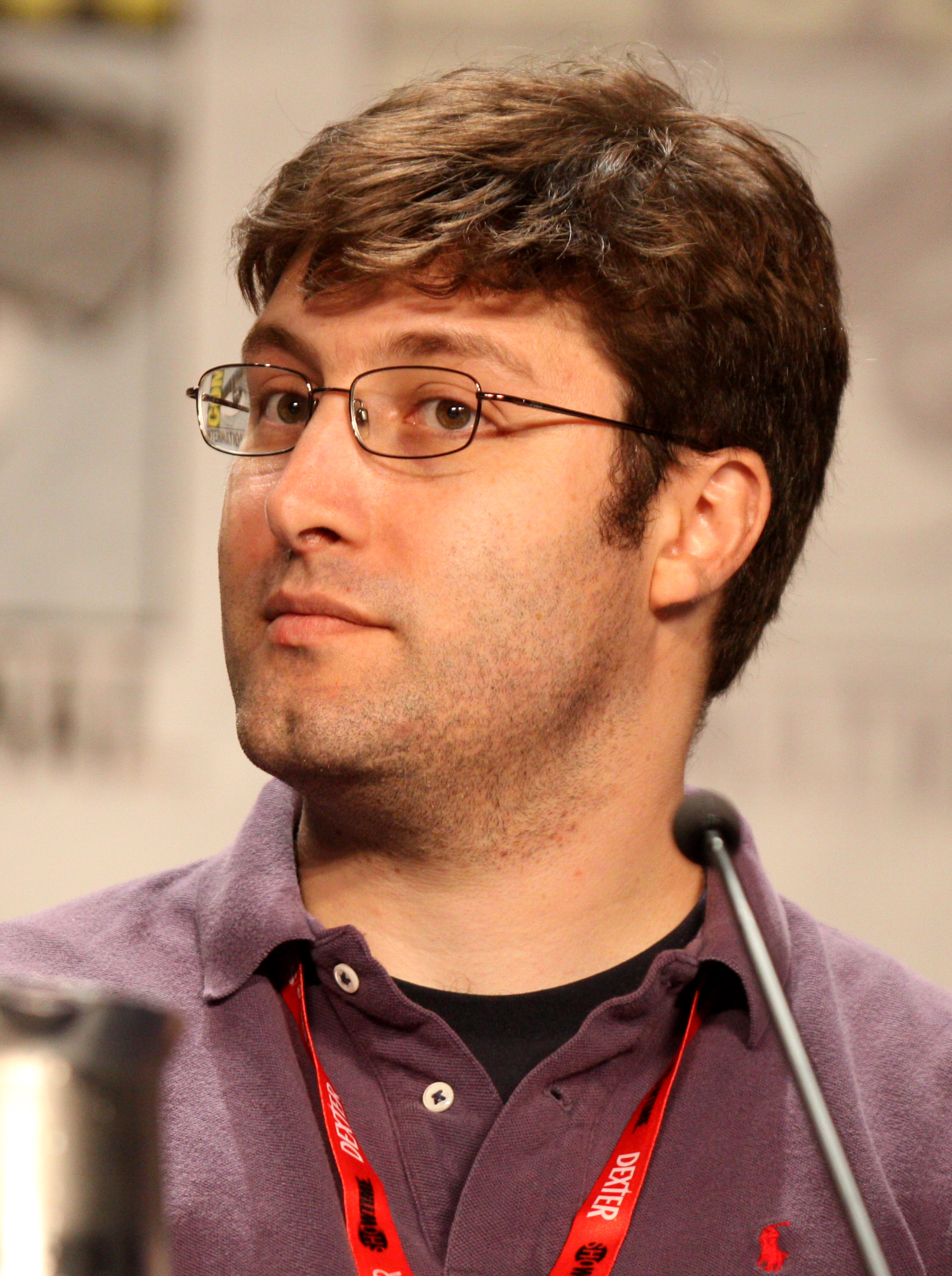
- Koman at the 2011 San Diego Comic-Con
- Occupations: Writer, comedian
- Years active: 1999–present
- Known for: Late Night with Conan O'Brien; Nathan for You
- Spouse: Ellie Kemper (m. 2012)
- Children: 2

Michael Koman is an American comedian and television writer and producer. His notable credits include writing for Late Night with Conan O'Brien for seven years, and serving as co-creator, writer, and executive producer for Nathan for You, which aired for four seasons.

== Early life ==
Koman grew up in San Diego and developed a strong interest in comedy from a young age. His early outlets for this interest included the sketch comedy show SCTV, which he watched enthusiastically; the collection of classic vinyl comedy albums held at UCSD's library, to which he listened extensively; and The Comedy Store club near his home in La Jolla, where he secured an after-school job while he was still in high school. This job led to Koman performing his own short stand-up sets.

Koman's screenwriting career began with a job submitting sketches for MADtv. This opportunity materialized in 1999 after Koman, who was attending college in Los Angeles and occasionally performing at The Improv there, wrote and produced with his friend and fellow comic Todd Glass a sketch show called "Todd's Coma". Veteran comic actor Fred Willard appeared in the show, staged at the HBO Workspace (now the National Comedy Theatre), and Willard's manager later sent a tape on Koman's behalf to MADtv, whose producers were seeking to hire young writing talent.

== Career ==
=== Late Night with Conan O'Brien ===
While at MADtv, Koman worked closely with Greg Cohen, who had written previously for Late Night with Conan O'Brien. On Cohen's recommendation, Koman was hired to write for O'Brien's show. Between 2001 and 2008, Koman collaborated with fellow Late Night writers including Brian Stack and Andrew Weinberg, helping to create recurring characters and bits such as "The Interrupter" and "Hannigan the Traveling Salesman". He also developed the concept behind the frequently reprised "Walker, Texas Ranger Lever" and spearheaded a parody of Aaron Sorkin's Studio 60 on the Sunset Strip called "Studio 6A" (in reference to Conan's television studio in 30 Rockefeller Plaza), thus satirizing a program that was itself dramatizing a fictional version of the often satirical show Saturday Night Live. When the show filmed a special episode in Finland following the discovery of O'Brien's rabid fan base there, Koman and Weinberg, together with head writer Mike Sweeney, accompanied the host and helped generate the material.

During his tenure at Late Night, Koman also occasionally appeared in on-air sketches. In one sketch, he played an accountant for the show who proposed a nonsensical solution to the gay marriage debate. In another sketch, on May 16, 2007, O'Brien confronted Koman at home after the latter had called in sick to work. Koman was ultimately dragged into the studio for the live taping and publicly humiliated (with his obviously willing participation). Koman's future wife Ellie Kemper also worked on the show. Around the time of the release of the first-generation of Apple's iPhone in 2007, Late Night ran a fake advertisement purporting to show how multifunctional the new device was, with Koman and Kemper appearing together in this sketch.

=== Post-Late Night ===
In 2008, Koman left Late Night with the approaching transition in NBC's late-night programming that would in the following year launch the short-lived and tumultuous Tonight Show with Conan O'Brien. Koman, reluctant to relocate with the rest of the Late Night staff from New York City to Los Angeles, accepted the role of head writer for Important Things with Demetri Martin. Martin was another alumnus of the Late Night writing staff, and Koman viewed the new role as an opportunity to challenge himself with greater responsibility and outside the familiar confines of Rockefeller Center. After a brief stint writing for The Colbert Report in August 2008, Koman began work on Martin's show. Among the writers soon hired there was Nathan Fielder, with whom Koman quickly formed another writing partnership.

Koman's next original TV series had him reviving his former writing partnership with Weinberg and teaming up with director Jason Woliner. Eagleheart, starring Chris Elliott as an outlandish US Marshal modeled in part on the titular hero of Walker, Texas Ranger, ran on Adult Swim for three seasons (2011–2014) and was backed by O'Brien's production company Conaco.

Toward the end of his direct involvement with Eagleheart, which concluded with his co-writing of its third and final season, Koman turned his attention to work on Nathan for You. Fielder had been solicited by Comedy Central to develop a pilot and had invited Koman to resume their working relationship. The concept for the show eventually coalesced around the pitching of business strategies to small companies; citing Fielder's education in business management, the show would invest heavily in unique and elaborate schemes to improve the popularity or profitability of its star's clients and would document all the consequences of such intervention. Although the show's ideas and the approaches Fielder (or his persona) took in each episode were planned by a team of writers led by Fielder and Koman (and later Carrie Kemper, Koman's sister-in-law), scripted jokes were mostly eschewed (outside of Fielder's intermittent voiceover narration). Fielder called an end to the show after its fourth season, which was broadcast in 2017.

During the run of Nathan for You, Koman helped create and write for The Jack and Triumph Show, starring Jack McBrayer and Triumph the Insult Comic Dog, a puppet voiced and operated by Robert Smigel. The multi-camera sitcom was inspired by a remote segment filmed at Chicago's The Wieners Circle for the TBS instantiation of O'Brien's late night talk show (called simply Conan). The show comprised seven episodes that all aired in 2015. Koman was also involved in Triumph's Election Watch 2016, produced by Funny or Die.

Following the end of Nathan for You, Koman returned to New York, where he began writing for Saturday Night Live during the summer of 2017. In so doing, he earned his ninth Emmy Award nomination for his contributions to variety show writing ensembles. He previously won the award once, as a member of the Late Night writing team in 2007. He has also won six Writers Guild of America awards throughout his career.

In 2025, Koman co-created and co-wrote 3 episodes of The Paper with Greg Daniels.

== Personal life ==
Koman married actress and comedian Ellie Kemper on July 7, 2012. The two had met backstage at Late Night with Conan O'Brien and had even appeared together in at least one sketch. Kemper shared the story of their engagement on The Ellen DeGeneres Show in early 2012. While Koman is Jewish, the couple has two sons, born in 2016 and 2019 respectively, whom they are raising according to Kemper's Roman Catholic faith.
