= Leo Allen =

American stand-up comedian and writer (born 1972)

- Born: Leopold Rufus Allen; July 5, 1972 (age 54); Massachusetts, U.S.
- Occupations: Stand-up comedian, writer

Leopold Rufus "Leo" Allen (born July 5, 1972) is an American stand-up comedian and writer from Detroit, Michigan, known as one half of the comedy team Slovin and Allen.

== Career ==
Allen has been performing stand-up comedy since the late 1990s. In 2001, Allen, along with his writing partner, Eric Slovin, appeared in their own Comedy Central Presents special, which featured sketches such as "Time Machine" and "Turkey Slapper". Slovin and Allen went on to write for Saturday Night Live from 2002 to 2005.

He appeared in the 1997 comedy film Who's the Caboose? starring Sarah Silverman, which featured early movie appearances by several comedians.

A veteran of numerous New York City comedy clubs and alternative venues, Allen performs both solo and as part of the duo "Slovin and Allen". He has toured with comedians such as Eugene Mirman, Demetri Martin, Todd Barry, Michael Showalter, and others. He hosts "Whiplash" at the Upright Citizen's Brigade Theatre in NYC, for which he was nominated for a 2009 ECNY Award for Best Host.

Beginning in September 2005, Allen set a personal goal to read 100 books in one year. Halfway through the project, he cited as favorites The Ginger Man by J.P. Donleavy, The Master and Margarita by Mikhail Bulgakov, Don Quixote by Miguel de Cervantes and works by Octavia Butler.

Allen's writing has appeared in the New York Times Magazine. His television credits include Late Night with Conan O'Brien, Funny or Die Presents, Comedians of Comedy, Human Giant, Michael and Michael Have Issues.

Allen co-starred in the comedy series Jon Benjamin Has a Van, which ran on Comedy Central for one season in 2011. He was also the show's co-creator and executive producer.

Allen was a writer and executive producer on the first season of IFC series Comedy Bang! Bang!, which aired in 2012. He guest-starred on the third episode which aired on June 22, 2012, playing a man who eats bicycles.
