= On Wings of Song =

On Wings of Song may refer to:

- "Auf Flügeln des Gesanges", On Wings of Song (poem), 1827 poem by Heinrich Heine
- "Auf Flügeln des Gesanges", On Wings of Song (Mendelssohn), 1834 song
  - Arrangement by Franz Liszt for solo piano (S. 547)
- "Auf Flügeln des Gesanges", setting of the poem by Franz Lachner.
- On Wings of Song (novel), 1979 science fiction novel by Thomas Disch
- Love Me Forever, also released as On Wings of Song, 1935 American drama film

== Albums ==
- On Wings of song, album by Robert Gass 1976
- On Wings of song, album by Ann Murray and Felicity Lott 1992
- On Wings of song, album by Jenny Oaks Baker 1998
- Disney's Enchanted, album by Barbara Bonney 2007
- On Wings of Song: The Performance Recordings of Josephine A. Estill 1939–1974
