= Found Footage Festival =

American film festival and live comedy event

- Location: United States
- Founded: 2004
- Language: International
- Website: www.foundfootagefest.com

The Found Footage Festival is an American film festival and live comedy event featuring unusual and humorous found footage clips and films.

== History ==
Founded in 2004 by childhood friends Joe Pickett, Nick Prueher and Geoff Haas, the Festival originated in Wisconsin and Minnesota. While still in high school, Pickett and Prueher began collecting videos from garage sales, training videos from odd jobs, and copies of tapes from a video production house. The friends would then play selections from this collection for entertainment at parties, a practice which continued through their college years at the University of Wisconsin–Eau Claire. In 2004, Pickett and Prueher quit their day jobs to focus on production of their first feature documentary, Dirty Country. They started the touring Found Footage Festival show to fund the production of the documentary. In addition to its regular touring schedule, the Festival has appeared at the HBO US Comedy Arts Festival, Just For Laughs, the New York Comedy Festival, the Impakt Festival in the Netherlands, and the Central Standard Film Festival in Minneapolis, Minnesota. The Festival is based in New York City, with a section of their catalogue located in Chicago.

In April 2017, Gray Television filed a lawsuit against Prueher and Pickett for fraud and copyright infringement, after they appeared on multiple television morning shows (including Gray-owned WEAU-TV) as various fictitious "touring acts", including a fake strongman duo known as "Chop and Steele", and utilized the footage during their show as a critique of television stations only booking acts based on a press release and no further research. The parties agreed to a settlement the following year. In 2022, the feature documentary Chop & Steele, co-directed by Ben Steinbauer and Berndt Mader, made its world premiere at the Tribeca Film Festival. The comedy film follows Prueher and Pickett as they book their gag strongman routine on unsuspecting morning news shows, but when their pranks go viral and land them in federal court with a vengeful media conglomerate, the stress of the lawsuit and pressure to continue their pranks threatens their livelihood and tests their lifelong friendship. The film includes appearances by comedians David Cross, Bobcat Goldthwait, Reggie Watts, and Howie Mandel.

== Show structure ==
The found clips are projected onto a theater screen, with the "host/curators" hosting the event from a staging area in the front. The clips are presented in succession from a master DVD, with the hosts controlling the timing and order by remote control. In addition to introducing their found footage and presenting a brief history of how it was come across, the hosts offer running jokes and commentary during the clips, like a live version of Mystery Science Theater 3000, and implement live comedic sketches and pre-recorded bits between some of the selections.

Although the show evolves with new material for each tour, its midwestern influence is still prominent in its source material, and many of the clips come from this region of the country. In addition, the show continues to feature staple clips that have become fan favorites, including:

- It Only Takes a Second, a safety video from Federated Mutual Insurance
- Iowa City Public Access crime drama “Sin of the City”
- Outtakes from Winnebago promotional videos featuring a foul-mouthed rep named Jack Rebney, later retired and blind. The phenomenon surrounding the clips became the subject of a 2009 documentary called Winnebago Man, which featured the curators in several interviews. Rebney himself made an appearance at the festival.
- Harvey Sid Fisher music videos of songs describing the zodiac
- clips of the public-access television cable TV show Stairway to Stardom
- clips from Carnival in Rio, a 1983 TV travelogue featuring Arnold Schwarzenegger

== Availability ==
In 2006, the Found Footage Festival began offering for sale a DVD of the show's March 25, 2006, screening at Galapagos Art Space in Brooklyn, New York, called Volume One: Live in Brooklyn. This has been supplemented by the 2007 release of a second DVD, Volume Two: Live in Minneapolis, as well as the 2008 release of Volume Three: Live in San Francisco. In December 2009, the Found Footage Festival released Volume Four: Live in Tucson.

In September 2010, The Found Footage Show premiered on The Onion's The A.V. Club website. The series, which was hosted by Pickett and Prueher, showcased found footage clips and ran for 36 episodes over two seasons.

In December 2010, The Found Footage Festival Volume Five was released. The DVD was filmed in front of a live audience at the historic Oriental Theatre in Milwaukee, Wisconsin and features a guest appearance by Bob Odenkirk.

On June 16, 2012, the program for The Found Footage Festival Volume Six was filmed at the Music Box Theatre in Chicago. The DVD was released in August 2012 in conjunction with a 100-show tour.

In August 2012 the duo appeared on Jimmy Kimmel Live! to talk about the festival and show clips from their current tour.

== DVD releases ==
- Found Footage Festival Volume One: Live in Brooklyn (2006)
- Found Footage Festival Volume Two: Live in Minneapolis (2007)
- Found Footage Festival Volume Three: Live in San Francisco (2008)
- Found Footage Festival Volume Four: Live in Tucson (2009)
- Found Footage Festival "Zany" Zingers and Bonked-Out Blunders (2010)
- Found Footage Festival Volume Five: Live in Milwaukee (2010)
- Found Footage Festival Volume Six: Live in Chicago (2012)
- Found Footage Festival Volume 7: Live in North Carolina (2014)
- Found Footage Festival Volume 8: Live in New York (2017)
- Found Footage Festival Volume 9: Live in Austin (2020)
- Found Footage Festival Volume 10 (2021)

== See also ==
- Ephemera § Video and audio ephemera
- The Show with No Name
- The Movie Orgy - Joe Dante compilation film (similar in content)
- Everything Is Terrible!/Memory Hole
- Red Letter Media
