= Lana Wolf =

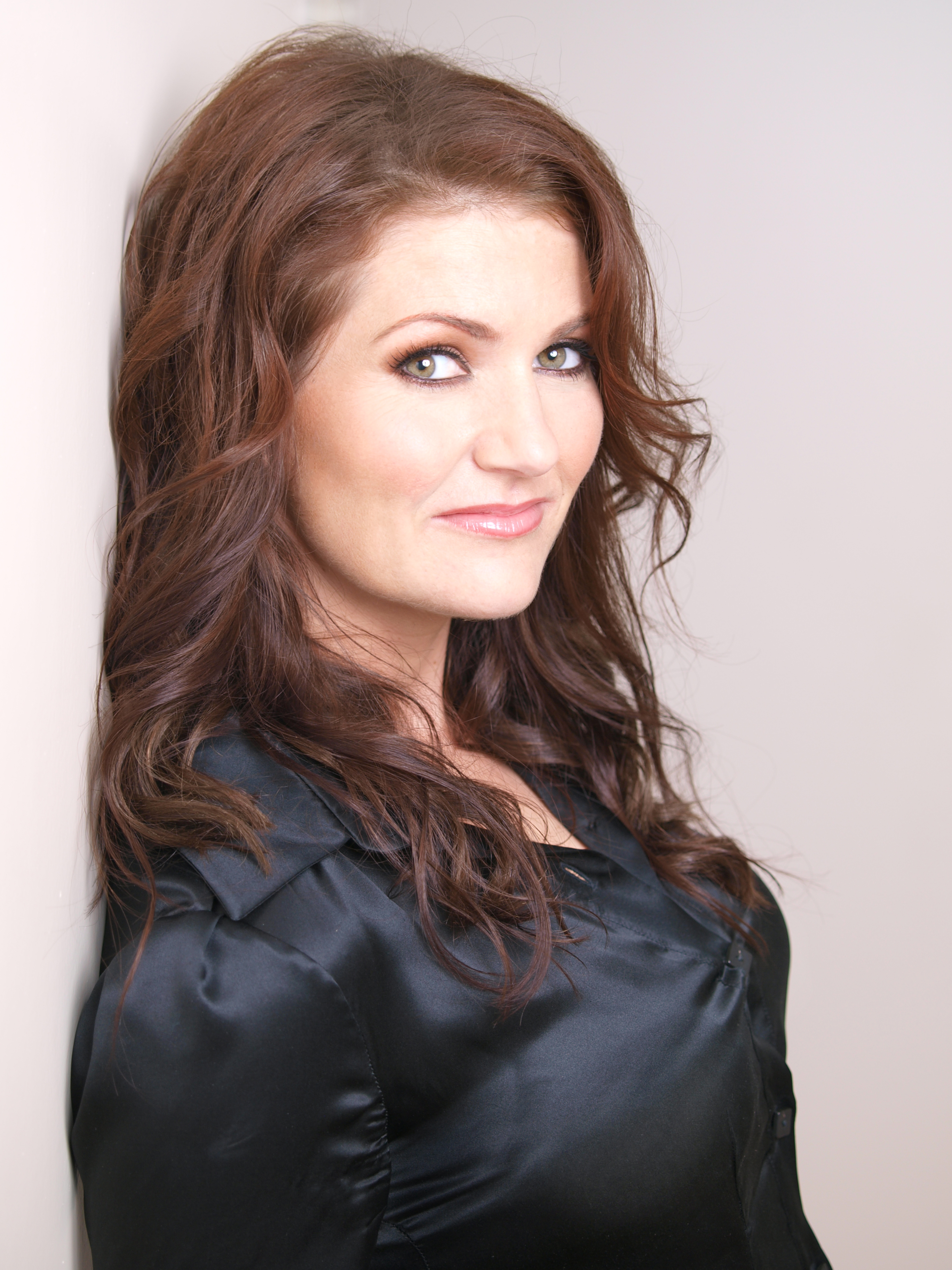

Background information
- Also known as: Lana
- Origin: Netherlands
- Genres: Pop, Rock, Country music
- Years active: 1985–present
- Labels: JL Records, (Netherlands)
- Website: https://lanawolf.nl

Lana Wolf (born 14 December 1975 in Wezep, Gelderland) is a musician and singer. She sang with many international artists, among which are The Trammps, George McCrae, Londonbeat, Frans Bauer, René Froger, Gerard Cox and Linda, Roos and Jessica as well as with the Metropole Orchestra.

Wolf started her career at the age of ten. After having performed with a number of bands including Rent a VIP of Babette van Veen, Lana got her first record deal. For weeks she was in several charts. Furthermore, she was broadcast on Radio Noord Zee and she was guest in popular TV shows Koffietijd' (RTL4), AVRO's Sterrenslag and Barend & Van Dorp.

== Theatre ==
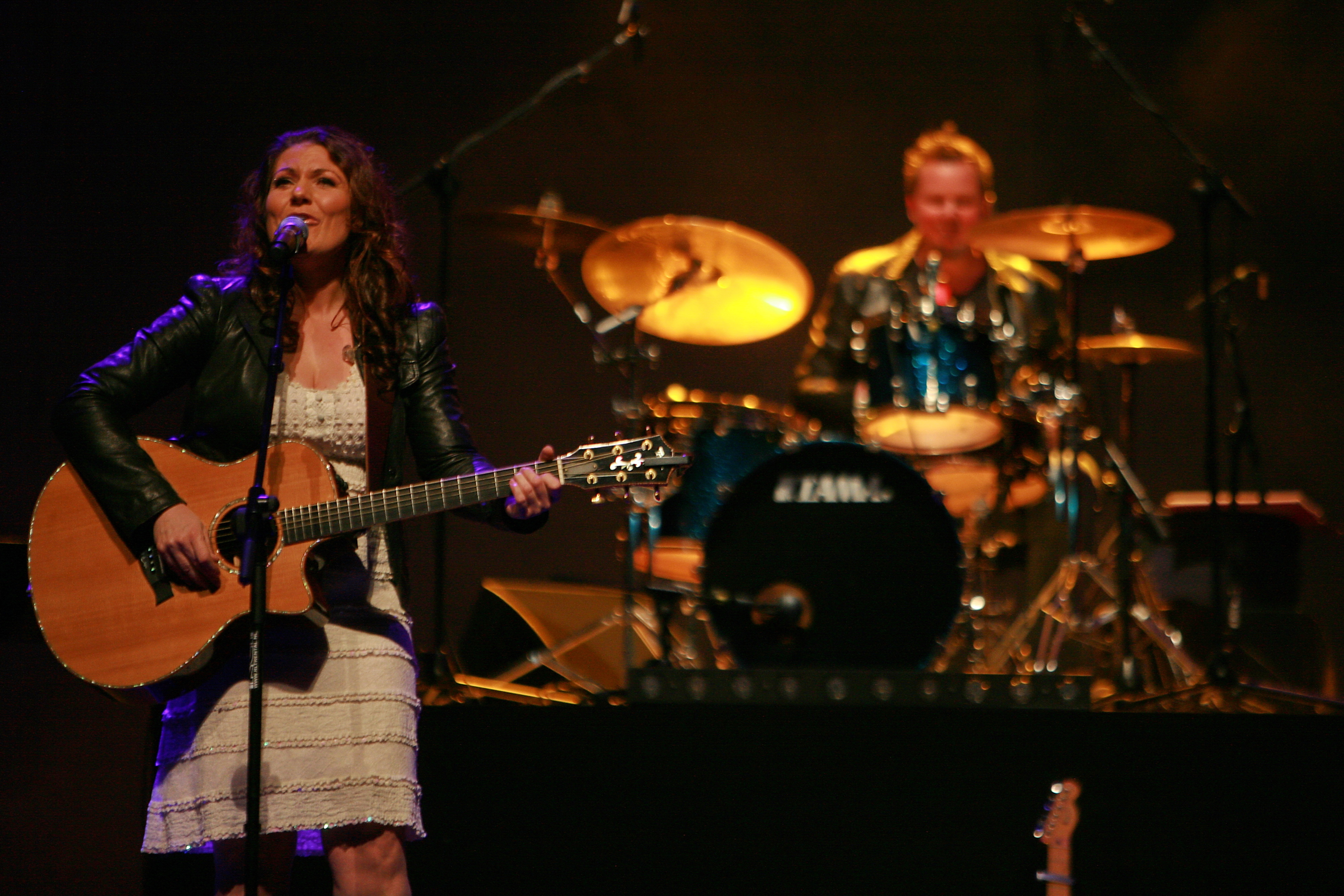
Lana Wolf at the American Country Legends, World Forum Theater, The Hague, 2015

She sang in several theatre shows, among which are Those were the Days and De Grote Kerstshow with the Irish musical star Peter Corry. In 2008 she is one of the leading ladies in A Tribute to the Bee Gees. 2009 Lana has a leading role with the Dutch Orchestra Royal Airforce in the theatre show Rockopera in Concert.

2011 Lana was guest artist with The Queen Experience in a sold out GelreDome (30.000 people). This show is the biggest Queen/Freddie Mercury tribute in Europe till now. Lana sings two duets with Joseph Clark: Who Wants To Live Forever and Somebody To Love. The stage director was Gary Lloyd. Other guests were Wibi Soerjadi and Sibongile Mngoma. The music was arranged by David Keech and presentation done by Erik de Zwart.

Starting 2014 Lana Wolf produces and stars in a country music theater show The American Country Legends with try-outs in World Forum Theater and RAI Theater. November 2018, she received the country music award 'Show of 2018', awarded by the Dutch CMA.

2022 Lana is touring with her theatre show, Linda Ronstadt & Friends.

== Music Album ==
After several years of touring through Europe, Wolf started a musical adventure in New York City with top producer Camus Celli (Gavin DeGraw, Tina Turner and Chaka Khan) and recorded her album Something About Lana. Major contributors are: Paul Conte (songwriter), Dave Kutch (mastering), Marc Slutsky (drummer), Sophia Ramos backing vocals and Josh Grant at Vel Records.

From this album the song See The Light has been released August 2010 and the album itself has been released September 2010.

In 2014, Wolf recorded a country music album called 'Nashville' in Studio 19 Nashville. Produced by John Heinrich and Lana Wolf.

In 2017, she recorded another country music album called 'Fireflies in Nashville' in Studio 19 Nashville, which was produced and written mainly by herself.

== Vocal Coach ==
From 2005 onwards, Wolf coaches individual vocalists, as well as choirs. She teaches from modern techniques such as Complete Vocal Technique (CVT) by Cathrine Sadolin and Estill Voice Training System (EVTS) by Jo Estill.

== TV & Radio ==
TV appearances were with the show Teacher of the Year, where Wolf sang the title song of Fame (musical) and the show Max & Lorretta with A Tribute to the Bee Gees.,

In 2009, Wolf was anchorwoman of the Dutch TV programme En Dan Nog Even Dit (RTV Oost).

In 2009, she is radio producer / editor with the radio-show Stenders Eetvermaak at radio 3FM, working for the Dutch broadcasting company VARA.

Starting 2008 Wolf is the weekly sidekick in the radio-show of the Dutch DJ, Rob Stenders at KX Radio. Starting 2011 she is DJ with her own weekly radioshow Het Uur Van de Wolf (The Hour Of The Wolf), where she selects her favorite music. From 2018 onwards, Lana is DJ and producer at NH Radio and Ice Radio.

For Radio Veronica, Radio 3FM (BNN and PowNed) and KX radio Lana sings the jingles starting 2010.

== Comicbook ==
In 2010, a comicbook (the first of six) series named 'Sanguis' was internationally released, where Wolf starred along with her KX Radio colleagues Rob Stenders and Fred Siebelink. Wolf's character was a vampire.

== Art ==
In March 2020, Netherlands was affected by the COVID-19 pandemic, due to which Wolf's music business came to a halt. Since then, she made many drawings and paintings.

== Discography ==
- Vuur en Vlam (1997)
- Wij (1997)
- Loop niet weg van mij (1998)
- De Zwolsche Muziekfabriek (album) (2002).
- Free Your Mind (2002).
- Letting Go (2008)
- Why Should I Stay (2009)
- Rockopera in Concert (album) (2009).
- See The Light (2010) - Highest position in Dutch Single Top 100: 34
- Something About Lana (album) (2010)
- Willin' (2014)
- Nashville (album) (2014)
- Fireflies in Nashville (album) (2017)
