= Joan Lader =

American vocal coach and voice therapist

Joan Lader is an American vocal coach and voice therapist. She is known for her work with elite performers and recording artists as well as for the rehabilitation of injured voices. Her teaching methods combine elements of voice science, acoustics, and bodywork. She is a recipient of the Tony Honors for Excellence in Theatre in recognition of her contributions to the Broadway theatre community.

== Education ==
Lader received a B.S. in Theatre and Music from the Pennsylvania State University and an M.A. in Speech Pathology and Audiology from Hunter College. She is a graduate of the High School of Music & Art, now known as the Fiorello H. LaGuardia High School. Lader studied under the voice scientist Jo Estill in New York City and is a certified Master Teacher of the Estill Voice Training system. Her practice is also informed by studies in Alexander Technique, Fitzmaurice Voicework, and the work of Arthur Lessac.

== Career ==
In the 1970s, Lader performed off-Broadway with the Light Opera of Manhattan. She became involved in voice therapy and rehabilitation for singers when Mount Sinai Hospital began sending her clients after she completed an externship there. Lader has maintained a private voice studio in New York City since 1982, but does not disclose her client list. Performers who have publicly referenced their work with Lader include:

- Annaleigh Ashford
- Aaron Tveit
- Betty Buckley
- Cynthia Erivo
- Raul Esparza
- Eden Espinosa
- Harvey Fierstein
- Roberta Flack
- Santino Fontana
- Sutton Foster
- Renée Elise Goldsberry
- Anne Hathaway
- Hugh Jackman
- Patti LuPone
- Madonna
- Michael McElroy
- Donna Murphy
- Billy Porter
- Sting
- Dawn Upshaw
- Frederica von Stade
- Rachel Zegler

Lader is also hired on retainer by Broadway producers to provide lessons to performers in their shows, which have included Chicago, Moulin Rouge, Spamalot, Sweeney Todd, and the 2024 revival of Cabaret. She is credited on the films Les Misérables, Mary Poppins Returns, and Evita.

Lader has been a guest lecturer at Columbia University, Yale University, Pace University, Berklee College of Music, and Peabody Institute of Music, and serves as a consultant for Manhattan School of Music and the New Studio at NYU Tisch. She has presented for the Voice Foundation in Philadelphia, the New York Singing Teachers’ Association, the Pacific Voice and Speech Foundation in San Francisco, and the National YoungArts Foundation.

== Awards ==
- 2026: National Association of Teachers of Singing Lifetime Achievement Award
- 2025: Estill Lifetime Achievement Award
- 2016: Tony Honors for Excellence in Theatre

== Books and Media ==
- 2024 Alexis Soloski, "Joan Lader Keeps Broadway in Tune", The New York Times, February 7, 2024, https://www.nytimes.com/2024/02/07/theater/joan-lader-broadway-vocal-coach.html
- 2018 American Theatre Wing video feature, “Working in the Theatre: Vocal Coach.”
- 2018 Interview in So You Want to Sing CCM (Contemporary Commercial Music): A Guide for Performers. Matthew Hoch, editor.
- 2016 Tony Awards Broadcast: Honors for Excellence in the Theatre acceptance speech.
- 2013 Chapter author: “Surviving Eight Shows a Week on Broadway” in The Singer's Guide to Complete Health. Anthony F. Jahn, editor.
- 2010 Interview in Singing in Musical Theatre: The Training of Singers and Actors. Joan Melton, author.
