= Belting (music) =

Singing technique

Belting (or yell singing) is a technique of singing in which a singer carries their chest voice above their break or passaggio with a proportion of head voice. Belting is sometimes described as "high chest voice" or "mixed voice". It is often described as a vocal register, but is rather a descriptive term for the use of a register.

== History ==
Belting, or belt voice, as a vocalism has no specific origin that is easily traceable to one specific source. Belting is a vocal technique found in music from many different cultures around the world. Prominent examples include Mexican, African and Middle Eastern musical traditions. In its modern American sense, belting can trace its origins back to minstrel shows and the vaudeville circuit of the mid-to-late 19th century. During this period, belting was often associated with the lower and working classes, as well as other marginalised communities. It was considered inferior to more traditional singing based in Western classical tradition, which was perceived as more legitimate and upper class.

Belting became commonplace in Broadway musicals following Ethel Merman's performance in Girl Crazy (1930), particularly in the song "I Got Rhythm". The opening credit sequence of the James Bond film Goldfinger (1964) features a title song performed by Shirley Bassey, which established belting as a signature quality of the James Bond films that continued through to the following century.

== Physiology ==
There are many explanations as to how the belting voice quality is produced. Under a scope, the vocal folds visibly shorten and thicken, and they undulate along with more of their vertical surface area than in head register when a smaller segment of their edge must undulate to produce sound.

One researcher, Jo Estill, has conducted research on the belting voice, and describes the belting voice as an extremely muscular and physical way of singing. When observing the vocal tract and torso of singers, while belting, Estill observed:

- Minimal airflow (longer closed phase (70% or greater) than in any other type of phonation)
- Maximum muscular engagement of the torso (in Estill Voice Training terminology this is known as "torso control" or "anchoring")
- Engagement of muscles in the head and neck in order to stabilize the larynx) (in Estill Voice Training terminology this is known as "head and neck control" or "anchoring")
- A downward tilt of the cricoid cartilage (an alternative option is the thyroid tilting backward. Observations show a larger CT space)
- High positioning of the larynx
- Maximum muscular effort of the extrinsic laryngeal muscles, minimum effort at the level of the true vocal folds.
- Narrowing of the aryepiglottic sphincter (the "twanger")

== Acoustics ==
Traditionally, throughout voice pedagogy literature, the belt, yell or call is characterized acoustically on a spectrogram by the presence of a dominant second harmonic. However, belting research is still evolving and changing as voice scientists learn more about vocal function and perception. Belting and yelling share a lot of common characteristics from an acoustical point of view. Due to vocal tract resonances and the shape of the vocal tract, favorable vowels for belting include [æ], found in words like “cat,” and the diphthong [eɪ], found in words like “lame." Belting requires the usage of these “wide” and spread vowels like the ones previously mentioned that shorten the length of the vocal tract and raise the first vocal tract resonance, which is accompanied by the presence of a strong second harmonic. This technique contrasts with traditional western classical schools of thought that do not advocate for the spreading of vowels and raising of the larynx at high registration events. Western classical models typically advocate for a stable laryngeal position and stable vocal tract shape as a voice passes through various registration events.

== Possible dangers ==
Belting without proper coordination can lead to constriction of the muscles surrounding the vocal mechanism. Constriction can consequently lead to vocal deterioration.

While acknowledging the extra risks inherent to belting, many proponents take pains to point out that it is an advanced skill which (so long as it is a "soft yell", and produced properly without straining and pain) is no more damaging to the voice than any other type of singing. Indeed, some genres of singing (such as blues rock) rely on belting to allow the vocalist to "cut through" the electric guitar while playing live. Many in the musical theater industry like to quip, "belting is not bad; bad belting is bad."

As for the physiological and acoustical features of the metallic voice, a master's thesis has drawn the following conclusions:

- No significant changes in frequency and amplitude of F_{1} were observed.
- Significant increases in amplitudes of F_{2}, F_{3} and F_{4} were found.
- In frequencies for F_{2}, metallic voice perceived as louder was correlated to increase in amplitude of F_{3} and F_{4}.
- Vocal tract adjustments like velar lowering, pharyngeal wall narrowing, laryngeal raising, aryepiglottic and lateral laryngeal constriction were frequently found.
