= Austin Film Critics Association Awards 2010 =

Annual US film awards ceremony

6th AFCA Awards

Best Film:
Black Swan

The 6th Austin Film Critics Association Awards, honoring the best in filmmaking for 2010, were announced on December 22, 2010.

== Top 10 Films ==
1. Black Swan
2. The Social Network
3. Inception
4. Toy Story 3
5. The King's Speech
6. True Grit
7. The Fighter
8. A Prophet (Un Prophète)
9. Winter's Bone
10. Scott Pilgrim vs. the World

== Winners ==
- Best Film:
  - Black Swan
- Best Director:
  - Darren Aronofsky – Black Swan
- Best Actor:
  - Colin Firth – The King's Speech
- Best Actress:
  - Natalie Portman – Black Swan
- Best Supporting Actor:
  - Christian Bale – The Fighter
- Best Supporting Actress:
  - Hailee Steinfeld – True Grit
- Best Original Screenplay:
  - Black Swan – Mark Heyman, Andres Heinz, and John McLaughlin
- Best Adapted Screenplay:
  - The Social Network – Aaron Sorkin
- Best Cinematography:
  - Black Swan – Matthew Libatique
- Best Original Score:
  - Tron: Legacy – Daft Punk
- Best Foreign Language Film:
  - A Prophet (Un prophète) • France
- Best Documentary:
  - Exit Through the Gift Shop
- Best Animated Feature:
  - Toy Story 3
- Best First Film:
  - Gareth Edwards – Monsters
- Breakthrough Artist Award:
  - Chloë Grace Moretz – Kick-Ass and Let Me In
- Austin Film Award:
  - Winnebago Man – Ben Steinbauer
- Special Honorary Award:
  - Friday Night Lights, for producing excellent, locally made television and contributing to the film community in Austin for the past five years.
