= Lader =

Lader is a surname. Notable people with the name may include:

- Jason Lader, American record producer
- Joan Lader, American vocal coach
- Philip Lader (born 1946), American diplomat and businessman

== See also ==
- G-Lader a Volkswagen supercharger
