= The Bear (company) =

- Type: Private
- Industry: Entertainment
- Founded: 2007
- Founders: Ben Steinbauer; Berndt Mader
- Headquarters: Austin, Texas, U.S.
- Area served: Global
- Services: Film production; Television production
- Website: www.thebear.us

The Bear is an American production company and creative studio based in Austin, Texas. It was founded in 2007 by directors Ben Steinbauer and Berndt Mader, and as of 2022, its executive producer is Elizabeth Spiva.

== History ==
After meeting at The University of Texas at Austin, Ben Steinbauer and Berndt Mader formed The Bear in 2007.

The company has produced the comedy documentaries, Winnebago Man, directed by Steinbauer, Chop & Steele, directed by Steinbauer and co-directed by Mader, which premiered at the 2022 Tribeca Film Festival, Yeti's Soul of a City, directed by Mader, and the "C'Mon Ted!" political campaign ad, directed by Richard Linklater.

In 2011, Steinbauer and Mader were selected to direct a segment of the feature film, Slacker 2011, a remake of Linklater's Slacker (1990) by 24 Austin-based filmmakers. The firm produced 5 Time Champion (2011), starring Betty Buckley, Jon Gries, and Dana Wheeler-Nicholson. The film was written and directed by Mader and won the Target Filmmaker Award at the 2011 Dallas International Film Festival.

In 2013, the firm co-produced the feature film Prince Avalanche directed by David Gordon Green, starring Paul Rudd and Emile Hirsch. Also produced in 2013 was Double Play directed by Gabe Klinger, about the relationship between Richard Linklater and experimental filmmaker, James Benning.

In 2015, the firm produced Booger Red (2015) directed by Mader, starring Ornur Turkel and Marija Karan. The film won the Special Jury Prize at the 2016 Dallas International Film Festival.

The firm has produced short films including Brute Force (2012); Bad Guy #2 (2014); Calls To Okies: The Park Grubbs Story (2015); The Superlative Light (2016); Death Metal (2016); Slow To Show (2016), directed by Steinbauer, which was acquired by The New York Times Op-Docs; and Heroes From the Storm (2017).

The Bear has created commercials for clients including Budweiser, Capital One, Fritos, Whole Foods, Alfa Romeo, Crate & Barrel, Yeti, Dell, McCoy’s, Tito’s and the US Air Force.

== Filmography ==
=== Film ===
Year	Title	Director	Company	Ref
2009	Winnebago Man	Ben Steinbauer	Kino Lorber	
2012	Brute Force	Ben Steinbauer	The Bear	
2013	Prince Avalanche	David Gordon Green	Magnolia	
2013	Documentary Subjects Wanted with Rory Scovel - Funny or Die	Ben Steinbauer	No Distributor	
2014	Bad Guy #2	Chris McInroy	No Distributor	
2014	Double Play: James Benning and Richard Linklater	Gabe Klinger	Cinema	
2015	Booger Red	Berndt Mader	Dark Star Pictures	
2015	Calls To Okies: The Park Grubbs Story	Ben Steinbauer, Bradley Beesley	NA	
2016	Death Metal	Chris McInroy	The Bear	
2016	The Superlative Light 360 VR	Ben Steinbauer	The Bear	
2016	The Superlative Light	Ben Steinbauer	The Bear	
2016	Slow To Show	Ben Steinbauer	The Bear	
2017	Heroes From the Storm	Ben Steinbauer	The Bear	
2019	Siren Song	Ben Steinbauer, Berndt Mader	No Distributor	
2022	Chop & Steele	Ben Steinbauer, Berndt Mader	Drafthouse Films	

=== Music video ===
Year	Title	Artist
2012	Parted Ways	Heartless Bastards
2014	Out On the Street	Spanish Gold
2015	I'm Enough	The Mrs
2017	Sonic Demon	Rainbows Are Free
2018	Up Around the Sun	Up Around The Sun
