= Alexander Anderson (illustrator) =

American physician and illustrator

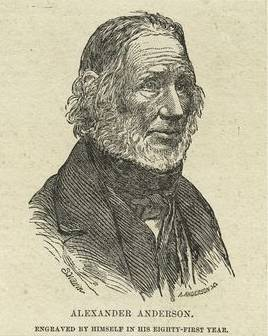
Self-portrait of Alexander Anderson at age 81

Alexander Anderson (April 21, 1775 – January 17, 1870) was an American medical doctor and illustrator.

== Biography ==
Coat of Arms of Alexander Anderson

Anderson was born in New York City to Scottish parents. "At the age of twelve years he made his first attempts at engraving on copper, frequently using pennies rolled out, and on type-metal plates. He received no instruction, and his knowledge was acquired by watching jewelers and other workmen." Anderson was a contemporary of Thomas Bewick, and published his first work in Arnaud Bernaud's "The Looking Glass of the Mind" in 1794. However, he was urged by his parents to pursue a career in medicine. He apprenticed with Dr. William Smith at fourteen and received his license at twenty. He became the first doctor at what would become Bellevue Hospital, established to deal with an outbreak of yellow fever in New York City in 1795. When the epidemic ended, he sought an academic degree in medicine, "married, became a father, and opened a medical office"; however, he soon abandoned this office in favour of a shop "that sold children's books he personally engraved". He graduated from Columbia College in 1796 with an M.D.

Another outbreak of yellow fever began in 1798, and Anderson returned to Bellevue as the resident physician. He resigned a few weeks later after his three-month-old son, brother, and father all died in the epidemic. His wife and mother died soon afterwards. Anderson then became an engraver and was termed "America's First Illustrator".

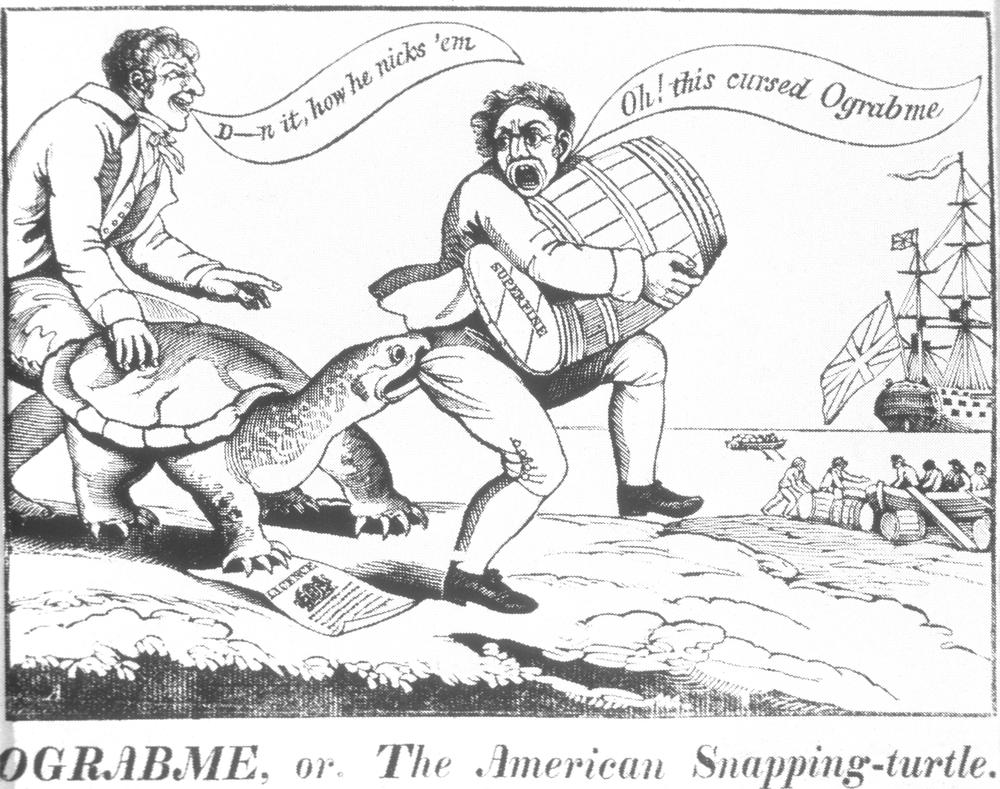
Anderson's "Ograbme" cartoon.

He is one of the earliest American wood-engravers. He produced works for books, periodicals, and newspapers. He also engraved a number of ream wrappers. Anderson is the author of the cartoon Ograbme, a spoof on the Embargo Act of 1807. He confined himself to wood engraving from 1820, and was engraver for the American Tract society for several years. His work includes illustrations for Bewick's "Birds"; illustration for Webster's Speller, and forty engravings for an edition of Shakespeare.

Anderson died in New York City on January 17, 1870, at the age of 94.
