= EVT =

EVT may refer to:

- Endovascular thrombectomy, a therapy for ischemic strokes or other ischemia
- Engineering validation test, testing of prototypes for viability
- Estill Voice Training, a program for developing vocal skills
- EVT Limited, formerly Event Hospitality and Entertainment, an Australian company
- Expectancy-value theory, in communications
- Expectancy violations theory, in communications
- Extreme value theorem, in calculus
- Extreme value theory, in statistics
- Electrically variable transmission, a type of vehicle transmission
- .evt, a file extension for Windows event logs
