= Roberto Demo =

Italian jazz singer-songwriter and vocal teacher

Roberto Demo (born 1965 in Turin) is an Italian jazz singer-songwriter and vocal teacher. During the 1990s he attended seminars of artists like Barney Kessel, Mick Goodrick, Scott Henderson, Jim Hall (musician), and vocal teacher Jo Estill, who played a key role in his development.

During his career he has recorded 2 albums (La porta, 2001, and Sono un bluff, 2005)), and played with several Italian and international artists, including Emanuele Cisi, Luigi Martinale, Jonathan Gee, Steve Rose, and Winston Clifford.

== Discography ==
- La porta (2001)
- Sono un bluff (2005)
