= On Wings of Song: The Performance Recordings of Josephine A. Estill 1939–1974 =

Compilation album by Jo Estill
- Released: July 2009
- Recorded: 1939–1974
- Genre: Classical music
- Producer: Alice Estill Miller

On Wings of Song: The Performance Recordings of Josephine A. Estill 1939–1974 is a compilation album on four CDs featuring performances by Jo Estill. The album is taken from original live recordings by Charles M. "Bud" Edmonds of Colorado Springs, Colorado, United States. The album was remastered at Banquet Studios, Sebastopol, California, United States during 2008–2009, with sound engineer Darryl Webb and produced by Alice Estill Miller. The album sleeve notes credit special thanks to Zana Timroth, Donald P. Jenkins, Kim Steinhauer and Steven Chicurel.

== Track listing ==
Disk 1 (The Early Years 1939–1950)

#	Title	Writer(s)	Musician(s)	Notes	Year	Length
1.	"KQV - Theme - Cuban Love Song"		Tipton, piano	Pittsburg Radio Station Show	1939	1:24
2.	"Begin the Beguine"			Inglewood Park Cemetery Assn., Inglewood Park, Los Angeles, CA	1944	3:30
3.	"Don't You Know"			Inglewood Park Cemetery Assn., Inglewood Park, Los Angeles, CA	1944	2:06
4.	"Sophisticated Lady"			Inglewood Park Cemetery Assn., Inglewood Park, Los Angeles, CA	1944	2:15
5.	"On Wings of Song"	Felix Mendelssohn	Inglewood Park quartet	Inglewood Park Cemetery Assn., Inglewood Park, Los Angeles, CA	1945	3:08
6.	"Adele's Laughing Song"	Johann Strauss II		Inglewood Park Cemetery Assn., Inglewood Park, Los Angeles, CA	1945	3:35
7.	"Oft in the Silent Night"	Sergei Rachmaninoff		Inglewood Park Cemetery Assn., Inglewood Park, Los Angeles, CA	1945	2:38
8.	"Adazietto"	Georges Bizet		Inglewood Park Cemetery Assn., Inglewood Park, Los Angeles, CA	1945	4:03
9.	Ourvre Ton Coeur	Georges Bizet		Inglewood Park Cemetery Assn., Inglewood Park, Los Angeles, CA	1945	2:22
10.	"Dance a Cachuca"	Gilbert and Sullivan	Inglewood Park Quartet	Inglewood Park Cemetery Assn., Inglewood Park, Los Angeles, CA	1945	1:35
11.	"The Moon and I with Intro"	Gilbert and Sullivan	Earl Towner, conductor	Inglewood Park Cemetery Assn., Inglewood Park, Los Angeles, CA	1945	3:03
12.	Stairway to Stardom - Interview			Stairway to Stardom, Columbine Network, The Broadmoor, Colorado Springs, CO	1947	1:42
13.	"Un Bel Di"	Giacomo Puccini		Stairway to Stardom, Columbine Network, The Broadmoor, Colorado Springs, CO	1947	1:43
14.	"Starke Scheide" (Götterdämmerung)	Richard Wagner	Max Lanner, piano	Colorado College, Colorado Springs, CO	1950	4:00
15.	"Brunhilde's Immolation"	Richard Wagner	Max Lanner, piano	Colorado College, Colorado Springs, CO	1950	3:44
16.	"Mein Erbe" (Götterdämmerung)	Richard Wagner	Max Lanner, piano	Colorado College, Colorado Springs, CO	1950	4:14
17.	"Immolation Finale"	Richard Wagner	Max Lanner, piano	Colorado College, Colorado Springs, CO	1950	1:47
18.	"Du Bist der Lange"	Richard Wagner	Max Lanner, piano	Colorado College, Colorado Springs, CO	1950	9:47
19.	"Mild und Heise Liebestad"	Richard Wagner	Max Lanner, piano	Colorado College, Colorado Springs, CO	1950	4:52

Disk 2 (Classical Repertoire 1960–1969)

#	Title	Writer(s)	Musician(s)	Notes	Year	Length
1.	"Kyrie" (Great Mass in C minor)	Wolfgang Amadeus Mozart		Colorado Springs Chorale	1965	5:42
2.	"Laudamus Te" (Great Mass in C minor)	Wolfgang Amadeus Mozart		Colorado Springs Chorale	1965	4:17
3.	"Et Incarnatus Est" (Great Mass in C minor)	Wolfgang Amadeus Mozart		Colorado Springs Chorale	1965	7:42
4.	"Messiah 14, 15, 16" (Messiah)	George Frideric Handel		Colorado Springs Chorale	1964	2:31
5.	"Messiah 18 - Rejoice!" (Messiah)	George Frideric Handel		Colorado Springs Chorale	1964	4:42
6.	"Messiah - Lullaby" (Messiah)	George Frideric Handel		Colorado Springs Chorale	1964	4:19
7.	"C'est l'extase" (Ariettes oubliées)	Claude Debussy			1963	2:35
8.	"Il pleure dans mon cœur comme il pleut sur la ville" (Ariettes oubliées)	Claude Debussy			1963	1:45
9.	"L'ombre des arbres" (Ariettes oubliées)	Claude Debussy			1963	2:18
10.	"Chevaux de bois" (Ariettes oubliées)	Claude Debussy			1963	2:54
11.	"Green: Voici des fruits, des fleurs, des feuilles" (Ariettes oubliées)	Claude Debussy			1963	2:07
12.	"Spleen: Les roses étaient toutes rouges" (Ariettes oubliées)	Claude Debussy			1963	2:03
13.	"Bachianas Brasileiras #5" (Bachianas Brasileiras)	Heitor Villa-Lobos	8 cellos	Colorado Springs Symphony	1963	6:37
14.	"Psalm 100"	Ned Rorem			1964	1:36
15.	"Echo's Song"	Ned Rorem			1964	2:13
16.	"Silver Swan"	Ned Rorem			1964	3:35
17.	"Spring"	Ned Rorem			1964	2:03
18.	"What If Some Little Pain"	Ned Rorem			1964	2:12

Disk 3 (Religious Repertoire 1970–1974)

#	Title	Writer(s)	Musician(s)	Notes	Year	Length
1.	"The 23rd Psalm"			Church solos with organ	1970	3:14
2.	"The 91st Psalm"			Church solos with organ	1970	4:00
3.	"God So Loved the World"			Church solos with organ	1970	3:56
4.	"Thine Is The Greatness and the Power"			Church solos with organ	1970	3:29
5.	"Whither Shall I Go Forth"			Church solos with organ	1970	3:38
6.	"What Manner of Love"			Church solos with organ	1970	5:29
7.	"How Beautiful Upon the Mountains"			Church solos with organ	1970	5:36
8.	"So Near to God Am I"			Church solos with organ	1970	2:29
9.	"The Lord Is My Light"			Church solos with organ	1970	3:23
10.	"Love Is of God"			Church solos with organ	1970	3:51
11.	"Think On These Things"			Church solos with organ	1970	3:11
12.	"Sanctus, Benedictus" excerpt (Missa Solemnis)	Ludwig van Beethoven		Colorado Springs Chorale	1974	7:39
13.	"Agnes Dei" (Missa Solemnis)	Ludwig van Beethoven		Colorado Springs Chorale	1974	15:39

Disk 4 (Opera 1970–1974 & Comments 2007)

#	Title	Writer(s)	Musician(s)	Notes	Year	Length
1.	"4th Movement" (Requiem For Rossini)	Giuseppe Verdi		Colorado Springs Chorale & Symphony	1964	14:36
2.	"Senza mamma: Sister Angelica" (Suor Angelica)	Giacomo Puccini		Colorado Springs Opera Association	1963	4:47
3.	"Sister Angelica Finale" (Suor Angelica)	Giacomo Puccini		Colorado Springs Opera Association	1963	3:42
4.	"Duet: Santuzza-Mamma Lucia" (Cavalleria rusticana)	Pietro Mascagni		Colorado Springs Opera Association	1964	2:20
5.	"We Will Sing of the Lord Victorius" (Cavalleria rusticana)	Pietro Mascagni		Colorado Springs Opera Association	1964	4:31
6.	"Now You Shall Know" (Cavalleria rusticana)	Pietro Mascagni		Colorado Springs Opera Association	1964	5:36
7.	"Beat Me - Insult Me" (Cavalleria rusticana)	Pietro Mascagni		Colorado Springs Opera Association	1964	3:29
8.	"Trio" (Cavalleria rusticana)	Pietro Mascagni		Colorado Springs Opera Association	1964	2:51
9.	"Love Me Again" (Cavalleria rusticana)	Pietro Mascagni		Colorado Springs Opera Association	1964	5:01
10.	"Santuzza and Alfio" (Cavalleria rusticana)	Pietro Mascagni		Colorado Springs Opera Association	1964	3:21
11.	"For Them There is No Ransom" (Cavalleria rusticana)	Pietro Mascagni		Colorado Springs Opera Association	1964	1:50
12.	Act 1 Duet (Tosca)	Giacomo Puccini		Colorado Springs Opera Association	1965	3:34
13.	"Vissi d'arte" (Tosca)	Giacomo Puccini		Colorado Springs Opera Association	1965	3:21
14.	Comments on Voice Training			At the Estill Institute, Boulder, Colorado	2006	10:22
