= On Wings of Song (novel) =

1979 novel by Thomas M. Disch

- First US hardcover edition
- Author: Thomas M. Disch
- Language: English
- Genre: Science fiction
- Publisher: St. Martin's Press (US); Victor Gollancz Ltd (UK)
- Publication date: 1979
- Publication place: United States
- Media type: Print (hardback & paperback)
- Pages: 315
- ISBN: 0-575-02547-6
- OCLC: 6437204

On Wings of Song is a 1979 science fiction novel by American writer Thomas M. Disch. It was first published as a serial in The Magazine of Fantasy & Science Fiction in three installments in February to April 1979. Like Disch's previous novel 334, it is a bitter satire that depicts a near-future America falling into worsening economic and social crisis. It was critically well received and is often considered Disch's best work. It was, however, a commercial failure.

== Title ==
"On Wings of Song" is the English title of the German Romantic poem Auf Flügeln des Gesanges by Heinrich Heine, which was set to music by Felix Mendelssohn. It speaks of flying with a lover to a peaceful paradise in "the fields of the Ganges".

== Plot summary ==
The settings are suburban Iowa and New York City, around the middle of the 21st century. Its first section describes the childhood and adolescence of Daniel Weinreb, an imaginative boy who manages to adapt well to his conservative surroundings until a minor act of rebellion sends him to prison at age 14. Daniel's experience there makes him eager to leave the Midwest. After falling in love with the daughter of a powerful and reactionary local tycoon, he moves with her to New York, dreaming of becoming a musician and exploring the forbidden art of "flying"—electronically assisted astral projection. Tragedy and exploitation leave Daniel's idealism in ruins, but he persists and becomes an internationally famous and controversial performer.

Alongside this Bildungsroman storyline, the novel presents a detailed portrait of a future United States torn by economic hardship and culture war. The Midwestern Farm Belt states are ruled by a coalition of the Christian right, known as "undergoders" (a reference to the successful conservative campaign to add the words "under God" to the Pledge of Allegiance); the nominally secular government is socially repressive and business-friendly to an extreme. The coastal states more closely resemble present-day urban America, with generally permissive social attitudes and artistic ferment, but great economic inequality.

The invention of "flying" (which has happened at some unspecified point prior to the beginning of the novel, and is never described in any technological detail) aggravates these cultural divisions. By using a device that seems to be based on biofeedback, while singing with particular verve (an action that, as Disch suggests, causes unique integration of brain activity), a practitioner can separate mind from body and roam the world as an invisible "fairy", able to travel almost without restriction and perceive hidden things. The undergoders regard this as a sinful and dangerous practice, so much so that they discourage musical performance of any kind; but in the coastal cities flying is a fad, so popular that singers are afraid to admit not having been able to achieve it. Many Americans simply refuse to believe that such a radical escape is possible and claim that flying is a hallucination, but still take precautions to avoid being observed by "fairies".

== Literary significance ==
Harold Bloom listed On Wings of Song in The Western Canon, as did David Pringle in his Science Fiction: 100 Best Novels. John Clute wrote in The Encyclopedia of Science Fiction that it "thematically sums up most of the abiding concerns of TMD's career, as well as presenting an exemplary portrait of the pleasures and miseries of art in a world made barbarous by material scarcities and spiritual lassitude; in the final analysis, however, it lacks the complex, energetic denseness of the earlier book." Author William Gibson described it as "one of the great neglected masterpieces of late 20th-century science fiction." Michael Bishop in A Reverie for Mister Ray writes that the novel "comments on the American predicament by exaggerating its salient stinks...leaving us to walk about in this funhouse future as if it were real. [We are] repeatedly surprised by the vividness with which Disch has rendered our present provincialism, conformity, commercialism, frivolity, intolerance, and narcissism. On Wings of Song is a major accomplishment of American letters."

== Awards and nominations ==
On Wings of Song won the John W. Campbell Memorial Award in 1980. It was nominated for the 1979 Nebula Award for Best Novel, the 1979 BSFA Award for Best Novel, the 1980 Hugo Award for Best Novel, the 1980 Locus Award for Best Science Fiction Novel, the 1981 Balrog Award, the 1982 Prometheus Award, and was runner-up for the 2004 Premio Ignotus for Best Foreign Novel for the Spanish translation, En alas de la canción.

== Sources ==
- Rossi, Umberto, "On a Background, Catastrophic, the Story, Ironic: Ecological Awareness and Capitalist Shortsightedness in Thomas M. Disch’s On Wings of Song", Foundation 31:85, Summer 2002, 89-105.
