= Pink Collar Crimes =

American television series

- Genre: Television series
- Created by: Sharon Liese
- Directed by: Ben Steinbauer
- Presented by: Marcia Clark
- Composer: Jane Wiedlin
- Original language: English
- No. of seasons: 1
- No. of episodes: 8

Production
- Executive producer: Jon Kroll

Original release
- Release: July 28 – September 15, 2018

Pink Collar Crimes is a true crime show that aired on CBS. The series focuses on real crimes committed by women and includes interviews with the suspects, victims, private investigators, police, and attorneys involved with the cases.

== Episodes ==
Season	Episodes	Originally released	
Season	Episodes	First released	Last released
1	8	July 28, 2018	September 15, 2018

=== Season 1 (2018) ===
No. overall	No. in season	Title	Original release date	U.S. viewers (millions)
1	1	"Minivan Mom Bank Robber"	July 28, 2018	N/A
2	2	"Jackpot Jackie"	August 4, 2018	N/A
3	3	"The Psychic Didn't See Him Coming"	August 11, 2018	N/A
4	4	"The She-Wolf of Wall Street"	August 11, 2018	N/A
5	5	"The Crappy Accountant"	August 18, 2018	N/A
6	6	"The Queen of Coupons"	September 1, 2018	N/A
7	7	"Clash of the Carriages"	September 8, 2018	N/A
8	8	"The Outcast of Brownstone Brooklyn"	September 15, 2018	N/A

== See also ==
- Bob Nygaard, Psychic fraud investigator who played himself in season 1, episode 3, The Psychic Didn't See Him Coming
