= Matthew Hoch =

American academic and teacher of singing (born 1975)

Matthew Hoch (born December 29, 1975, in New Orleans, Louisiana) is an American academic and teacher of singing.

Hoch is currently professor of voice at Auburn University, where he teaches applied voice, lyric diction, and vocal literature courses. From 2006 to 2012 he was assistant professor of voice at Shorter University in Rome, Georgia, where he was a member of the voice faculty, taught vocal literature, and served as coordinator of voice studies. From 2006 to 2008, he conducted the Shorter Chorus. Before coming to Shorter University, he was assistant professor of music and director of choral activities at the University of Wisconsin–Barron County. Prior to that appointment, he held part-time teaching positions at Central Connecticut State University, Northeastern University, the Hartt School, and the New England Conservatory.

Hoch is primarily known to the national voice pedagogy community through his scholarship, authorship of several books, and service to several high-profile professional organizations, most notably the National Association of Teachers of Singing (NATS) and the New York Singing Teachers Association (NYSTA). For NYSTA, Hoch held the offices of president (2017–2020) and vice president (2012–2017) and served as editor-in-chief of VOICEPrints: The Journal of NYSTA from 2008–2016. For NATS, Hoch served two terms as chair of the professional development committee, hosted the 2009 NATS Intern Program at Shorter University, and from 2006–2011 was the host of NATS CHATS, a monthly online resource utilized by voice professionals throughout the world. He is an alumnus of the 2006 NATS Intern Program and received the 2007 NATS Voice Pedagogy Award. His book, A Dictionary for the Modern Singer, was published by Rowman & Littlefield in 2014. In 2015, he was named editor of the So You Want to Sing series, a joint venture between NATS and Rowman & Littlefield. The series published its twentieth book in 2020. In 2016, he was awarded the Van L. Lawrence Fellowship by the Voice Foundation and NATS. In 2022, Hoch was named associate editor of voice pedagogy for the NATS Journal of Singing, succeeding Scott McCoy (2007–2021) and Richard Miller (2002–2007).

As a professional baritone, he has performed with the Oregon Bach Festival, the Santa Fe Desert Chorale, Conspirare, the Handel and Haydn Society, and the Festival dei Due Mondi in Spoleto, Italy. As a regular participant in the Carnegie Hall choral workshops, he performed under the batons of Robert Spano, Peter Schreier, Charles Dutoit, and Helmuth Rilling. Hoch has also performed with Ash Lawn Opera, the Hartford Symphony, Santa Fe Pro Musica, the United States Coast Guard Chamber Players, and the College Light Opera Company on Cape Cod. He has studied with Meredith Monk through the Weill Institute at Carnegie Hall, with Alice Parker on a Melodious Accord Fellowship, and has been the recipient of numerous awards and grants, including the triennial Award of Merit from Mu Phi Epsilon in 2020.

Hoch also maintains a secondary career as an Episcopal choirmaster, currently serving at Holy Trinity Episcopal Church in Auburn, Alabama, and formerly serving at St Peter's Episcopal Church in Rome, Georgia. His second book, Welcome to Church Music & The Hymnal 1982, was published by Morehouse in 2015. He has also published articles in the Journal of the Association of Anglican Musicians and The Hymn and was a 2016 fellow-in-residence at Sewanee: The University of the South.

He received a Bachelor of Music degree, summa cum laude, from Ithaca College, a Master of Music degree from the Hartt School, and a Doctor of Musical Arts degree from the New England Conservatory. His voice teachers have included Carol McAmis, Susan Clickner, Joanna Levy, Mark St. Laurent, and Lawrence Weller. He has pursued advanced studies in voice pedagogy and science with Ingo Titze, Johan Sundberg, and Scott McCoy.

== Bibliography ==
- The Singing Book. 4th ed. Lanham, MD: Rowman & Littlefield, 2024
- The Essentials of CoreSinging. Lanham, MD: Rowman & Littlefield, 2022
- So You Want to Sing Music with Awareness. Lanham, MD: Rowman & Littlefield, 2020
- So You Want to Sing Music by Women. Lanham, MD: Rowman & Littlefield, 2019
- So You Want to Sing World Music. Lanham, MD: Rowman & Littlefield, 2019
- So You Want to Sing CCM. Lanham, MD: Rowman & Littlefield, 2018
- So You Want to Sing Sacred Music. Lanham, MD: Rowman & Littlefield, 2017
- Voice Secrets: 100 Performance Strategies for the Advanced Singer. Lanham, MD: Rowman & Littlefield, 2016
- Latin Lyric Diction Workbook. Nashville, TN: STM Publishers, 2016
- Welcome to Church Music and the Hymnal 1982. New York, NY: Church Publishing, 2015
- A Dictionary for the Modern Singer. Lanham, MD: Rowman & Littlefield, 2014
- Numerous issues of VOICEPrints:The Official Journal of NYSTA (2008–2016)

== Discography ==
- Live from Central New York, Cayuga Vocal Ensemble (CVE, 2001)
- Gian Carlo Menotti, The Saint of Bleecker Street, The Choir and Orchestra of the Festival dei Due Mondi (Chandos, 2002)
- Gian Carlo Menotti, Cantatas, The Choir and Orchestra of the Festival dei Due Mondi (Chandos, 2002)
- A Woodland Christmas The Woodland Scholars (Woodland Records, 2002)
- Journeys of the Spirit, Santa Fe Desert Chorale (SFDC, 2003)
- Harmony of the Heavens, Santa Fe Desert Chorale (SFDC, 2004)
- Consiglio, The Song of Luke, The Phoenix Chamber Ensemble and the Santa Fe Desert Chorale (Equilibrium, 2004)
- Choral Holiday, The Choir and Orchestra of the Oregon Bach Festival (SELCO, 2005)
- Schöpfungsmesse, The Choir and Orchestra of the Oregon Bach Festival (Hänssler, 2007)
- Theriesienmesse, The Choir and Orchestra of the Oregon Bach Festival (Hänssler, 2008)
- Heiligmesse, The Choir and Orchestra of the Oregon Bach Festival (Hänssler, 2009)
- Vespers, The Piffaro Renaissance Band and the Crossing (Navona, 2009)
