= Ben Steinbauer =

American film director (born 1977)

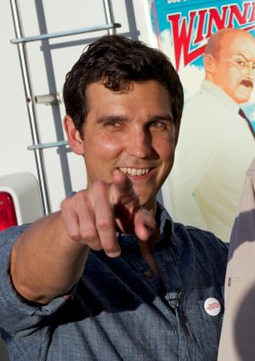
- Ben Steinbauer, in 2010
- Born: Benjamin Jeffrey Steinbauer; July 28, 1977 (age 49); Wichita, Kansas, U.S.
- Education: Edmond Memorial High School; University of Kansas (BA); University of Texas at Austin
- Occupation: Film director
- Years active: 2001–present

Benjamin Jeffrey Steinbauer (born July 28, 1977) is an American film director, showrunner, screenwriter, and film producer. He directed the feature documentary Winnebago Man (2009) and the documentary Chop & Steele (2022), which premiered at the Tribeca Film Festival. Steinbauer was the director of the episodic television show High Hopes for Jimmy Kimmel's production company. He also directed the PBS show Stories of the Mind, and the CBS documentary series Pink Collar Crimes.

== Early life and education ==
Steinbauer graduated from Edmond Memorial High School in Edmond, Oklahoma, in 1995. He then earned a B.A. in Theatre and Film from the University of Kansas in 2001, where he sits on the Professional Advisory Board of KU Film.

While attending college, Steinbauer began his filmmaking career by producing documentaries and music videos for Forty Minutes of Hell, Everest, and The Danny Pound Band. In 2002, he was a camera operator and editor on Bradley Beesley's documentary The Fearless Freaks, that focused on the band The Flaming Lips.

In 2004, Steinbauer enrolled in the graduate film program at the University of Texas at Austin. His pre-thesis film, The Next Tim Day, received the Best Documentary Award at Cinema Texas. In 2006, he was awarded a Princess Grace Award for Filmmaking for his graduate thesis film, which developed into the documentary Winnebago Man (2009).

== Career ==
After completing his studies, Steinbauer served as a faculty member at the University of Texas at Austin and was named 'Teacher of the Year' by the Moody College of Communications.

His documentary, Winnebago Man premiered at the SXSW Film Festival in 2009 and was theatrically released in the U.S. and Canada in 2010. The documentary received praise from Michael Moore and Roger Ebert.

Steinbauer directed the short documentary Brute Force (2012), which premiered at South by Southwest (SXSW) in 2012. In 2012, he co-directed Calls to Okies: The Park Grubbs Story (2015) with Bradley Beesley. The short premiered at SXSW in 2015 and was a Vimeo Staff Pick. Steinbauer produced and directed the short documentary The Superlative Light (2016), which was shot in both traditional 2D as well as in virtual reality (VR), and premiered at the SXSW in 2016. It was also featured in Short of the Week. Steinbauer directed 5 episodes of the PBS series Stories of the Mind in 2016. His 2016 documentary, Slow To Show, was acquired by The New York Times and was a Vimeo Staff Pick.

After Hurricane Harvey, Steinbauer worked with Texas Monthly to make Heroes From the Storm (2017), which was a Vimeo Staff Pick and selected for the U.S. State Department's American Film Program. In 2018, Steinbauer directed eight episodes of the CBS comedic docuseries Pink Collar Crimes, hosted by Marcia Clark. Steinbauer's documentary Siren Song, which he co-directed with Berndt Mader, premiered at the 2019 Austin Film Festival.

Steinbauer's feature-length comedy documentary Chop & Steele, co-directed with Berndt Mader, premiered at the Tribeca Film Festival in 2022. The film features Howie Mandel, David Cross, Reggie Watts, and Bobcat Goldthwait and was released theatrically by Drafthouse Films in spring 2023.

Steinbauer was the director of the Hulu Original comedy series, High Hopes.

Steinbauer co-owns the production company The Bear, founded in 2007, with writer and director Berndt Mader.

== Awards and nominations ==
In 2005, Steinbauer was awarded the Princess Grace Award for Filmmaking for his graduate thesis film, which developed into Winnebago Man. Steinbauer was named "one of the best emerging Texas filmmakers of 2009" by Texas Monthly for Winnebago Man. Winnebago Man won Best Documentary at the Sarasota Film Festival, an Audience Award at the CineVegas Film Festival, Audience Top 10 at Hot Docs Film Festival, the Founders Prize at the Traverse City Film Festival, and Best Documentary at the Edmonton International Film Festival. Winnebago Man was also in the official selection for IDFA and Sheffield Doc/Fest. The Austin Film Critics Association named Winnebago Man the Best Austin Film for 2010.

Steinbauer's 2012 film Brute Force won Best Documentary Short at Sidewalk Moving Pictures Festival in Birmingham, Alabama, and screened at the New Media Film Festival in Los Angeles, California.

== Filmography ==
- Winnebago Man (2009)
- Slacker 2011 (2011)
- Brute Force (2012)
- Documentary Subjects Wanted (2013)
- Calls To Okies: The Park Grubbs Story (2015)
- Slow To Show (2016)
- Stories of the Mind (2016, 5 episodes)
- The Superlative Light (2016)
- Heroes From the Storm (2017)
- Pink Collar Crimes (2018, 8 episodes)
- Siren Song (2019)
- Chop & Steele (2022)
- High Hopes (2022, 6 episodes)
