= New York Singing Teachers' Association =

International educational association

- Abbreviation: NYSTA
- Formation: 1906
- Headquarters: New York City
- President: Sahoko Sato Timpone
- Main organ: VOICEPrints
- Website: www.nyst.org

The New York Singing Teachers' Association (NYSTA) is an international educational association of singing teachers and affiliated voice professionals based in New York City. It was founded in 1906, and is the oldest such group based in the United States. The association provides worldwide training in the teaching of singing through local events, as well as educational media archives and a highly regarded professional development program available to members worldwide via its website, www.nyst.org

== History ==
The NYSTA is the oldest association of its type in the United States. A group of singing teachers incorporated it in the state of New York on 27 November 1906 as the National Association of Teachers of Singing. The first annual meeting of the new organization was held on 7 January 1908, at Steinway Hall in New York City. The English music critic and voice teacher Herman Klein (1856–1934) was the first chairman. Founding members included Enrico Caruso, Emma Eames, Geraldine Farrar, Mary Garden, Ernestine Schumann-Heink and Marcella Sembrich.

In 1917 the association changed its name to the New York Singing Teachers' Association (NYSTA). In 1924 Miss M. E. DeWitt reported that the NYSTA "has adopted Daniel Jones's English Pronouncing Dictionary," based on standard pronunciation in England at that time. H. L. Mencken commented that Jones himself had said, "Personally, I cannot think that any attempt to introduce this pronunciation into America is likely to meet with success." When Rudy Vallée rose to prominence in 1930s, the NYSTA said of his style of singing, "crooning corrupts the minds and ideals of the younger generation." In 1944 the NYSTA, the American Academy of Teachers of Singing and the Chicago Singing Teachers Guild founded the National Association of Teachers of Singing.

George Jellinek hosted a weekly syndicated radio feature in New York that played opera and classical music for many years from 1968. He described the NYSTA as "a very congenial and worthwhile group". The NYSTA made Jellinek guest speaker and interviewer at their annual meetings. At these events Jellinek interviewed such people as Grace Bumbry, Jerry Hadley, Judith Blegen, Simon Estes and Deborah Voigt.

== Activities ==
The organization publishes the VOICEPrints journal five times a year. NYSTA offers online courses leading to the Distinguished Voice Professional certificate. Courses cover subjects such as Vocal Anatomy and Physiology, Voice Acoustics and Resonance, Vocal Health for Voice Professionals, Singers Development Repertoire and Comparative Voice Pedagogy. Members may be local, national or international.

== Sources ==
- Barronjan, James (2010-07-29). "George Jellinek, WQXR Opera Host, Dies at 90". The New York Times.
- Hoch, Matthew (2014-04-28). A Dictionary for the Modern Singer. Scarecrow Press. ISBN 978-0-8108-8656-8.
- Jellinek, George (2007-02-28). My Road to Radio and The Vocal Scene: Memoir of an Opera Commentator. McFarland. ISBN 978-0-7864-2823-6.
- Mencken, H.L. (2012-04-04). American Language Supplement 2. Knopf Doubleday Publishing Group. ISBN 978-0-307-81344-2.
- Nachman, Gerald (2000). Raised on Radio. University of California Press. ISBN 978-0-520-22303-5.
- Ringel, Harvey (1990). History of the National Association of Teachers of Singing. Jacksonville, Florida: NATS, Inc. ISBN 0-932761-01-1.
- Stemple, Joseph C.; Glaze, Leslie E.; Gerdeman, Bernice K. (2000). Clinical Voice Pathology: Theory and Management. Cengage Learning. ISBN 0-7693-0005-7.
