= Winnebago Man =

2009 film by Ben Steinbauer

- Theatrical release poster
- Directed by: Ben Steinbauer
- Written by: Malcolm Pullinger; Ben Steinbauer
- Produced by: Joel Heller; Malcolm Pullinger; Ben Steinbauer
- Starring: Jack Rebney; Ben Steinbauer; Keith Gordon; Nick Prueher; Joe Pickett; Douglas Rushkoff; Charlie Sotelo; Cinco Barnes; Alan Berliner; Mike Mitchell; Alexsey Vayner
- Cinematography: Bradley Beesley; Berndt Mader
- Edited by: Malcolm Pullinger
- Music by: Lyman Hardy; Andrew Hoke; Taylor Holland
- Distributed by: Kino International
- Release dates: March 14, 2009 (SXSW); July 9, 2010 (United States)
- Running time: 85 minutes
- Country: United States
- Language: English

Winnebago Man is a 2009 American documentary film directed by Ben Steinbauer. The film follows the Internet phenomenon created by a series of twenty-year-old outtakes from a Winnebago sales video featuring profane outbursts from a salesperson named Jack Rebney. Originally intended as an inside joke, the video spread across the globe—first on VHS, and then via YouTube and other online video sites, earning the salesman the title of "The Angriest Man in the World". The documentary explores the story of the clips' origins and how, two decades later, they affected the reluctant star.

Steinbauer released a short film entitled Extraordinarily Unusual: Surprising the Winnebago Man in 2017, documenting his return to visit Rebney on his 87th birthday, bringing some of Rebney's old friends to celebrate.

Rebney died on May 10, 2023, at the age of 93.

== Synopsis ==
The documentary starts with Steinbauer's obsession with a widely circulated viral video featuring outtakes from an RV commercial shoot centered on a cantankerous pitchman, Jack Rebney, a former broadcast journalist. In the video, Rebney regularly becomes outraged and flustered, cursing in colorful mannerisms. Steinbauer researches the footage and discovers it had been circulating on VHS long before it appeared on the Internet. He tracks down the original crew of the video, who explain that the shoot was a particularly frustrating experience, and, as a result of the outtakes, Rebney got fired, and they never saw him again.

With the help of a private detective, Steinbauer ultimately tracks down the infamous "Winnebago Man": Steinbauer visits Rebney at his home in a remote mountain area in California. Steinbauer is surprised to find Rebney calm, congenial, and articulate—in stark contrast to the angry, profane man in the famous video. Rebney claims to be indifferent and amused about the video and its popularity on the Internet. Steinbauer returns home disappointed.

A week later, however, Rebney begins contacting Steinbauer and admits that he was not candid during their first encounter. He reveals that he has long been angry about the video and its notoriety because he does not want to be remembered that way. Steinbauer learns that Rebney was once a news broadcaster and editor who left the industry embittered by the decline in “real news” and the rise of opinion-based news and punditry; additionally, Rebney reveals that he now has strong political opinions that he wants to share. Rebney invites Steinbauer for a second visit, but before this takes place, local papers report that Rebney had gone missing for a time while taking a walk. When Steinbauer makes his second visit to Rebney's home, a now openly cantankerous Rebney explains that he is now legally blind.

Rebney gives a series of often profane but articulate interviews to Steinbauer. He refuses to discuss personal matters but instead wants to make political speeches about subjects that make him angry, such as Dick Cheney and Walmart. Eventually, Steinbauer convinces Rebney to attend the Found Footage Festival in San Francisco. There, fans have lined up for a sold-out screening of the original video featuring Rebney. The fans describe Rebney's positive impact on them. During the screening, the festival organizers invite Rebney onstage as a special guest, and he wittily engages the audience. After the screening, Rebney meets several fans who request autographs and express how viewing the old footage cheers them up after a hard day.

Later that night, Rebney muses to an old friend that his fans are more intelligent than he anticipated. The filmmakers and Rebney's friend drive him home the next day. Rebney's friend tells him, "You made a lot of people happy this weekend." Rebney replies by acknowledging that he takes some small degree of pride in how, for many people, he represents the human condition in the face of adversity.

== Distribution ==
The film premiered at The South by Southwest Film Festival in Austin, Texas, on March 14, 2009.

Kino International (Kino Lorber) acquired American theatrical and home video rights in March 2010 and released the film nationally in US theaters on July 9, 2010, and on DVD on November 2, 2010. The movie opened theatrically at the Landmark Sunshine Cinema in New York, before expanding nationally. KinoSmith acquired Canadian and American theatrical, television, and home video rights in May 2010 and released the film nationally in Canadian theaters on September 10, 2010, and on DVD on November 9, 2010.

A sixty-minute version of Winnebago Man was aired in the United Kingdom on BBC Four on August 30, 2010, as part of the Storyville series of documentaries. On August 12, 2011, Winnebago Man premiered on the Internet for free viewing in the U.S. for two weeks on Hulu and SnagFilms.

== Awards ==
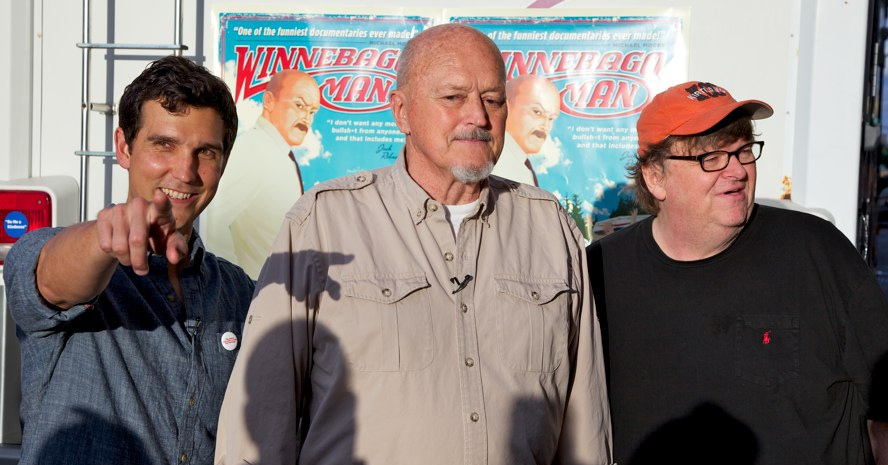
Ben Steinbauer, Jack Rebney, and Michael Moore at the film's premiere in July 2010

- Grand Jury Prize for Best Documentary, Sarasota Film Festival
- Audience Award for Best Documentary, CineVegas Film Festival
- Top Ten Audience Favorite, Hot Docs Film Festival
- Founders Prize, Best Comedy Documentary, Traverse City Film Festival
- Grand Jury Prize, Best Documentary at the Edmonton International Film Festival

Winnebago Man was also in the official selection for IDFA and Sheffield Doc/Fest.

The Austin Film Critics Association named Winnebago Man the Best Austin Film for 2010.

== Critical reception ==
On Rotten Tomatoes, the film has an approval rating of 90% based on 62 reviews, with an average rating of 7.1/10. The website's critical consensus reads: "Though it doesn't quite answer all of the questions it raises, Winnebago Man is nevertheless a fascinating, hilarious, and surprisingly poignant look at a geniunely [sic] colorful internet celebrity."

== See also ==
- Bjorn Rebney
- The Show with No Name
- Ephemera § Video and audio ephemera
- Internet meme
- Industrial film
