= Studio 19 =

Coordinates: 35.9610°N 86.8207°W

Studio 19, originally named Music City Recorders, is a music studio in Nashville, Tennessee. It was founded in late 1964 by Bill Connor and Scotty Moore, original guitar player for Elvis Presley. Originally located on Nashville's Music Row, the studio relocated in 2015 after the original building was sold and demolished.

In 1968, the studio completed a $100,000 expansion project that included the installation of an 8-track recording facility.

In 1970, Beatles drummer Ringo Starr recorded the solo album Beaucoups of Blues at the studio, with Moore as engineer. A few weeks later, the studio completed the purchase of the land and building it occupied, with the intention of expanding the building within the coming years. Plans for the expansion were announced in December of that year.

In 1974, the studio was purchased by brothers Jack and Bud Logan of the Shannon music label. Jack Logan took over engineering while Bud became the producer for acts from the Shannon label.

In 1982, the studio was sold to the SiJohn Music Group and renamed Studio 19.

In 1984, the studio was sold to current owners Larry Rogers and Pat Brewer.

The studio's original building was sold and demolished in 2015. Studio 19 relocated to the complex at Sound Kitchen, in Franklin, Tennessee.
