= On Wings of Song (Mendelssohn) =

Music by Felix Mendelssohn

"On Wings of Song" (German: "Auf Flügeln des Gesanges"), Op. 34, No. 2, MWV K 86, is a piece by Felix Mendelssohn, the second of his "six songs for voice and piano" (Opus 34-2, 1834). It is a setting of the poem Auf Flügeln des Gesanges by the German Romantic poet Heinrich Heine published in his Buch der Lieder in 1827.

== Adaptations ==
Mendelssohn - On Wings of Song, Op. 34, No. 2
performed by the Park Sisters

Accordion orchestra arrangement
Performed by Paul De Bra

Franz Liszt arranged "On Wings of Song" for solo piano (S. 547).

The song has been translated into other languages and has been adopted in school music textbooks all over the world.

The song "Till My Love Comes to Me" (Paul Francis Webster), based on Mendelssohn's "On Wings of Song", sung by Doris Day, is included in the album Young at Heart.
