= Ephemera =

Transient items but collected nonetheless

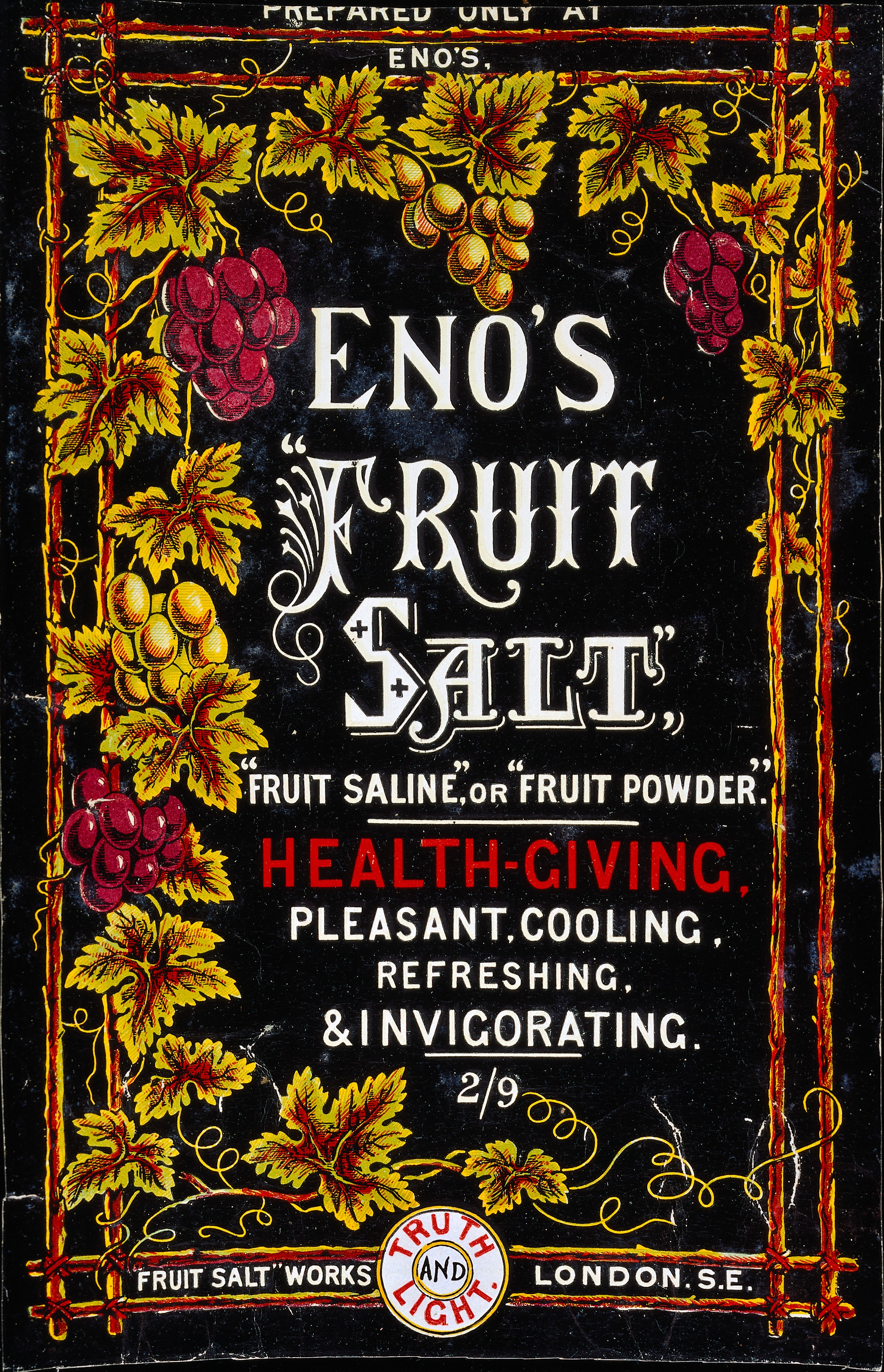
A historical example of ephemera

Ephemera (from Ancient Greek ἐφήμερος (ephēmeros) 'lasting only a day') are items which were not originally designed to be retained or preserved, but have been collected or retained. The word is both plural and singular.

One definition for ephemera is "the minor transient documents of everyday life". Ephemera are often paper-based, printed items, including menus, ticket stubs, newspapers, postcards, posters, sheet music, stickers, and greeting cards. However, since the 1990s, the term has been used to refer to digital artefacts or texts.

Since the printing revolution, ephemera has been a long-standing element of everyday life. Some ephemera are ornate in their design, acquiring prestige, whereas others are minimal and notably utilitarian. Virtually all conceptions of ephemera make note of the object's disposability.

Collectors and special interest societies have contributed to a greater willingness to preserve ephemera, which is now ubiquitous in archives and library collections. Ephemera have become a source for humanities research, as ephemera reveal the sociological, historical, cultural, and anthropological contexts of their production and preservation.

== Etymology and categorisation ==
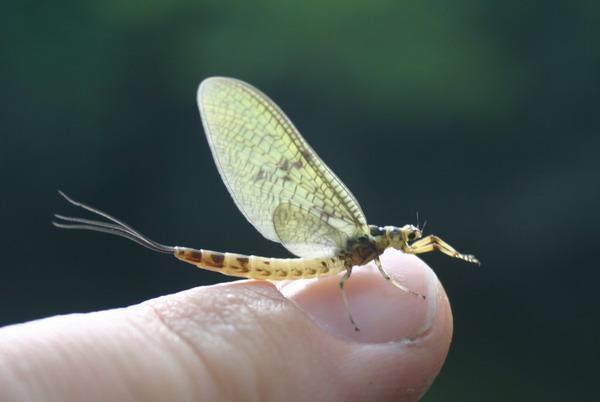
The mayfly Ephemera danica

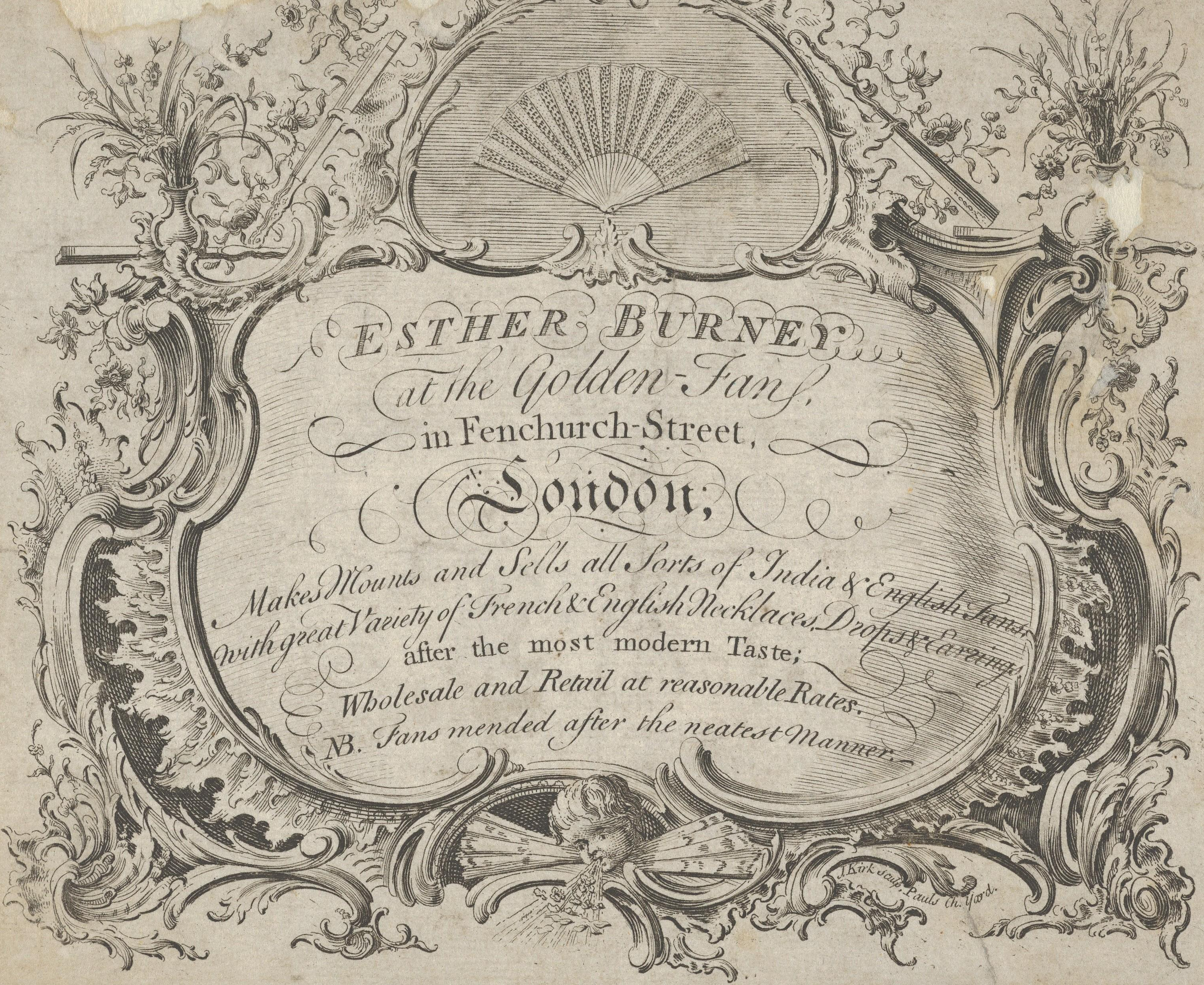
A piece of ephemera circa 1749–1751, around the time Samuel Johnson may have coined the term

The etymological origin of Ephemera (ἐφήμερα) is the Greek epi (ἐπί) – "on, for" and hemera (ἡμέρα) – "day". This combination generated the term ephemeron in neuter gender; the neuter plural form is ephemera, the source of the modern word, which can be traced back to the works of Aristotle. The initial sense extended to the mayfly and other short-lived insects and flowers, belonging to the biological order Ephemeroptera.

In 1751, Samuel Johnson used the term ephemerae in reference to "the papers of the day". This application of ephemera has been cited as the first example of aligning it with transient prints. Ephemeral, by the mid-19th century, began to be used to generically refer to printed items.

Ephemera and ephemerality have mutual connotations of "passing time, change, and the philosophically ultimate vision of our own existence". The degree to which ephemera is ephemeral is due in part to the value bestowed upon it. Over time, the ephemerality of certain ephemera may change, as items fall in and out of fashion or popularity with collectors. Comic books, for example, were once considered ephemera; however, that perception later faded.

As a conceptual category, ephemera has interested scholars. Henry Jenkins has argued that the emergence of ephemera, and the interest that some people show in collecting items that other people throw away, showcases the immaterial nature of culture arising in daily life. Rick Prelinger noted that when a piece of ephemera is preserved, and greater value is placed upon it, the object then arguably stops being ephemera.

Categorising types of ephemera has presented difficulties to fixed systems in library science and historiography due to the ambiguity of the kinds of items that might be included. A piece of ephemera's purpose, field of use and geography are among the various elements relevant to its categorisation. Challenges pertaining to ephemera include determining its creator, purpose, date and location of origin and impact thereof. Determining its worth in a present context, distinct from its perhaps obscured purpose, is also of interest.

The breadth of printed ephemera is vast and varied, often eluding simple definition. Librarians often conflate ephemera with grey literature whereas collectors often broaden the scope and definition of ephemera. José Esteban Muñoz considered the characteristics of ephemera to be subversion and social experience; Alison Byerly described ephemera as the response to cultural trends. Wasserman, who defined ephemera as "objects destined for disappearance or destruction", categorised the following as ephemera:

- air transport labels
- bank checks
- bingo cards
- bookmarks
- broadsides
- bus tickets
- catalogs
- envelopes
- flyers
- maps
- menus
- newspapers
- pamphlets
- paper dolls
- postcards
- receipts
- sheet music
- stamps
- theater programs
- ticket stubs
- valentines

Further items that have been categorised as ephemera include: posters, album covers, ream wrappers, meeting minutes, buttons, stickers, financial records and personal memorabilia; announcements of events in a life, such as a birth, a death, a graduation or marriage, have been described as ephemera. Textual material, uniformly, could be considered ephemera. Artistic ephemera include sand paintings, sculptures composed of intentionally transient material, graffiti, and guerrilla art. Historically, there have been various categories of ephemera. Genres may be defined by function or encompass and detail a specific item. Over 500 categories are listed in The Encyclopedia of Ephemera, ranging from the 18th to 20th century.

== Forms ==
There is scarcely a subject that has not generated its own ephemera.

— Rickards and, the librarian, Julie Anne Lambert

=== Printed ephemera ===
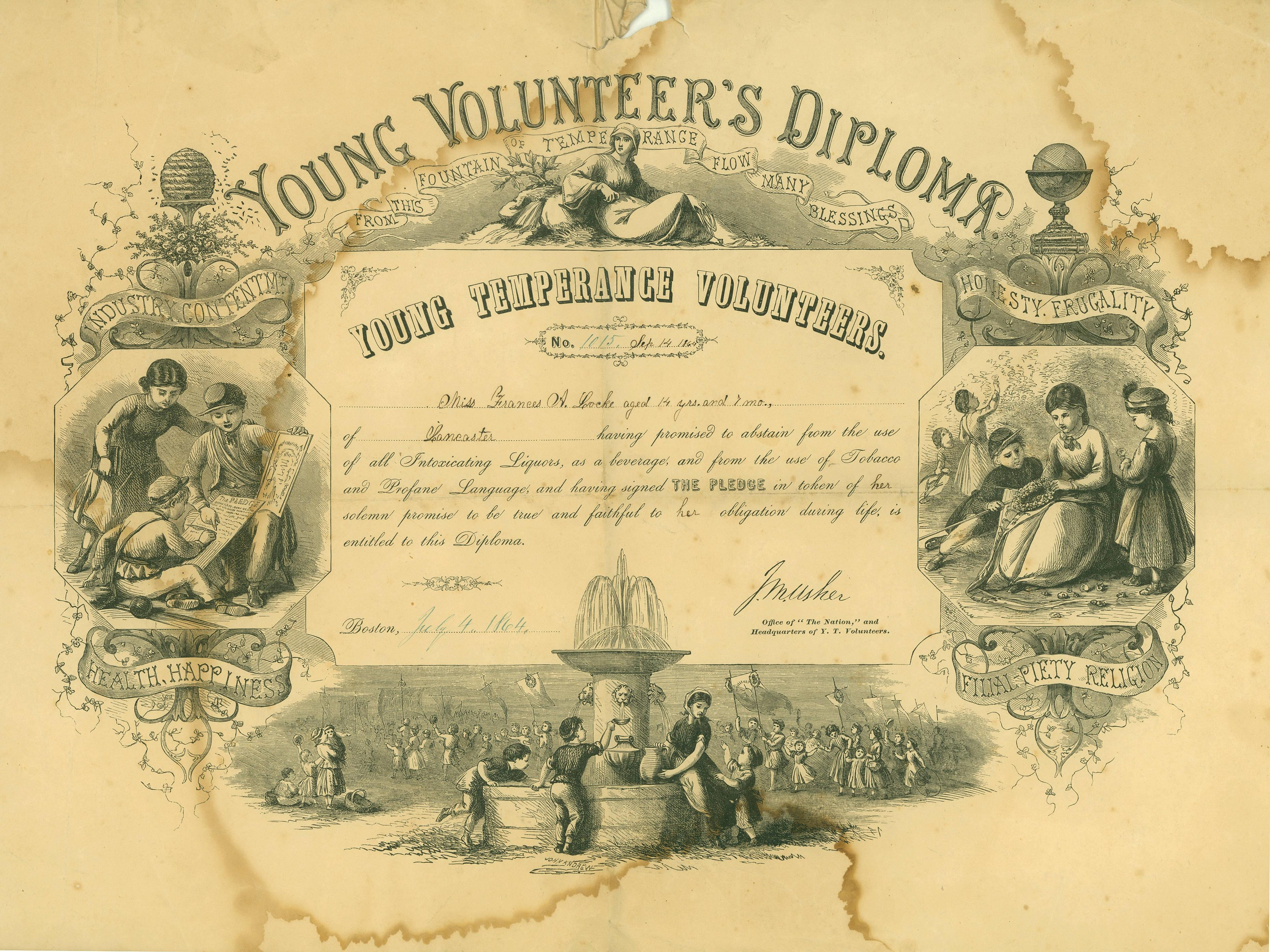
The temperance movement generated a vast amount of ephemera

Commonly, printed ephemera is seen to not exceed "more than thirty-two pages in length", although some understandings are more broadly encompassing. (Note: A qualifier from the National Library of Australia, devised in 1992, virtually excluded material of more than five pages.) Ephemera is chiefly observed as single page materials, with variance and repeat characteristics. The material usage of printed ephemera is very often minimal and much are without art, although a distinct design lexicon can be found in pieces. Early ephemera, functionally monochromatic and predominantly textual, indicates a greater access to printing from common people and later cheap photography. 17th century ephemera incorporated administrative elements and more visuals. Advertising and information are among the primary elements of ephemera; design elements, which are typically indicative of the period of origin, such as the Renaissance, likely changed in accordance to higher literacy rates. (Note: Display typefaces were an advertising component present prominently in 19th-century ephemera.) The prose of ephemera could range from pithy to relatively long (~400 words, for example). By the 19th century, color printing was present, as were vivid, creative, innovative and ornate design, due to the incorporation of lithography. The modern ephemera of duplicating machines and photocopiers are chiefly informative. Ephemera's "generic legibility" was achieved through the use of visuals, a quality that was significantly democratised by ephemera.

Various forms of printed ephemera deteriorate quickly, a key element in definitions of ephemera. Although broad, pre-19th century ephemera has seldom survived. Much of ephemera was not intended to be disposed of. Assignats saw widespread contempt on account of their low-quality, endangering their survival rate. The temperance movement produced ubiquitous ephemera; some printed ephemera have had production quantities of millions, although quantifying the matter is often reliant upon limited yet vast approximation. (Note: Ephemera relating to beer, wine and drinking is vast and developed in accordance with drinking movements.) Such temperance ephemera was prominent enough to elicit contemporaneous sentimentality and disdain. By this point, ephemera was printed by various establishments, having likely become a major element of some.

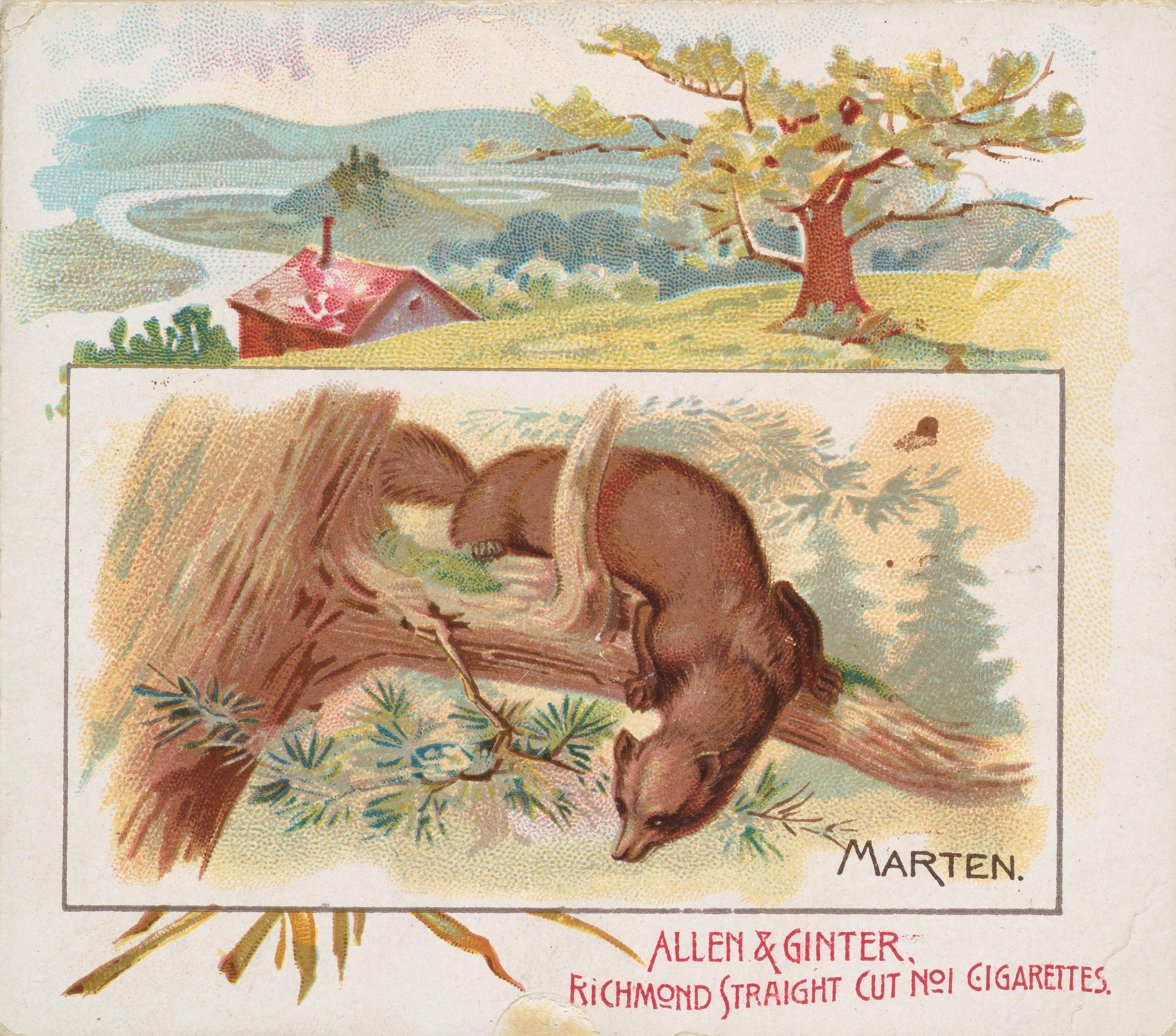
Smoking-related ephemera depicting a marten

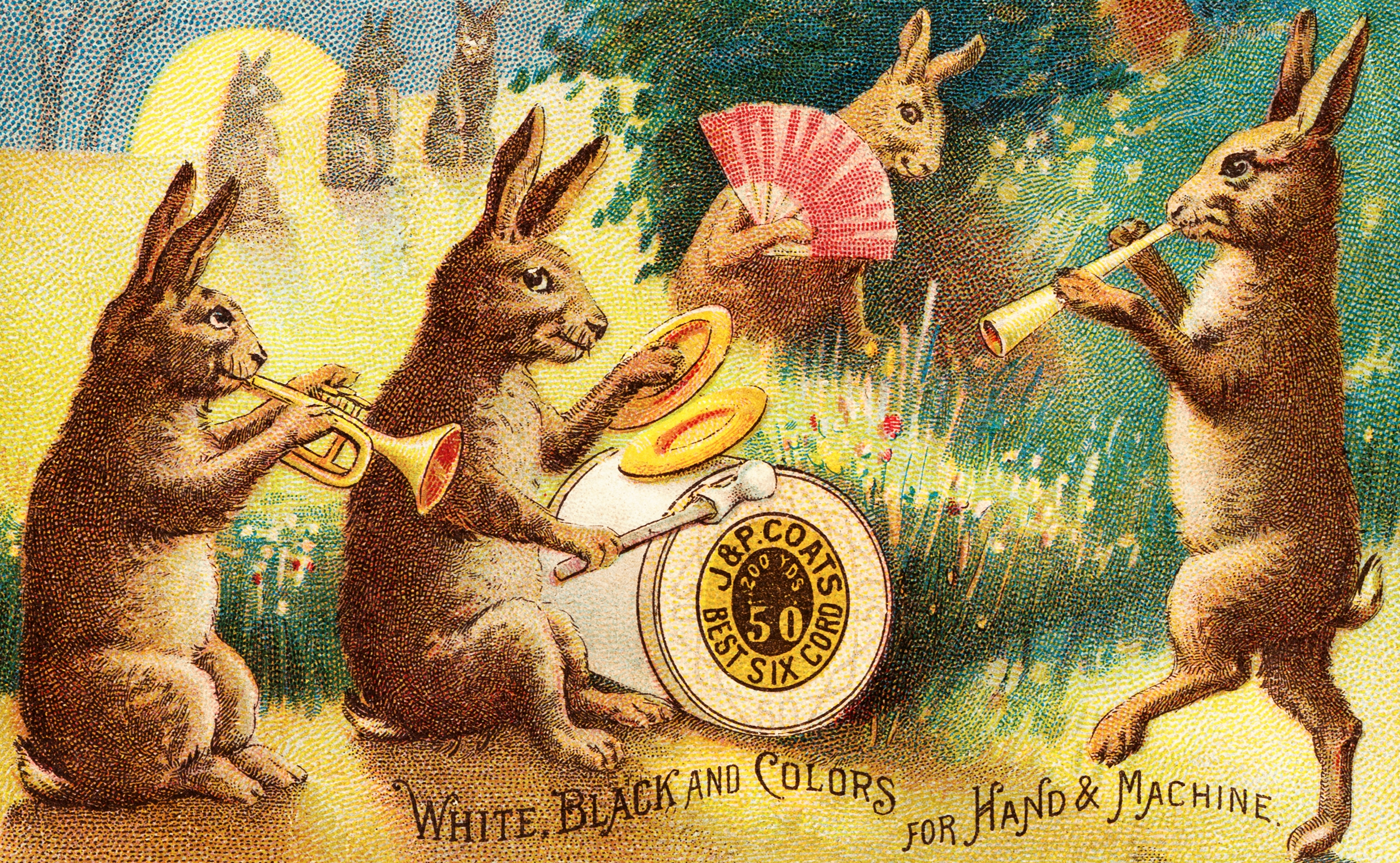
Created by Donaldson Brothers for J & P Coats

The mid-15th century has been identified as the origin of ephemera, following the Printing Revolution. Ephemera, such as religious indulgences, were significant in the early days of printing. The first mass-produced ephemera is presumed to be a variant of indulgences (~1454/55). Demand for ephemera corresponded with an increasing scale of towns whereupon they were commonly dispersed on streets. Ephemera has functioned as a substantial means of disseminating information, evident in public sectors such as tourism, finance, law and recreation and has "aided the proliferation of print media as an exchange of information". In their times, ephemera has been used for documentation, education, belligerence, critique and propaganda. (Note: Soon after, political propaganda arose as a category of ephemera.)

Lottery tickets, playbills and trade cards have been among the most prominent ephemera of eras, such as the Georgian and Civil War eras. Panoramic paintings were a far-reaching class of ephemera, few remaining as a result. Junk mail is a contemporary example of prominent ephemera. Ephemera's mundane ubiquity is a relatively modern phenomenon, evidenced by Henri Béraldi's amazed writings on their proliferation. Ubiquitous descriptions of printed ephemera have extended back to the 1840s and by the turn of the century, a time in which a deluge of ephemera had become commonplace, "readers [were] defined by their relationship with print ephemera". Discussing an increase in ephemera by the mid-19th century, E.S Dallas wrote that new etiquette had been introduced, thus "a new era" was to follow, espousing the impression that authorship and literature were no longer hermetic.

=== Digital ephemera ===
In 1998, librarian Richard Stone wrote that the internet "can be seen as the ultimate in ephemera with its vast amount of information and advertising which is extremely transitory and volatile in nature, and vulnerable to change or deletion". Multiple academics have described digital ephemera as being possibly more vulnerable than traditional forms. Internet memes and selfies have been described as forms of ephemera and various modern print ephemera features a digital component. Commonly printed ephemera increasingly only manifests digitally. The Tate Library defines "e-ephemera" as the digital-born content and paratext of an email, typically of a promotional variety, produced by cultural institutions; similar in nature, monographs, catalogues and micro-sites are excluded, per being considered e-books. Websites, such as those of an administrative nature, have seen description as ephemera. The likes of Instagram feature accounts dedicated to displaying graphically designed ephemera.

Digital ephemera is of comparable nature to printed ephemera, although it is even more prevalent and subject to altering perceptions of ephemera. Holly Callaghan of the Tate Library noted a proliferation of "e-ephemera"; an increased reliance upon this form of ephemera has engendered concern, with note to later accessibility and a difficulty to those outside of the intended recipients. Citing ostensibly infinite digital storage, Wasserman said that the category, ephemera, may cease to exist, its contents having been ultimately preserved.

== Collecting ==
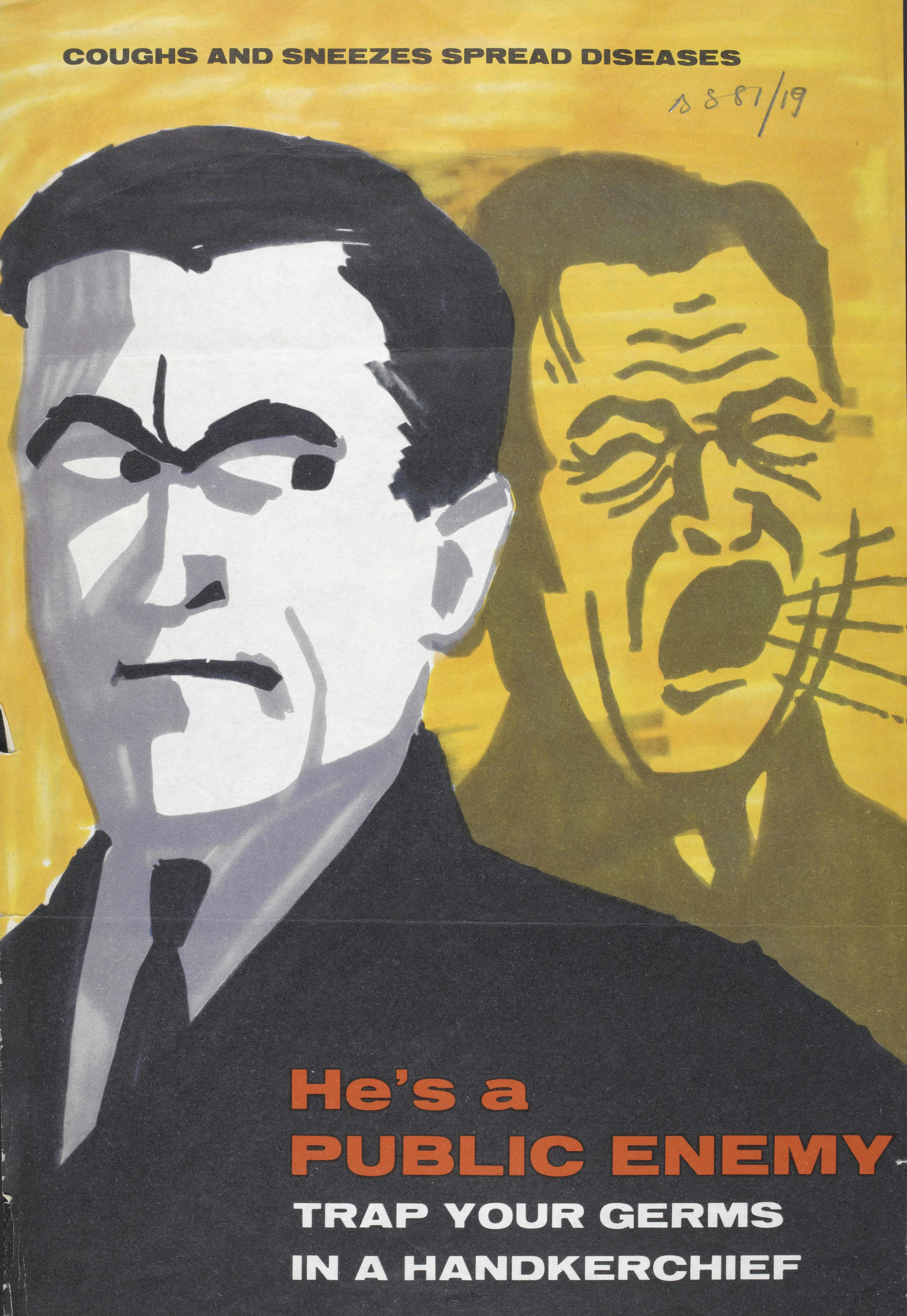
20th-century ephemera from the UK

Ephemera has long been substantially collected, both with and without intention, preserving what may be the only remaining reproductions. Victorian families pasted their collections of ephemera, acquiring the likes of scraps and trade cards, in scrapbooks whereas Georgian curators thoroughly archived ephemera. It was a private endeavour, with little outward cultural presence, although an eminent interpersonal function. Cigarette cards were widely collected, by-design. (Note: In an overview of ephemera, Rickards and Lambert wrote that the specification of cigarette cards as collectable means they should not be classified as ephemera, though rarely is this distinction acknowledged.)

Contemporarily, institutions have attempted to preserve digital ephemera, although problems may exist in regards to scope and interest. Ephemera has been considered for curation since the 1970s, due in part to collectors, at which point societies, professional associations and publications regarding ephemera arose. Although ephemera is a global occurrence, interest is chiefly present in Britain and America. Ephemera collections can be idiosyncratic, sequential and difficult to peruse.

Multiple scholars articulated a connection to the past, such as nostalgia, as a key motivation for ephemera collecting. Such a connection has been described as evocative and atmospheric; the memory as collective and cultural; the nostalgia as populist and the ephemera associated with melancholy. Aesthetics, academic advancement and existential ephemerality have also been seen as motivation.

=== Academia ===
The study of print ephemera has seen much contention; various viewpoints and interpretations have been proposed from scholars, with comparisons to folklore studies and popular culture studies, due to the invoking of "remembrance and echoed retellings" and contending that which is more prestigious, respectively. Literature around ephemera concern its production, varieties: trade cards, broadside ballads, chapbooks, almanacs, and newspapers; scholars predominately examine ephemera post-19th century due to greater quantities thereof. A significant amount of scholars have been collectors, archivists and amateurs, particularly at the inception of ephemera studies, a now burgeoning academic field. Digitisation of ephemera has provided accessibility and spurred renewed interest, following the "few writings" present at the start of the 21st century.

As a source, ephemera has been widely accepted. Ephemera has been credited with illustrating social dynamics, including daily life, communication, social mobility and the enforcement of social norms. Furthermore, varied cultures from differing groups can be assessed via ephemera. (Note: Following the California Gold Rush of 1849, by means of visual ephemera, the citizens of San Francisco, regardless of race or class, "were exposed to one another".) Ephemera, to Rickards, documents "the other side of history...[which] contains all sorts of human qualities that would otherwise be edited out".

== See also ==
- Bibliothèque Bleue
- Disposable product
- Ephemeris
- Ephemeral
- Ephemera Society of America
- Found Footage Festival
- Prelinger Archives
- The Show with No Name
