= Mark St. Laurent =

American opera singer

Mark St. Laurent is an American bass-baritone and served on the Voice Faculty at New England Conservatory from 1989 to 2013. He has sung extensively in oratorio and opera, both in the United States and Europe. He has appeared as a soloist at the Aspen Music Festival, Bach Aria Festival, Boston Lyric Opera, Lake George Opera, Monadnock Music, Indian Hill Symphony, and the Liederkranz Foundation. His past opera performances have included La Bohème, Madame Butterfly, Die Zauberflöte, Don Giovanni, The Barber of Seville, and The Elixir of Love.

He is a voice instructor at the Groton School in Groton, Massachusetts.

He holds a Bachelor of Music degree and a Master of Music degree from Indiana University School of Music.

== Sources ==
- New England Conservatory Staff biography
