= Ream wrapper =

Paper product

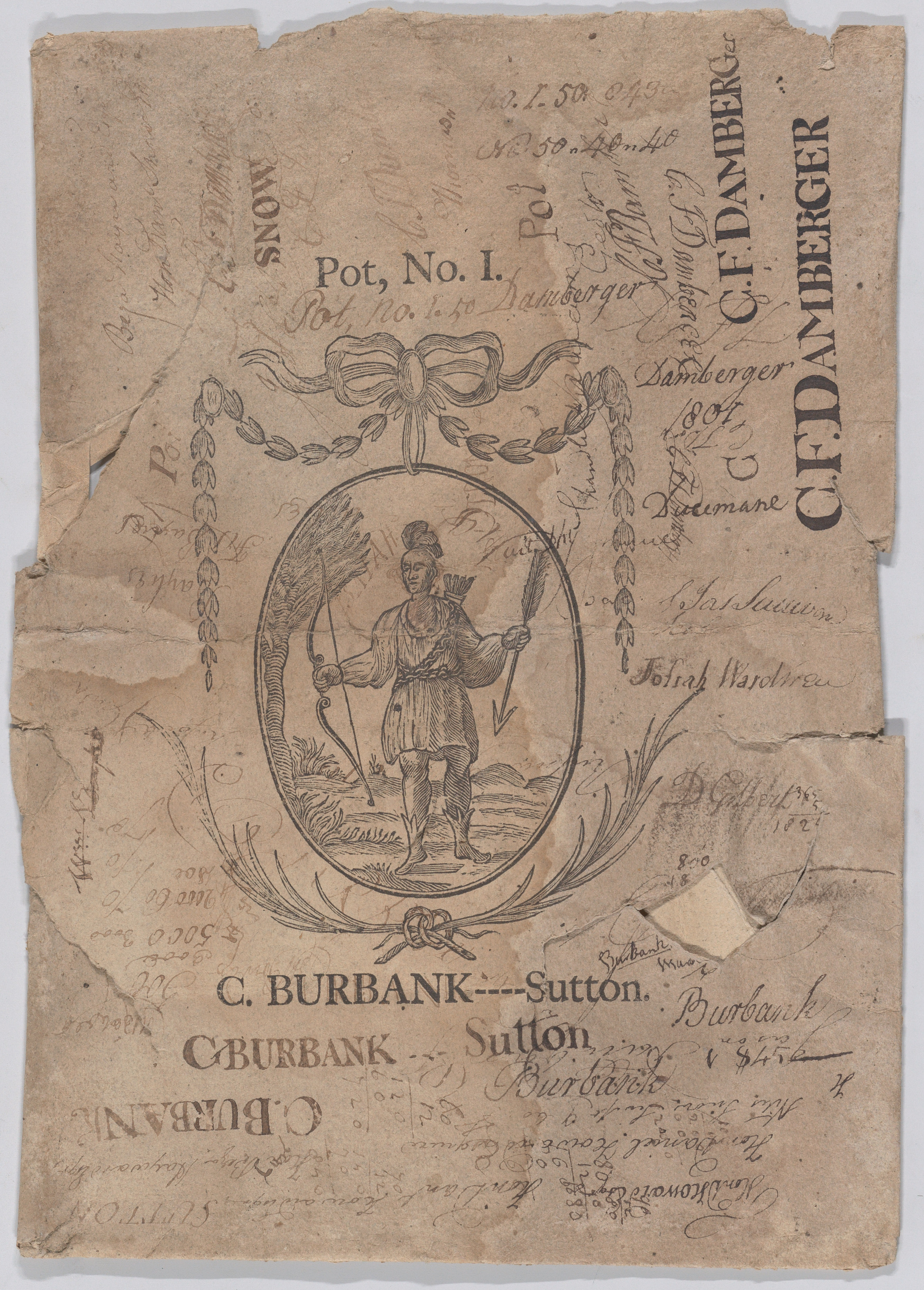
A ream wrapper for the Burbank paper mill in Sutton, MA. This ream wrapper has been repurposed as a sheet of scrap paper.

Ream wrappers are sheets of paper used for packaging reams of paper. As most historical ream wrappers from Europe and America were printed with a pictorial label, they are generally classified as graphic ephemera in museum and special collections. The oldest extant ream wrapper labels are printed from woodcuts. In the eighteenth and nineteenth centuries, labels were also produced via engraving on wood, copper, and steel.

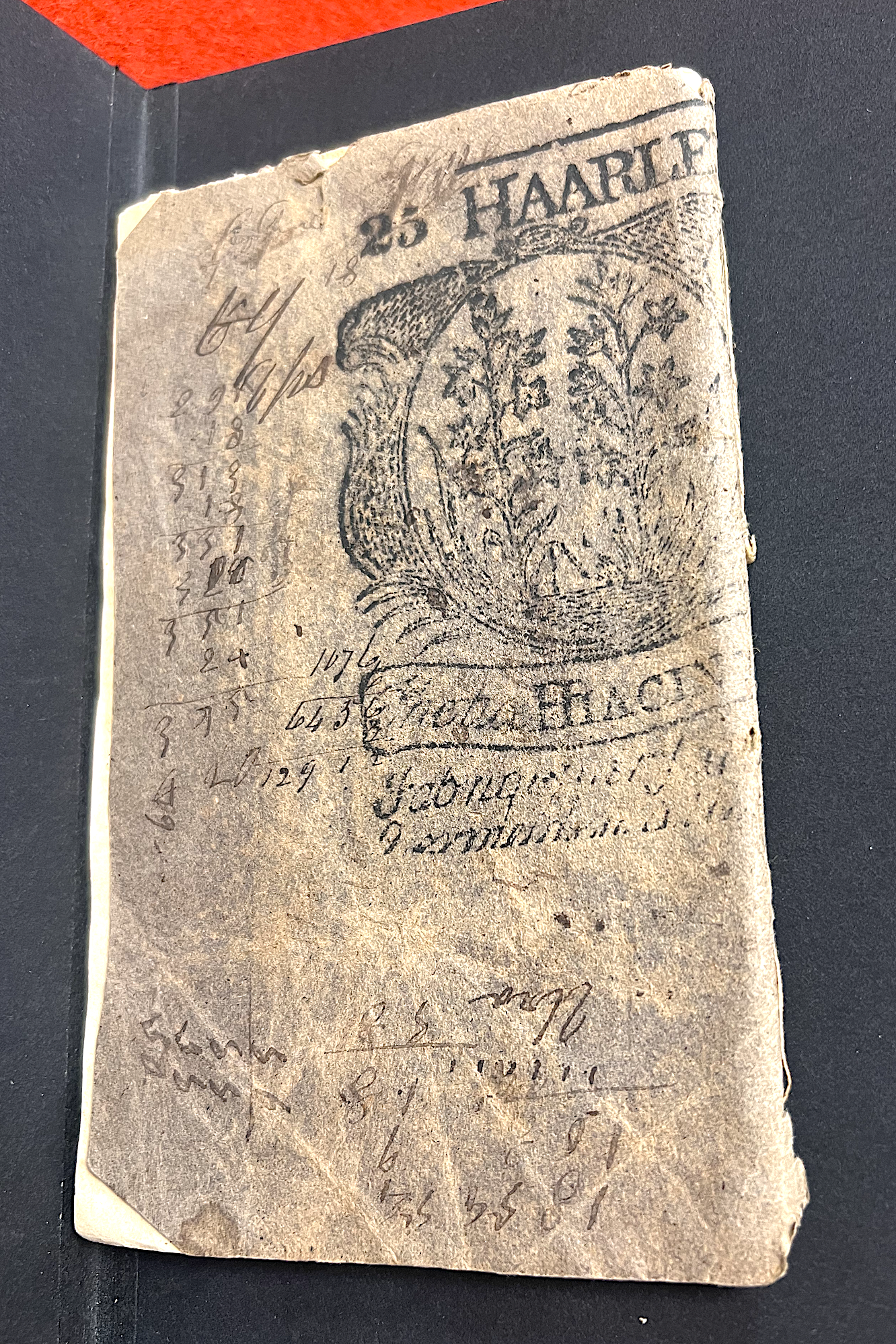
An American account book from the nineteenth century, bound in a Dutch ream wrapper. This item is held by the American Antiquarian Society.

In traditional paper mills, apprentices produced paper for ream wrappers at the end of the day, as it was not necessary for this paper to have an even consistency or color. Pulp for ream wrapper paper was made with dirty, worn, or colored rags unsuitable for the making of finer paper, as well as with waste paper scraps and cuttings. Occasionally, labels were printed on small pieces of fine paper, which were then affixed to the rougher packaging paper. While ream wrappers were meant to be discarded, they were sometimes repurposed as scrap paper, covers for homemade account or recipe books, or as end-paper in case-bound books.

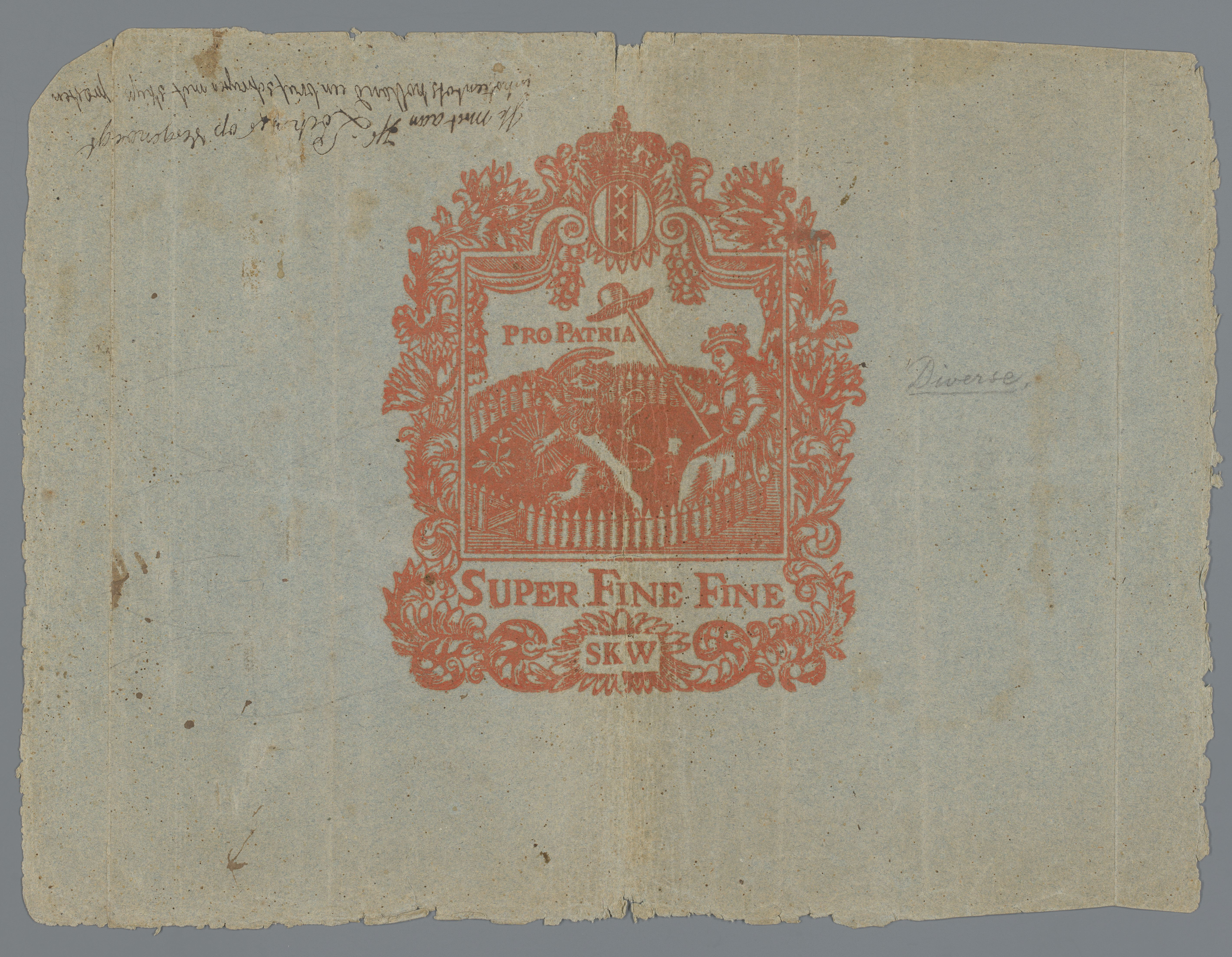
A Dutch ream wrapper with the Pro Patria motif, c. 1750–1800.

Ream wrappers may be used to identify the location, layout, and scale of historical paper mills. However, they have not been studied as extensively as watermarks because extant ream wrappers are less common.
