= The Show with No Name =

American television show

- Starring: Charlie Sotelo
- Country of origin: United States
- Original language: English

Original release
- Release: 1995 – 2005

The Show with No Name is a public-access television cable TV show that aired in Austin, Texas, hosted by Charlie Sotelo and the mysterious "Cinco." Each show featured clips of TV, film and music ephemera along with commentary by the hosts and calls from a predictably unruly public-access television audience.

== Content ==
The clips were usually video snippets that captured bizarre moments of ephemeral history, such as Ed McMahon drunk on The Tonight Show, an early live TV appearance by Frank Zappa playing the bicycle and other found instruments, or the famously disastrous Andy Kaufman appearance on Fridays. Often they were obscure cult favorites only circulated underground, such as Heavy Metal Parking Lot, the profane bloopers of an actor in a Winnebago sales video, or notorious promotional film Corey Haim: Me, Myself, and I. Many other clips simply presented a zeitgeist gone by: a trailer for an Akira Kurosawa or Sam Peckinpah film, a Bill Hicks comedy set, or Bob Dylan appearing on The Johnny Cash Show.

== Format ==
Each clip was bracketed by skits and banter among hosts Charlie (always shown in a static headshot against a black background), Cinco (shown from the back at a sound console), and occasionally viewers who called in. Cinco, whose face is never shown on-air, had both a voice and a haircut similar to Howard Stern's -- this was never explained or commented on in the show, humorously creating the false impression that Cinco was Stern, slumming on local cable.

"The 10-year-old kid" (Luke Adams) was a recurring caller who would tell a Bill Hicks joke every time he was on air. During a Christmas episode Adams went live on air with Charlie and took viewer calls. Later, Adams also performed live at the Alamo Drafthouse for a Show With No Name Clip Show.

== Impact and legacy ==
The show ran for 280 episodes over 8 years and won eight "Best of Austin" awards, as chosen by the editors and readers of The Austin Chronicle. It launched a series of popular live clip shows at the Alamo Drafthouse theater, including Raw, Uncensored and Totally Nude, which featured clips that the hosts deemed too controversial to air. It often courted controversy and was pulled from the air on at least two occasions. Its audience of local fans and out-of-towners traded tapes. It received no advertising, and its webpage showed only a plain black page with a logo and no links or text (except when promoting a special event). In a time before YouTube, the show gave a weekly forum to video fragments of moments that may have otherwise been lost to time and obscurity.
