= High Hopes (American TV series) =

American TV series

- Genre: Reality television
- Created by: Slava and Mishka
- Country of origin: United States
- Original language: English
- No. of seasons: 1
- No. of episodes: 6

Production
- Production companies: Kimmelot; ITV America

Original release
- Network: Hulu

High Hopes is an American television series that debuted on Hulu on April 20, 2024. The docuseries follows two brothers who operate a cannabis retail outlet in Los Angeles, California. Jimmy Kimmel is an executive producer.
