= Stairway to Stardom =

US public-access television program

- Also known as: The Frank Masi Show; The Frank Masi Nostalgia Show
- Created by: Frank Masi
- Directed by: Steve Feldman
- Presented by: Frank Masi; Tillie Masi
- Opening theme: Songs To Remember
- Composer: Evie Day
- Country of origin: United States
- Original language: English

Production
- Running time: 30 minutes

Stairway to Stardom was a public-access television series that aired in New York City from 1979 through the early 1990s. It was described by NPR as "an amateur talent show many see as a low-rent precursor to American Idol. Taped "in what appeared to be a freshly carpeted Staten Island basement," the host Frank Masi would bring on amateur singers, dancers, actors, and comedians to perform. Describing the show, The A.V. Club's "Found Footage" segment said that "without exaggeration, it was one of the greatest shows ever to be on television."

== Legacy ==
Clips and full shows have appeared on various social media and gained a cult following. The disco-style opening theme song was performed by Steve Luisi and All The King's Men and written by their keyboard player, Ben Stiefel.

A 2017 play performed at the HERE Arts Center was based on the series.
