= On Wings of Song (poem) =

"On Wings of Song" (German: "Auf Flügeln des Gesanges") is a poem by the German Romantic poet Heinrich Heine. It was published in Buch der Lieder in 1827.

== Musical settings ==
Felix Mendelssohn set it to music as the second of his "six songs for voice and piano" (Opus 34-2, 1834). Franz Liszt arranged On Wings of Music for solo piano (S. 547). His song has been translated into other languages and has been adopted in school music textbooks for China, Japan and Korea.

Other settings include that by Franz Lachner.

== Poem ==
German

Auf Flügeln des Gesanges,
Herzliebchen, trag' ich dich fort,
Fort nach den Fluren des Ganges,
Dort weiß ich den schönsten Ort.

Dort liegt ein rotblühender Garten
Im stillen Mondenschein;
Die Lotosblumen erwarten
Ihr trautes Schwesterlein.

Die Veilchen kichern und kosen,
Und schaun nach den Sternen empor;
Heimlich erzählen die Rosen
Sich duftende Märchen ins Ohr.

Es hüpfen herbei und lauschen
Die frommen, klugen Gazell'n;
Und in der Ferne rauschen
Des heiligen Stromes Well'n.

Dort wollen wir niedersinken
Unter dem Palmenbaum,
Und Liebe und Ruhe trinken,
Und träumen seligen Traum.

English

On Wings of Song,
Sweetheart, I carry you away,
Away to the fields of the Ganges,
Where I know the most beautiful place.

There is a garden of red flax
In the quiet moonlight;
The lotus flowers
await their charming little sister.

The violets giggle and caress,
And gaze up at the stars;
Secretly the roses tell each other
Fragrant fairy-stories.

The pious, wise gazelles;
Hop near and listen
And far away
The sacred river's waves roar.

There we will lie down
Under the palm tree
Drink in peace and love
And dream our blissful dream.
