= Jo Estill =

American singer (1921–2010)

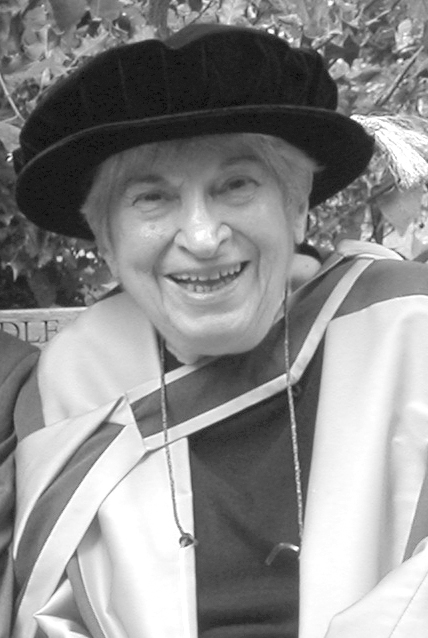
- At the award of her honorary doctorate in London in 2004
- Born: Josephine Antoinette Vadala; April 25, 1921; Donora, Pennsylvania, United States
- Died: December 9, 2010 (aged 89); Santa Rosa, California, United States
- Known for: Voice research and the development of Estill Voice Training

Josephine Antoinette Estill (née Vadala; April 25, 1921 – December 9, 2010), known as Jo Estill, was an American singer, singing voice specialist and voice researcher. Estill is best known for her research and the development of Estill Voice Training, a programme for developing vocal skills based on deconstructing the process of vocal production into control of specific structures in the vocal mechanism.

== Biography ==
Josephine Antoinette Vadala was born on April 25, 1921, in Donora, Pennsylvania, United States. She sang professionally on the radio in Pittsburgh from 1939 to 1940, and from 1940 to 1947 in Hollywood. After marrying Thomas Estill of Colorado Springs, she toured Europe in 1953 with a lieder concert tour including programmes in The Hague, Amsterdam, Copenhagen, Oslo, London, Zurich, Geneva and Paris. Estill then had 13 years of performance as a soloist in Colorado Springs, Colorado, with the Air Force Academy Choral Concerts, Colorado Springs Symphony, Colorado Springs Opera as Dido Sr. Angelica, Aida, Tosca, among others.

In 1969, Estill received a BA in liberal arts from Colorado College, Colorado Springs, and in 1971, Estill received an MA in music education from Case Western Reserve University in Cleveland, Ohio. During her studies at Case Western Reserve University, Estill took 30 hours of speech and hearing elective classes, marking her introduction to voice science.

From 1972–1979, Estill was appointed instructor in voice in the Department of Otolaryngology, at the Upstate Medical Center, Syracuse, New York. It was here that Estill worked under Dr. Ray Colton, and Dr. David Brewer, two of the top voice researchers in the United States and began her pioneering research on her six voice qualities: speech, falsetto, sob, twang, opera, and belt. Colton, Brewer and Estill presented many papers on their research to the 'Care of the Professional Voice' conferences of the Voice Foundation.

Between 1980 and 1984, Jo enrolled in the City University of New York PhD graduate programme in speech and hearing. She completed all of her PhD course work and withdrew without submitting her dissertation. It was Dr. Osamu Fujimura at Ohio State University at Columbus, who assisted to gather necessary data for Jo to develop her research on her own.

Estill's interests and voice research led to the development of Estill Voice Training and in 1991 Estill founded the company 'Estill Voice Training Systems' to protect the work and begin uniform certification of instructors.

On September 10, 2004, Estill was awarded an Honorary Doctorate, Doctor of Letters (LittD), from the University of East Anglia.

Estill died in Santa Rosa, California, on December 9, 2010, of natural causes.

== Research ==
Estill studied various qualities associated with different styles of singing, using techniques including EMG, electroglottography, voice signal analysis, X-rays of the phonating larynx, laryngeal fibre endoscopy, acoustic measurements and simultaneous videostroboscopy. This led to the development of a series of exercises to develop specific control over individual muscle groups and structures in the vocal mechanism. For example, Estill's endoscopic video recordings of the vocal tract during voicing demonstrated deconstruction techniques such as the 'silent laugh' that encourage the false vocal folds to retract. These exercises are now included within the Estill Voice Training system.

Jo is so committed to uncovering the mysteries of the voice that she agreed to have 12 needles inserted in her mouth, throat, and voice musculature. To make the readings accurate, she refused anesthetic. It was the first time and only time this research has been done. Try to get volunteers for a study like that!

— Richard Lipton, Jo Estill Honorary Doctorate Oration, 2004

== Influence and impact ==
Estill has presented courses and workshops on her research and the Estill Voice Training system all over the world. For example, Estill has presented in London by invitation of The Voice Research Society and the British Voice Association, and on courses organised by Gillyanne Kayes. Estill is reported to have made a big impact on the theatre scene in the UK because she offered an alternative approach to the traditional way of singing training.

I think that we will only understand the full effect of Jo's training model ... when we are well into the next millennium.

— Gillyanne Kayes, Singing and the Actor, A & C Black 2000 page x

Many authors and performers have acknowledged Estill and Estill Voice Training in the development of their own work including: Gillyanne Kayes, Deirdre Trundle, Mary McDonald Klimek, Donna Soto-Morettini, Joan Lader, Lise Olson, Dane Chalfin and Klea Blackhurst.

Marni Nixon recalls 'fighting with this wonderful teacher, Jo Estill' when she began to explore belting and pedagogy.

== Discography ==
- On Wings Of Song (2009)

== Selected published works ==
- Estill, J; Colton, RH (June 1979). "The identification of some voice qualities". The Journal of the Acoustical Society of America. 65 (S1). New York: American Institute of Physics for the Acoustical Society of America: S115. Bibcode:1979ASAJ...65..115E. doi:10.1121/1.2016966. ISSN 0001-4966.
- Colton, RH; Estill, J (June 1979). "Perceptual aspects of some voice qualities". The Journal of the Acoustical Society of America. 65 (S1). New York: American Institute of Physics for the Acoustical Society of America: S115. Bibcode:1979ASAJ...65..115C. doi:10.1121/1.2016967. ISSN 0001-4966.
- Colton, Raymond H; Estill, Jo A (1981). "Elements of Voice Quality: Perceptual, Acoustic, and Physiologic Aspects". In Lass, Norman J (ed.). Speech and language: advances in basic research and practice. Vol. 5. New York: Academic Press. pp. 311–403. ISBN 0-12-608605-2. OCLC 604614015.
- Estill, Jo (March 1988). "Belting and Classic Voice Quality: Some Physiological Differences". Medical Problems of Performing Artists. 3 (1). Philadelphia: Hanley & Belfus: 37–43. ISSN 0885-1158. OCLC 12567861. Archived from the original on July 16, 2011.
- Yanagisawa, Eiji; Estill, Jo; Kmucha, Steven T; Leder, Steven B (1989). "The Contribution of Aryepiglottic Constriction to "Ringing" Voice Quality—A Videolaryngoscopic Study with Acoustic Analysis". Journal of Voice. 3 (4). New York: Raven Press: 342–350. doi:10.1016/S0892-1997(89)80057-8. ISSN 0892-1997. OCLC 52279265.
- Estill, Jo; Kobayashi, Noriko; Honda, Kiyoshi; Kakita, Yuki (1990). A Study on Respiratory and Glottal Controls in Six Western Singing Qualities: Airflow and Intensity Measurement of Professional Singing. First International Conference on Spoken Language Processing (ICSLP 90). Kobe, Japan. pp. 169–172. Archived from the original on July 25, 2011.
- Yanagisawa, Eiji; Kmucha, Steven T; Estill, Jo (January 1990). "Role of the Soft Palate in Laryngeal Functions and Selected Voice Qualities. Simultaneous velolaryngeal videoendoscopy". Annals of Otology, Rhinology, and Laryngology. 99 (1). St. Louis: Annals Publishing Company: 18–28. doi:10.1177/000348949009900104. ISSN 0003-4894. OCLC 1481398. PMID 2294830. S2CID 40641418.
- Kmucha, Steven T; Yanagisawa, Eiji; Estill, Jo (1990). "Endolaryngeal Changes During High-Intensity Phonation Videolaryngoscopic Observations". Journal of Voice. 4 (4). New York: Raven Press: 346–354. doi:10.1016/S0892-1997(05)80052-9. ISSN 0892-1997. OCLC 52279265.
- Yanagisawa, Eiji; Estill, Jo (January 1991). "Supraglottic Contributions to Pitch Raising: Videoendoscopic Study with Spectroanalysis". Annals of Otology, Rhinology, and Laryngology. 100 (1). St Louis: Annals Publishing Company: 19–30. doi:10.1177/000348949110000104. ISSN 0003-4894. OCLC 1481398. PMID 1985524. S2CID 39946360.
- Honda, Kiyoshi; Hirai, Hiroyuki; Estill, Jo; Tohkura, Yoh'ichi (1995). "Contribution of Vocal Tract Shape to Voice Quality: MRI Data and Articulatory Modeling". In Fujimura, Osamu; Hirano, Minoru (eds.). Vocal Fold Physiology: Voice Quality Control. Vocal Fold Physiology Series. San Diego: Singular Publishing Group. pp. 23–38. ISBN 1-56593-379-6. OCLC 30979398.
- Estill, Jo; Fujimura, Osamu; Sawada, Masashi; Beechler, Kerrie (1996). "Temporal Perturbation and Voice Qualities". In Davis, Pamela J; Fletcher, Neville H (eds.). Vocal Fold Physiology: Controlling Complexity and Chaos. Vocal Fold Physiology Series. San Diego: Singular Publishing Group. pp. 237–252. ISBN 1-56593-714-7. OCLC 34281786.
- Citardi, Martin J; Yanagisawa, Eiji; Estill, Jo (July 1996). "Videoendoscopic Analysis of Laryngeal Function During Laughter". Annals of Otology, Rhinology, and Laryngology. 105 (7). St. Louis: Annals Publishing Company: 545–549. doi:10.1177/000348949610500710. ISSN 0003-4894. OCLC 1481398. PMID 8678432. S2CID 8709728.
- Steinhauer, Kimberly M; Estill, Jo (April 2008). "The Estill Voice Model: Physiology of Emotion". In Izdebski, Krzysztof (ed.). Emotions in the Human Voice: Volume II Clinical Evidence. Emotions in the Human Voice Series. San Diego: Plural Publishing. ISBN 978-1-59756-118-1.
