= Estill Voice Training =

Program for developing vocal skills

- Abbreviation: EVT
- Formation: 1988; 38 years ago
- Founder: Jo Estill
- Headquarters: Pittsburgh, Pennsylvania
- President: Kimberly Steinhauer
- Parent organization: Estill Voice International, LLC
- Website: https://estillvoice.com

Estill Voice Training (often abbreviated EVT) is a program for developing vocal skills based on analysing the process of vocal production into control of specific structures in the vocal mechanism. By acquiring the ability to consciously move each structure the potential for controlled change of voice quality is increased.

The system was established in 1988 by American singing voice specialist Jo Estill, who had been researching in this field since 1979. Estill's research led to a series of vocal manoeuvres to develop specific control over individual muscle groups within the vocal mechanism. Estill said that the method can be used for any style of music. Speech and language therapists describe the exercises as valuable to voice therapy as well as singing, in both professional and non-professional voice use, offering an approach for therapeutic intervention.

== Vocal skills ==
=== Operating principles ===
==== Power, source and filter ====
Estill Voice Training partitions the vocal system into the three components power, source and filter extending the existing source–filter model of speech production. "Power" is the source of energy producing the sound (typically the respiratory system causing air to be expelled from the lungs). "Source" is the component that vibrates to create the sound waves (the vocal folds). "Filter" is the shaping of the sound waves to create the final result (the vocal tract). The focus of Estill Voice Training is on the source and filter components of the vocal system and the interactions between them.

==== Craft, artistry and performance magic ====
Estill Voice Training separates the use of voice into the "craft" of having control over the vocal mechanism, the "artistry" of expression relative to the material and context, and the "performance magic" of a speaker or singer connecting with their audience. Estill Voice Training has a focus on the "craft" aspect and hence has also been known as "Estill voice craft" by some practitioners.

==== Effort levels ====
Estill Voice Training uses the identification and quantification of the level of work or 'effort' required for speaking and singing to help develop kinesthetic feedback. This approach enables a speaker or singer to recognize, locate and control the degree of effort involved in voice production.

==== Dynamical systems theory and attractor states ====
The human vocal system is complex, involving interactions between breath flow, moving structures, resonators and so on. Estill Voice Training draws on a branch of applied mathematics known as dynamical systems theory that helps to describe complex systems. One key concept Estill Voice Training takes from dynamical systems theory is the notion that complex systems can have attractor states. Attractor states are states to which a complex system tends towards, or is attracted to, over time. When applied to the human vocal system, Estill Voice Training proposes there are configurations of the vocal system that are attractor states, which the speaker or singer uses habitually or tend towards. For example, a subject whose attractor state is for their velum (also known as the soft palate) to be in a raised position may find it requires more conscious effort to create a nasal sound than someone else whose attractor state is for their velum to be in the lowered position.

=== Figures for voice ===
In Estill Voice Training there are thirteen vocal exercises or "figures for voice" (named after the "compulsory figures" that figure skaters use to demonstrate proficiency). Each exercise or "figure" establishes control over a specific structure of the vocal mechanism, in isolation, by moving the structure through a number of positions. For example, the figure for velum (soft palate) control involves moving the velum through raised, partially lowered and lowered positions.

These figures for voice exercises have a focus basic anatomy and vocal physiology, a knowledge of which helps encourage deductions on reducing constriction and healthy voice decisions.

Figures for voice are taught on the course "Level One: Figures for Voice" that typically lasts three days. In addition to the thirteen Figures for Voice, Estill Voice Training also includes the "siren" exercise where a sound is produced across the entire vocal range. Other figures are historically part of the model including vocal fold mass which is now part of true vocal fold body-cover control, vocal fold plane which is now part of true vocal folds body-cover control and exercises for falsetto quality, and pharyngeal width which is now part of false vocal folds control and head and neck control.

True Vocal Folds, Onset/Offset Control
In this figure there are three options for coordinating expiration and vocal fold closure: glottal where the vocal folds are closed before expiration, smooth where vocal fold closure is synchronised with expiration, and aspirate where expiration precedes vocal fold closure. Learning to produce and apply different onsets marks the beginning of control over the vocal mechanism.
False Vocal Folds Control
Estill Voice Training identifies three possible positions of the false vocal folds: constricted, mid and retracted. This figure is helpful in identification of glottal and ventricular constriction. Its concepts and options are valuable to voice therapy as well as singing. The silent laugh technique, developed into an exercise by Jo Estill, is widely cited as reducing false vocal fold constriction.
True Vocal Folds, Body-Cover Control
The 'body-cover theory' of vocal fold structure was introduced by Hirano in 1977. This figure demonstrates the controlled use of the vocal folds in four body-cover configurations: on the thick edge, on the thin edge, in a stiff mode, or in a slack mode. These body-cover configurations change or modify the vibratory modes of the true vocal folds and, within the dynamical system of the human voice, effect the intensity of the sound produced and contribute to what are commonly labeled as the different human vocal registers. This figure was formerly known as vocal fold mass.
Thyroid Cartilage Control
This figure demonstrates control of the position or tilt of the thyroid cartilage through engagement or disengagement of the cricothyroid muscle. The speaker or singer can tilt the thyroid cartilage by adopting the posture of crying or sobbing, or making a soft whimpering noise, like a small dog whining. In Estill Voice training, it is proposed that the position of the thyroid cartilage influences not only pitch but also the quality and intensity of the sound produced.
Cricoid Cartilage Control
This figure demonstrates control of the position of the cricoid cartilage. In Estill Voice training it is proposed that specific positioning of the cricoid cartilage is a typical part of the vocal set-up for shouting and other high-intensity voice productions employing higher subglottic pressure.
Larynx Control
This figure trains raising and lowering of the larynx influencing resonance. This figure was formerly known as the larynx height figure.
Velum Control
This figure trains the velum (also known as the soft palate) and consists of exercises opening, partially closing and completely closing the velopharyngeal port to control the degree of nasality in the voice.
Tongue Control
This figure demonstrates the influences of different tongue postures, such as compressed. As a practical example, Diane Sheets (Estill Voice Training Certified Course Instructor) worked on the interaction of tongue and larynx when dealing with the vocal problems of Marty Roe, lead vocalist of Diamond Rio. Control of the tongue can have subtle resonance changes and give greater flexibility to the range.
Aryepiglottic Sphincter Control
This figure demonstrates the ability to control twang in the voice through conscious anteroposterior narrowing of the aryepiglottic sphincter in the upper epilarynx while avoiding constriction of the false vocal folds. Estill suggests that this laryngeal tube creates a separate resonator that is responsible for the extra brightness in phonation.
Jaw Control
The jaw figure demonstrates the subtle resonance changes in voice production that are associated with different positions or postures of the jaw.
Lips Control
This figure demonstrates various lip postures employed by speakers and singers and their subtle impact on vocal resonance through changing the length of the vocal tract.
Head and Neck Control
Head and neck anchoring involves bracing the skeletal structures of the head and neck gives a stable external framework for the smaller muscles that control the vocal tract.
Torso Control
Torso anchoring stabilises the body and breath.

=== Voice qualities ===
Estill Voice Training incorporates six 'voice qualities' as mechanisms for demonstration of voice production control. The increased control developed through proficiency in the different Figures for Voice allows the singer or speaker to manipulate the vocal mechanism specifically to produce these arbitrary voice qualities, and variations on them. Essentially these voice qualities, such as 'Sob Quality' and 'Belt Quality', are constructed from moving the structures of the vocal mechanism into specific positions or combinations. For example, Sob Quality includes a low larynx position (the larynx figure) and thin vocal folds (the true vocal fold body & cover figure).

Voice qualities are taught on the course 'Level Two: Figure Combinations for Six Voice Qualities' that typically lasts two days.

Speech
Speech quality is often termed modal speech by voice scientists or chest voice by singers. Speech quality includes thick vocal folds and a neutral/mid larynx position.
Falsetto
In Estill Voice Training terminology, the term falsetto has a meaning distinct from falsetto as a male vocal register in Western classical terminology. This quality is produced with stiff vocal fold body cover, neutral/mid larynx position, and aspirate vocal fold onset.
Sob
Sob quality is a soft and dark sound, associated with the sobbing cry of an adult who mourns. Sob quality is produced on a lowered larynx and thinned vocal folds. Sob quality releases glottal hyperadduction and medial compression, lowers the larynx and releases pharyngeal constriction. Mary Hammond says that young performers find low larynx and sob quality less familiar. Cry quality is a permutation of sob quality adopting a higher laryngeal position.
Twang
The key to twang quality is a narrowing of the epilarynx via a narrowing or constriction of the aryepiglottic sphincter. Twang quality has been used by speakers and singer to boost vocal resonance or 'squillo' and is referred to as the speaker's ring or singer's formant. The quality is helpful when teaching safe shouting and at cutting through background noise, increasing clarity of the voice, and is taught to both singers and actors to enable them to be heard clearly in large auditoria without vocal strain. Twang quality may be nasalized or oral, as differentiated by an open or closed velopharyngeal port. Estill suggests setting the vocal tract initially by imitating a cat yowling, ducks quacking, and other exercises.
Opera
Opera quality is a complex set-up including a mix of speech quality and twang quality with a tilted thyroid cartilage, lowered larynx.
Belting
Belting or belt quality is a complex setup combining speech quality, twang quality, a tilted cricoid cartilage and raised larynx. Twang is an important component in belt quality. Jo Estill has described it as "happy yelling".' Belt quality also uses clavicular breathing and has the longest closed phase with the highest subglottic pressure and the greatest glottic resistance.

=== Criticism ===
Estill Voice Training has been criticised for not including 'breathing' and the related abdominal support within the system, and some of the uses of anchoring for classical singing, although Shewell cites Jo Estill as suggesting breath work as unnecessary if the Figures for Voice are well practiced.

== Estill Voice International ==
Estill Voice Training is a trademark of Estill Voice International, LLC. The company provides certifications for vocalists and instructors.

=== Influence, adoption and application ===
Estill Voice International certifies voice professionals for Estill Voice Training globally. Estill Voice Training has been in use across a range of disciplines:

- Popular music: including pop singing and country singing.
- Acting and musical theatre training: as part of the training for students at drama schools and universities in the United Kingdom, the United States, and Australia.
- Clinical Voice Therapy: Dinah Harris, contributor to The Voice Clinic Handbook, recommends learning Estill Voice Training as it provides many useful tools for those working in a voice clinic. Rattenbury, Carding and Finn present a study that used a range of Figures for Voice exercises as prognostic indicators and voice therapy treatment techniques.
- Community Choirs
