= List of American public-access television programs =

This is a list of American public-access television programs.

== List ==
Series	Location (Home station)	Duration	No. of episodes	Host(s)	Ref.
The Atheist Experience	Austin, TX (ACTV)	1997–	908+	Matt Dillahunty; Russell Glasser; Don Baker; Jeff Dee; Tracie Harris; John Iacoletti; Jen Peeples; Martin Wagner	
Atomic TV	Baltimore, ML (Channel 75)	1997-	200+	Tom Warner; Scott Huffines	
The Average Guys TV Show	Duluth, MN (PACT-TV)	1998–2013	576	Kenny Kalligher; Jon Donahue	
The Basement Sublet of Horror	Lawrence, Kansas (LCAT)	2006–	230	Joel Sanderson	
Bob's Big Adventures	Providence, RI (PEG-RI)	1993–		Bob Venturini	
Boston Latino TV	Boston, MA (BNN)	2003–		Evelyn Reyes; Gil Matos; Clairemese Montero	
Cast Iron TV	Manhattan, NY (Channel D)	1979–1992			
Caught in the Act	Charlottesville, VA (CPA-TV)	1999–2004	100	David Dillehunt	
Chic-a-Go-Go	Chicago, IL (CAN-TV)	1996–	1,000+	Jake Austen; Mia Park	
The Chris Gethard Show	Manhattan, NY (MNN)	2011–2015 (Note: Following its departure from MNN in January 2015, The Chris Gethard Show moved to Fusion in May 2015, before moving on to truTV in July 2017.)	155	Chris Gethard	
Concrete TV	Manhattan, NY (MNN)	1994–			
Cool Clown Ground	Chicago, IL (CAN-TV)	1994–	469+	Shelley Mobil; Thymme Jones; Cheer-Accident	
Cool In Your Code	New York City, NY (NYC Media)	2004–		Christopher Kromer; R. Brandon Johnson; Shirley Rumierk	
Disco Step-by-Step	Buffalo, NY	1975–1980		Marty Angelo	
The Dr. Susan Block Show	Berkeley, CA (BTV-25)	1990–		Susan Block	
Fantasy Bedtime Hour	San Francisco, CA (Access SF)	2001–2009	40	Heatherly Stankey; Julie Breithaupt	
The Folklorist	Newton, MA (NewTV)	2012–	13	John Horrigan	
JBTV	Chicago, IL (Tuff TV)	1984–		Jerry Bryant; Greg Corner; Lauren O'Neill	
The Jerry Jer Show	Bridgeport, CT (WFAC-TV)	–1996		Jerry “Jerry Jer” McClellan	
Junktape	Manhattan, NY (MNN)	1998	7	Sean S. Baker; Spencer Chinoy; Dan Milano	
INN World Report	Tribeca, NY (Free Speech TV)	2004–		Mizan Kirby Nunes	
The Kid America Club	Manhattan, NY (MNN)	2002–			
Late Night with Shaver The Terrestrial	San Francisco, CA	2024–		Ryan Shaver	
Lavender Lounge	San Francisco, CA	1991–1995	60	Mark Kliem	
Let's Paint TV	Los Angeles, CA (Eagle Rock Public Access)	2002–2008	600+	John Kilduff	
Live from Midtown	Bronx, NY (Colours TV)	2007–2009		Hashim "Trends" Smith	
Live from the Artists Den	Garden City, NY (WLIW)	2009–			
The Lone Shark	Bridgeport, CT (WFAC-TV)	1991–2001		Jim Sharky; Sean Haffner	
Midnight Blue	Manhattan, NY (Channel J)	1975–2003		Al Goldstein	
The Mr. Science Show	Melbourne, FL	1993–1995		Tim Perkins	
New York Noise	New York City, NY (NYC Media)	2003–2009	89		
Pancake Mountain	Washington, D.C. (DCTV)	2003–2011; 2014–			
Quiz Kids	San Francisco, CA (PEN-TV)	1999		Brad Friedman	
Race and Reason	Various	1984–1997?		Tom Metzger	
Rox	Bloomington, IN (BCAT)	1992–	99	Joe Nickell; Bart Everson	
The Show with No Name	Austin, TX (ACTV)	1995–2005		Charlie Sotelo	
The Spud Goodman Show	Seattle, WA	1985–1992		Spud Goodman; Chick Hunter	
Squirt TV	Manhattan, NY	1994–1996		Jake Fogelnest	
Stairway to Stardom	Staten Island, NY	1979–1992		Frank Masi	
State of the State	Providence, RI (PEG-RI)	1992–		John Carlevale	
Static Television	New Orleans, LA (Cox 10)	2006–		Pami P	
Stateside Footy	North Andover, MA (NACAM)	2010–	96	Bill Robert	
Talkin' Funny	Chicago, IL (CAN-TV)	2005–	53	Steve Gadlin; Paul Luikart	
Tech Throwback	North Andover, MA (NACAM)	2015–	9	Bill Robert	
Thee Mr. Duran Show	La Verne, CA (LVTV)	2000–	93	Richard Duran	
The Trevor Moore Show	Charlottesville, VA (CPA-TV)	1996–1998	18	Trevor Moore	
Video Game Slams	San Francisco, CA (TCI 53)	1994–2003		Greg Fleming; Brian Raffi; Michael Baldwin; Mat McKnight; Emily Albertson; Richard Allard; Tricia Gray; Veronica Jet Sharp; Michael Jones; Matt Allard; Xavier Hagwood-Harris; Lisa Williams; Paige Fleming; Shawn Flannery	
The Writer's Block with John J. Ronan	Gloucester, MA (1623 Studios)	1990–	438+	John J. Ronan	
Your Daily Hour With Me	Olympia, WA (TCTV)	2010–	5000+	Rick Ward	
