= Jacqueline Stewart =

American professor and television host (born 1970)

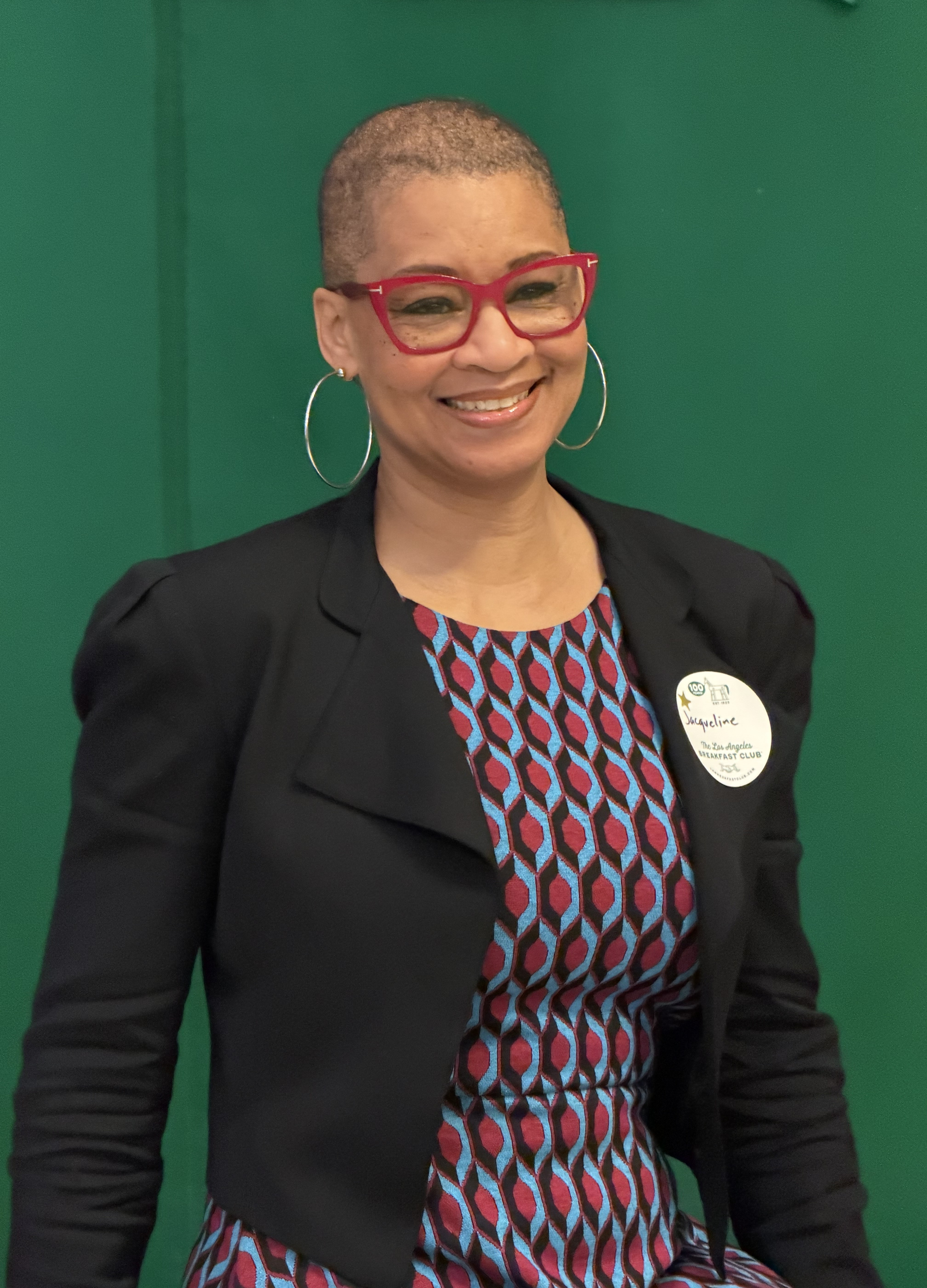
- Stewart in 2026
- Born: 1970 (age 55–56); Chicago, Illinois, U.S.
- Education: Stanford University (BA); University of Chicago (MA, PhD)
- Occupations: Film historian; film archivist; museum director; television host; university professor
- Years active: 1999–present
- Spouse: Jake Austen
- Children: 2

Jacqueline Najuma Stewart is an American cinema studies scholar and television host for Turner Classic Movies. A professor at the University of Chicago, she also served as the inaugural artistic director, and then president for the Academy Museum of Motion Pictures from 2021 to 2024. Stewart is an elected member of the American Academy of Arts and Sciences and National Film Preservation Board, and was honored as a MacArthur Fellow.

Born in Chicago, Stewart is an alumna of Stanford University, where she earned a Bachelor's degree in English, and of University of Chicago, where she obtained master's and PhD degrees, also in English. In 2005, she wrote her debut non-fiction book Migrating to the Movies, which explored the correlation of classical Hollywood cinema and the African-American experience during the Great Migration. Meanwhile, Stewart served as the chairwoman for the nonprofit arts organization, Black Cinema House, and founded the South Side Home Movie Project. She also collaborated with her husband Jake Austen on the public-access television series Chic-a-Go-Go.

In 2015, Stewart collaborated with Charles Musser on curating the DVD set Pioneers of African-American Cinema, which led to an appearance on Turner Classic Movies (TCM), alongside Ben Mankiewicz. She subsequently appeared at the TCM Classic Film Festival, and in 2019, Stewart was hired to host the Silent Sunday Nights programming block on late-night weekends.

== Early years and education ==
Jacqueline Stewart was born and raised in Hyde Park, within South Side, Chicago. During her childhood, she remembered her aunt Constance introducing her to classic films on television. She stated, "...I always stayed up really late with her watching black and white films. She would talk to me during the commercial breaks about all the stars and the theaters that she used to go to. I was fascinated by the alternative world that I saw, the way that people talked and the way they dressed."

Stewart graduated from Kenwood Academy High School. Afterwards, she enrolled in Stanford University, intent on becoming a journalist. There, she watched Spike Lee's She's Gotta Have It (1986). Impressed, she studied Lee's career and feminist film theory, on which she based her Bachelor of Arts thesis. In 1991, she graduated with a Bachelors in English. After this, Stewart enrolled as a graduate student at the University of Chicago (UC). Stewart reflected, "Film studies was just being formalized there and they hired a scholar named Miriam Hansen who wound up being my dissertation advisor and my mentor. And she specialized in silent cinema." In 1993, she graduated with a Master's degree, and in 1998 with a PhD, both in English from the University of Chicago.

== Career ==
=== University professor ===
Stewart taught at the University of Chicago from 1999 to 2006, serving in the Department of English and on the Committee on Cinema & Media Studies. In 2006, she joined the Department of Radio/Television/Film, and the Department of African American Studies, at Northwestern University as an associate professor. She returned to the University of Chicago in 2013 as a professor in the Department of Cinema and Media Studies. During the fall of 2020, she began an extended leave from the University of Chicago after she was selected as the first artistic director for the Academy Museum of Motion Pictures. She returned to the university in 2024 after also serving as the museum's president.

In 2018, Stewart was elected to the American Academy of Arts and Sciences, and in 2021, she was awarded a MacArthur Fellowship. In 2024, she was awarded the Distinguished Career Achievement Award by the Society for Cinema and Media Studies (SCMS).

=== Author ===
In 2005, Stewart published her first book titled Migrating to the Movies: Cinema and Black Urban Modernity. The Chicago Tribune reported she had spent a decade researching the topic, which focused on the role Hollywood cinema played in both influencing and reflecting the social mobility of Black Americans, particularly during the Great Migration when they began relocating to the Northeast after living in the South.

Ten years later, in 2015, she co-authored the book L.A. Rebellion: Creating a New Black Cinema, chronicling the film movement, with then-UCLA Film and Television Archive director Jan-Christopher Horak and then-UCLA cinema studies professor Allyson Nadia Field. In 2021, she published her third book William Greaves: Filmmaking as Mission, a biography of the documentary filmmaker, with Scott MacDonald, a professor at Hamilton College. For several years, Stewart has been researching for a biography on actor–director Spencer Williams.

=== Museum curator ===
In 2005, Stewart founded the South Side Home Movie Project, which collects, preserves, as a cultural and historical resource, the 16 mm, 8 mm, and Super 8 homemade films of residents of South Side, Chicago, together with oral histories of the creators. The archive is headquartered in Evanston, Illinois, but after Stewart left for Northwestern University, she continued to collaborate with the university's Film Studies Center, the Center for the Study of Race, Politics & Culture, and several Chicago graduate students to continue the project.

By 2020, she was a three-term appointee to the National Film Preservation Board (NFPB), which advises the Librarian of Congress on policy. She also chaired the NFPB Diversity Task Force, ensuring the selected films chosen for the National Film Registry reflect diversity and inclusion.

Taking a sabbatical from the University of Chicago, in 2021, Stewart was appointed the inaugural artistic director at the Academy Museum of Motion Pictures. On July 6, 2022, the Academy Museum announced Stewart's appointment as director and president of the institution. At the museum, she oversaw the opening of numerous exhibits, including its first permanent exhibit, and led the development of its first strategic plan. She stepped down in 2024 to return to the University of Chicago.

=== Television career ===
During her high school years, Stewart met Jake Austen, who would soon become her husband. During the 1990s, Austen began researching a WCIU-TV children's dance program titled Kiddie a-Go-Go, which was replaced by Soul Train, after he had been sent photographs for a story. He became interested in dance television, and together with Stewart, they decided to create a new children's program as a homage. They connected with Kelly Kuvo of The Scissor Girls, a Chicago-based music band. With Kuvo's help, CAN-TV offered Austen a time slot to broadcast his program. Chic-a-Go-Go premiered in May 1996, and has remained on the air ever since.

In 2015, Stewart collaborated with Charles Musser on curating the DVD set Pioneers of African-American Cinema. During the summer of 2017, Stewart was invited on Turner Classic Movies to present a selection of films from the set, with future colleague Ben Mankiewicz. Soon after, she was invited to the 2018 TCM Classic Film Festival as a panelist to discuss the history of black images; in 2019, she was a guest speaker at a screening of The Defiant Ones (1958) and was a panelist for a discussion titled "The Complicated Legacy of Gone with the Wind".

In September 2019, Stewart became the first African-American host for Turner Classic Movies, as the host for the Silent Sunday Nights programming block. In 2020, she stated her first exposure to silent films had been at the Museum of Science and Industry in Chicago, watching them with her friends during weekends.

In June 2020, following the murder of George Floyd, writer–director John Ridley wrote an op-ed calling for the 1939 film Gone with the Wind to be pulled from HBO Max. The film was temporarily pulled and placed back on the service later that month, with a new commentary introduction from Stewart. In an op-ed for CNN, Stewart wrote: "Some complained that taking the film down was a form of censorship. For others, seeing Gone with the Wind featured so prominently in HBO Max's launch felt like salt rubbed into wounds that have never been permitted to heal ... But it is precisely because of the ongoing, painful patterns of racial injustice and disregard for black lives that Gone with the Wind should stay in circulation and remain available for viewing, analysis and discussion."

In 2021, TCM debuted a new series titled Reframed Classics, reanalyzing 18 films with problematic racial and gender stereotypes, with Stewart as one of the hosts. Charles Tabesh, TCM's senior vice president of programming, told the Los Angeles Times the response to the Reframed Classics series was mixed among older audiences. On the other hand, Stewart stated it was well-received by Academy members, especially those who are people of color. She said: "They appreciate the channel and the ways it is recognizing issues like blackface in classic films, or the casting of white actors to play nonwhite characters, in greater depth."

== Personal life ==
Stewart is married to Jake Austen, a rock artist and editor of the Roctober music zine. They met during high school. She has two children. In 1996, Austen and Stewart co-created a children's dance television program Chic-a-Go-Go.

== Books ==
- Migrating to the Movies: Cinema and Black Urban Modernity. University of California Press. 2005. ISBN 978-0-520-23349-2.
- Field, Allison; Horak, Jan-Christopher; Stewart, Jacqueline, eds. (2015). L.A. Rebellion: Creating a New Black Cinema. University of California Press. ISBN 978-0-520-28468-5.
- MacDonald, Scott; Stewart, Jacqueline, eds. (2021). William Greaves: Filmmaking as Mission. Columbia University Press. ISBN 978-0-231-55319-3.
