= Jumpsuit (disambiguation) =

A jumpsuit is a form-fitting garment which covers the whole body.

Jumpsuit may also refer to:

- Jumpsuit (band), an American rock band
- "Jumpsuit" (song), a song by American rock band Twenty One Pilots' fifth album, Trench
- The paratrooper uniform worn by the United States Army in World War II

== See also ==
- Parachuting
