= List of Tim and Eric Awesome Show, Great Job! episodes =

The following is a list of Tim and Eric Awesome Show, Great Job! episodes. Episodes in the first three seasons were all released two days earlier than their air dates on Adult Swim Video.

== Series overview ==
Season	Episodes	Originally released	
Season	Episodes	First released	Last released
1	10	February 11, 2007	April 15, 2007
2	10	November 18, 2007	January 27, 2008
3	10	July 27, 2008	September 28, 2008
4	10	February 9, 2009	April 12, 2009
5	10	February 28, 2010	May 2, 2010
Specials	2	December 5, 2010	August 27, 2017

== Episodes ==
=== Season 1 (2007) ===
No. overall	No. in season	Title	Original release date	Prod. code
1	1	"Dads"	February 11, 2007	101
Tim and Eric start their new show but Tim feels jealous after he receives a gift basket from his dad dedicated to Eric; Chippy interrupts the opening credits of Ein Liebespaar (How to Make Love Without Touching); C-Boy (Tim) and Leif (Eric) face off in a Hacky Sack Extreme game; Dr. Steve Brule reports on fruits and vegetables as well as fire safety but he’s not ready; Casey and his Brother perform Time Travel; Tim and Eric perform the Old Waiting Room Sketch at 3 a.m.; Cinco Toys advertises the B'owl, a doll resembling a cross between a bat and owl; Tim prank calls a pest control company. Guest appearances: Bob Odenkirk as Cinco Spokesman, John C. Reilly as Dr. Steve Brule and Fred Tatasciore (Uncredited) as Hacky Sack Extreme Announcer
2	2	"Friends"	February 18, 2007	102
Eric sends Tim an ornamental hot dog after finding out he is dying of "Limp Lip"; Cinco Balls Insurance will give you 300 dollars everytime you hit your balls accidentally; The show's introduction takes too long to start as Tim and Eric smile and stare to the camera; Pierre sings Doo Dah Doo Doo: Dance Instruction Tape For Children; The celebration for Dr. Steve Brule's 10th year in broadcasting goes horribly wrong after Wayne and Jan Skylar prank him; Chippy presents the benefits of Whore's Milk and hides near a herd of bison; Meatballs fall to the floor; Tim and Eric pitch a jingle for Rolo; Dr. Steve Brule advises about raking leaves. Guest appearances: Brian Posehn as Gibbons, John C. Reilly as Dr. Steve Brule and Bob Odenkirk as Channel 5 Announcer (Uncredited)
3	3	"Cats"	February 25, 2007	103
Tim learns a magic trick that turns him into a cat but he can't turn back into a human again; Channel 5 presents their brand new series, Kitty Cat Man, about a man that can turn himself into a cat; The Gravy Robbers Restaurant presents a new way to enjoy food and gravy while Tairy Greene teaches potential employees the best gravy robbing techniques; Channel 5 Kid Break presents I Sit Down When I Pee; Tim creates bad free portraits in the street. Guest appearances: Michael Cera as Jamie Stevens, Zach Galifianakis as Tairy Greene, Bob Odenkirk as an announcer and Paul Reubens as The Moon
4	4	"Salame" "Sitcom"	March 4, 2007	104
After Tim misses work Eric rebrands the show as Eric Wareheim's Awesome Show; David Liebe Hart sings about extraterrestrial life and teaches the word "Salame"; Tim and Eric hold a seminar on how to begin a successful career in writing sitcoms; Steve Mahanahan advertises his Child-Clown Outlet while his brother Mike advertises his Child Clown Shoes Outlet; Simon escorts a group of old women into a church in Here She Comes; Tim gets a haircut similar to Tom; The Canadian Flag has multiple uses as decoration; Casey and his Brother perform Cops and Robbers. (Note: This episode is titled "Sitcom" on the Season 1 DVD, but is also known as "Salame"). Guest appearances: Bob Odenkirk as Here She Comes singer and "Weird Al" Yankovic as Simon
5	5	"Chunky"	March 11, 2007	105
Carol has a secret crush on her boss Mr. Henderson but he acts in mean and disrespectful ways towards her; Tim and Eric perform Sports; Cinco Toys advertises the T'ird, a flying wheel resembling a cross between a bird and a turtle; Danny Mothers interviews Glen Tennis about his new film Crystal Shyps on Channel 5's Lookin' At Film; Vernon the ventriloquist (Tim) performs a strange routine with his puppet Horsey (Eric); Eric pulls a spiderweb-themed prank on Tim. Guest appearances: A. D. Miles as Glen Tennis and Bob Odenkirk as Cinco Spokesman and Danny Mothers
6	6	"Slop"	March 18, 2007	106
Tragg teaches how to make some of his famous slop on his cooking show Tragg's Trough; Tim and Eric show what success is; Tim and Eric’s replacements host the show; The Beaver Boys attempt to pick up some ladies at the beach, go clubbing and enjoy shrimp and white wine; David Liebe Hart sings about education and staying in school; Channel 5 Kid Break presents I Wear My Dad's Dirty Socks; The entrepreneur Ken Tulley (Tim) advertises a workout program called Fitness Can Be E-Z. Guest appearances: Bob Odenkirk as announcer, Fred Willard as Tragg and Ron Lynch as Man in Fitness Commercial
7	7	"Abstinence"	March 25, 2007	107
Jan and Wayne Skylar cover the No Sex Week and the No Sex Hot Dog Parade arranged by Channel 5; A Pizza Boy sings about love in times of abstinence; Paul Willeaux, the spokesman for Lazy Horse Mattress and Bedding Supply, has disturbing nightmares; Tim and Eric replace their entire staff with elderly men as a cost-savings measure; Tim and Eric try beatboxing; Maria Bamford, host of The New You!, has mommy issues to solve; Eric tries to use the Cinco Personal Banking Center. Guest appearances: Maria Bamford as herself, David Cross as Pizza Boy, Will Forte as Paul Willeaux, Abbey Brooks (credited as Holly Browning) as Lickety Splits and John C. Reilly as Dr. Steve Brule (uncredited)
8	8	"Hamburger"	April 1, 2007	108
Tim and Eric are forced to use Neil Hamburger Taxi to deliver their next episode to the network in time to air; Dr. Steve Brule's reports on digestive problems and milk expiration dates; The Uncle Muscle's Grand Championship has special performances by Casey and his Brother and Michael Q. Schmidt; Tim prank calls a music store about his "uke’"; Tim and Eric have a Dance-Off contest; Chippy hides in a skill crane. Guest appearances: Gregg Turkington as Neil Hamburger, Bob Odenkirk as Channel 5 announcer, John C. Reilly as Dr. Steve Brule, "Weird Al" Yankovic as Uncle Muscles and Michael Q. Schmidt as himself
9	9	"Anniversary"	April 8, 2007	109
Tim and Eric Awesome Show, Great Job! celebrates its 50th anniversary hosted by Pat Dudley but Tim and Eric haven't spoken to each other since an unfortunate stairway incident; Pierre teaches children how to meditate in a brand new instructional video; E-Z Kreme diarrhea inducer helps you to miss important events; Richard Dunn makes some improvisation exercises on Dunn-Prov; The Cinco MIDI Organizer Filing System helps you to organize your MIDI files by date, kind, size and name; Grum performs Crackers and Snacks. Guest appearances: Tom Kenny as Pat Dudley (Uncredited) and Bob Odenkirk as E-Z Kreme Spokesman (Uncredited)
10	10	"Missing"	April 15, 2007	110
The Uncle Muscles Hour is turned upside down when Casey Tatum turns up missing as his brother desperately searches for him; Eric talks about his collection of rascals in Nights with Tim Heidecker; Dr. Steve Brule reports on modern fashion with Jan Skylar as his assistant making Wayne jealous; Cinco advertises the B'ougar, a cross between a bear and a cougar (representing the scariest-looking and scariest-sounding animals in nature). Guest appearances: Bob Odenkirk as Channel 5 announcer and Cinco Spokesman, John C. Reilly as Dr. Steve Brule and "Weird Al" Yankovic as Uncle Muscles

=== Season 2 (2007–08) ===
No. overall	No. in season	Title	Original release date	Prod. code
11	1	"Vacation"	November 18, 2007	201
Eric returns from vacation with a video created by his new best friend Raz, prompting Tim to do the same for one with his new best friend Tony; The cruel fate of Casey Tatum is revealed and Uncle Muscles shares a classic performance in Casey's memory: Hamburgers and Hot-Dogs; James Quall does a Michael Jackson impression, Bradley Michael Fahrtz advertises the Poop Tube, a new experience for the bathroom; Magician Gregory hosts Trick My Trick; Cinco advertises The Best of James Quall VHS Collection. Guest appearances: Bob Odenkirk as Gregory, Debbie Merrill as Gwyneth, "Weird Al" Yankovic as Uncle Muscles, Mark Holton as Bradley Michael Fahrtz and Samuel Proof as Raz
12	2	"Dad's Off"	November 25, 2007	202
Drama ensues when Eric has to compete for his children's respect, against the coolness of the Heidecker family; Channel 5 Kid Break presents I Think My Sister's Cute; The newest Cinco product, Thocks, combines the thong and the sock into one piece of clothing that will spice up your wardrobe; Spagett attempts to spook and surprise people on his hidden camera show; Chippy hides in a Thanksgiving dinner; David Liebe Hart sings about falling in love with one puppet. Guest appearances: Bob Odenkirk as Cinco Spokesman
13	3	"Dolls"	December 2, 2007	204
Tim and Eric produce a line of dolls but there is something wrong with Tim's doll; The show See My Goatee turns beards and stubble into goatees; Steve Brule introduces you to his new technique of self-defense: Last Resort Fighting, Palmer Scott sings a song about sitting on you, Tiny Hats advertises their line of miniature hats for small men, babies, and dolls; The Beaver Boys are rushed to the emergency room when the level of shrimp in their systems becomes dangerously high; Tim and Eric get excited when their mother arrives. Guest appearances: John C. Reilly as Dr. Steve Brule and Patton Oswalt as Beaver Boys Doctor
14	4	"Coma"	December 9, 2007	205
Eric can't wait to attend Tim's birthday party, so he overdoses on a powerful drug called WaitMate that puts him in a coma; Cinco Toys advertises My New Pep-Pep, a new life-like grandfather doll; Song Legends Karaoke presents Come Over by Ruth Carr; James Quall performs Beach Blast; Ron Stark interviews himself in his brand new show Stark on Stark. Guest appearances: Jeff Goldblum as himself
15	5	"Forest"	December 16, 2007	203
While Tim is taking nature photos he is attacked by Chippy's mother, but a mysterious man known as The Snuggler (performed by Tairy Greene) rescues him; Dr. Steve Brule gives a report on his favorite video game but forgets the title of it; Casey and his Brother perform Horsey and Buggy Ride on Uncle Muscles Classics; Video Match: A Dating Service presents a fax machine expert with petite feet; Tim and Eric sing about a man with petite feet and a feminine step. Guest appearances: Zach Galifianakis as Tairy Greene, Bob Odenkirk as Channel 5 announcer, John C. Reilly as Dr. Steve Brule and "Weird Al" Yankovic as Uncle Muscles
16	6	"Carol"	December 23, 2007	206
Carol's boss taunts her with a sex tape; Dr. Steve Brule advises about smelly armpits; Cinco Sweets advertises their new edible toy product Candy Tails, including a tie-in cartoon; Glen Tennis sells Crystal Shyps merchandise on Channel 5's Shopping Indoors; David Liebe Hart performs a song about fatherhood called Father and Son; Eric pranks Tim waking him up with shaving cream. Guest appearances: Maria Bamford as Candy Tails Spokeswoman, A. D. Miles as Glen Tennis, John C. Reilly as Dr. Steve Brule, Aimee Mann and Bob Odenkirk as Channel 5 announcer (Uncredited)
17	7	"Robin"	January 6, 2008	207
Eric gives Tim his own Robin Williams as a gift, but it soon becomes uncontrollable and runs away right before their two man improv show; Dress to Impress 2.0 designs a man's weekend wear; The Cinco Library advertises their new Encyclopedia of Numbers; Richard Dunn hosts his own talk show Dunngeon with special guests Dave Navarro and Zwei Dunkel Jungen (Tim and Eric); Tim and Eric hold auditions for a fake film called Demons; Guest appearances: Will Forte as Paul Willeaux (Footage Cameo), Dave Navarro as himself, Rainn Wilson as Cinco Spokesman and Stephanie Courtney as Demons' Casting Director
18	8	"Innernette"	January 13, 2008	208
Tim and Eric promote the Innernette, a mini CD from Cinco with software simulating the internet; Channel 5 airs a promo for an encore presentation of The Jeff GoldBluMan Group; Casey and His Brother perform A Song for Mommy; A new method of making art using your house cat, called Pussy Doodles, is advertised, but behind the scenes the commercial falls apart; Dr. Steve Brule advises on making single life less awful; David Liebe Hart talks about computer ethics; Pierre hosts the Channel 5 Dance Party with some special guests like Palmer Scott, Ben Hur and Casey's Mom. Guest appearances: David Cross as Pussy Doodles Spokesman, Jeff Goldblum as himself, Bob Odenkirk as Pussy Doodles Director and John C. Reilly as Dr. Steve Brule
19	9	"Pepperoni"	January 20, 2008	209
In the documentary Breadheads by T. Howard, two middle-aged mothers (Tim and Eric) are obsessed with a children's singer called Bread Harrity; The Mayor and Roy have a violent disagreement; Channel 5 Kid Break has a special Teen Edition with the song Never Gonna Wipe my Butt; K.J Nutt hosts the show Hobby Holes; Dr. Steve Brule advises about protein on ants; Video Match: A Dating Service presents a RPG gamer; Tim and Eric write and pitch a jingle for Tom Skerritt; The Shins perform their own version of the Channel 5 Kid Break. Guest appearances: Fred Armisen as K.J. Nutt, Rainn Wilson as The Gamer, Tom Skerritt as himself, John C. Reilly as Dr. Steve Brule, Harout Pamboukjian as Bread Harrity and The Shins (Uncredited)
20	10	"Embarrassed"	January 27, 2008	210
Eric shares a naked baby picture of Tim with the audience. Angry and humiliated, Tim later confronts Eric in the parking lot, which leads to a violent confrontation and, ultimately, Tim's death; Cinco introduces its digital umpire, the D'ump; Tim and Eric perform a music bit about Pumpers and follow-up with a song, Tumblers are better than pumpers; Dr. Steve Brule reports from a vineyard and becomes extremely intoxicated in the process. Guest appearance: Bob Odenkirk as Channel 5 announcer and Cinco Spokesman and John C. Reilly as Dr. Steve Brule

=== Season 3 (2008) ===
No. overall	No. in season	Title	Original release date	Prod. code
21	1	"Resurrection"	July 27, 2008	301
Tim resurrects from the grave and acquires the ability to generate porcelain tiger statues out of thin air, so he and Eric start a new business using this new power; A strange laughing man welcomes us to the third season; Dick Dousche advertises his brand new Penile Cleansing Rag; Dr. Steve Brule appears as a guest in an infomercial for the Griddleman panini press; A bongo player, a krump dancer and a screaming mime perform in Afternoon Review. Guest appearance: John C. Reilly as Dr. Steve Brule and Cathy Mitchell as herself
22	2	"Chan"	August 3, 2008	302
Channel 5 celebrates 100 years of Jackie Chan; Tim has an affair with Eric's wife; Cinco advertises a new board game called It's Not Jackie Chan; Tim and Eric discuss about their zits in a brand new Channel 5 talk show; Will Grello reveals his frustrations against his father on his show Quilting With Will; Steve Mahanahan presents a child clown training video. Guest appearances: Will Forte as Will Grello, Bob Odenkirk as Channel 5 announcer and Abbey Brooks as Eric's wife (Credited as Holly Browning)
23	3	"Rascals"	August 10, 2008	303
Bob Odenkirk tries to fix Tim and Eric's relationship after Tim kills Eric's rascal; Little Joshua Beard sings about his favorite drink in Channel 5's Child Showcase; Two dancers (Tim and Eric) teach new jazz dance moves; Ed Begley Jr. introduces the Cinco-Phone, a revolutionary one-button one-call cellphone; Tairy Greene teaches about acting to children. Guest appearances: Bob Odenkirk as himself, Patton Oswalt as Joshua Beard, Ed Begley, Jr. as himself and Zach Galifianakis as Tairy Greene
24	4	"Spagett"	August 17, 2008	304
Spagett goes Hollywood with the help of Steven Spielberg in a very Indiana Jones-like film, but Eric feels jealous and hurt after not being considered to be in the movie; Dr. Steve Brule advises about Prom; Cinco Dairy advertises My Eggs, a powerful pill that helps you to incubate eggs in your own stomach; Video Match: A Dating Service presents a senior that doesn't have a bathroom in his house; With the help of a music video, a teacher talks about Biology for Foreign Men; Chippy hides in a farm. Guest appearances: Bob Odenkirk as Channel 5 announcer, John C. Reilly as Dr. Steve Brule, Steve Schirripa as Cinco Spokesman and Brian Posehn as himself
25	5	"C.O.R.B.S." "Recumbent"	August 24, 2008	305
The C.O.R.B.S. (Cops on Recumbent Bikes) attempt to stop a group of Colombian terrorists trying to take over a sugar factory, which ends in a terrible tragedy; Tim and Eric have fun with balloons; Grill Vogel teaches how to hug appropriately in a workplace, Rudy and Kent advertise the Cinco Eye Tanning System; Dr. Steve Brule tries to create a viral video; A family deals with divorce. Guest appearances: Ray Wise as Grill Vogel and John C. Reilly as Dr. Steve Brule
26	6	"Jim and Derrick"	August 31, 2008	306
The show is hijacked by The Jim and Derrick Show, a parody of "garbage" shows on channels such as MTV. Guest appearances: Abbey Brooks as Holly (Credited as Holly Browning), Elisha Cuthbert as herself, John Mayer as Tony's Friend, Gregg Turkington as Egg-Zackly Guy (Uncredited)
27	7	"Jazz"	September 7, 2008	307
Tim and Eric lead their jazz band through jazz chatter scats in a Channel 5 Jazz Session; James Quall makes an impression of Ronald Reagan; Maria Bamford has issues to address with his ex-boyfriend in her show Cleaning Up After Your Cat; Chippy befriends a Child Clown; The Beaver Boys go into a double date with twins; The movie Quall: The James Quall Story premieres a brand new trailer; Two businessmen try to get along at a dinner; Guest appearances: Maria Bamford as herself, Steve Pemberton as drummer and Bill Hader as James Quall
28	8	"Muscles For Bones"	September 14, 2008	308
Channel 5 broadcasts a Muscles for Bones charity benefit event supporting Richard Dunn with special performances by David Liebe Hart, Dr. Steve Brule, Casey and his Brother and Jan and Wayne Skylar. Guest appearances: "Weird Al" Yankovic as Uncle Muscles, John C. Reilly as Dr. Steve Brule, Will Forte as Dr. Reid Tamaranda and Michael Q. Schmidt as himself
29	9	"Larry"	September 21, 2008	309
Mr. Henderson and Carol have a date, much to the chagrin of her colleague Larry; Tim and Eric discuss about their burps in a brand new Channel 5 talk show; Tairy Greene's acting class continues; Little Bobby Stoan sings about birds and bees in Channel 5's Child Showcase. Guest appearances: Zach Galifianakis as Tairy Greene, Rainn Wilson as Bobby Stoan and The Bird and the Bee
30	10	"Brownies"	September 28, 2008	310
Tim and Eric binge on homemade brownies; Song Legends Karaoke presents I Can Wait by Lindsey Porch; Grill Vogel teaches more appropriate hugs; Richard Dunn hosts Shot Dunn; Cinco advertises the Cinco Facts Machine; Dr. Steve Brule advises on stomach doubling. Guest appearances: Ray Wise as Grill Vogel, Bob Odenkirk as Cinco Spokesperson, John C. Reilly as Dr. Steve Brule and Black Francis

=== Season 4 (2009) ===
Sometimes referred to as "Season Quad".

No. overall	No. in season	Title	Original release date	Prod. code
31	1	"Snow"	February 9, 2009	401
When a blizzard snows in Tim and Eric, they reminisce over hot chocolate, their first video together, e-mails and urine with David Liebe Hart and Richard Dunn; Diah Riha-Jones advertises the D-Pants, protective pants created to contain diarrhea; Tairy Greene's Acting Seminar for Children continues; Cinco advertises its sleeping aid, The Napple. Guest appearances: Alan Thicke as Dr. Alan Thicke and Zach Galifianakis as Tairy Greene
32	2	"Balls"	February 16, 2009	402
Eric has a third testicle implanted in his body for "more pizazz", but it eventually becomes a problem; Pick the Nipple; The Cinco Urinal Shower is introduced, but the commercial eventually goes out of control; Whoopsie Goldberg has a camera following her around to document embarrassing moments her life in the show Whoopisie Daisy; Frank Stallone sings a song for his daughter. Guest appearance: Frank Stallone as himself
33	3	"Universe"	February 23, 2009	403
A game show featuring celebrity lookalikes named Celebrity Zillions; Dr. Jimes Tooper and Dr. H. Donna Gust discuss the mysteries of the universe; Pierre presents a musical PSA declaring that "all the food is poison"; Gettin' it Dunn with David Lieber Mintz; Brule's Rules on ice cubes; Afternoon Review; a commercial for Tim'$ Discount Price$ is hijacked by another commercial for Eric's Premium Prices.
34	4	"Road Trip"	March 2, 2009	404
Tim and Eric visit Eric's parents in Florida; Channel 5 promotes its upcoming film Back to Squall, starring Jonah Hill, James Quall, and David Liebe Hart; Cinco Boy Synthetic Son; Brule's Rules on cavemen. Guest appearances: Peter Stormare
35	5	"Tommy"	March 9, 2009	405
Tommy Wiseau is hired to film a sketch, The Pig Man; "The Things I Like"; Cinco introduces its Mancierge service. Guest appearances: Fred Willard, Tommy Wiseau, and Sydnee Steele
36	6	"Origins"	March 16, 2009	406
The story of how Tim and Eric met; Brule's Rules on eggs; "Make My Bub-Bubs Bounce"; Channel 5 Science Week; Daymare; Cinco Mouth Decorator.
37	7	"Presidents"	March 23, 2009	407
Tim and Eric both announce their intent to run for president; The Ben Hur Show, Awesome; Channel 5 Kid Break ("Bloody Nips"); The Human Body with Dr. Steve Brule; Focus on Comedy with Michael Ian Black; The Best of Pusswhip Banggang.
38	8	"Hair"	March 30, 2009	408
Tim graduates from barber school; Song Legends Karaoke ("Live with My Dad"); Cinco C-Bund; J.J. Pepper's Videography; Josh Groban presents his Casey Tatum tribute album, Groban Sings Casey. Guest appearances: Josh Groban, Scott Thompson, Larry Miller and David Wain
39	9	"Brothers Cinco"	April 6, 2009	409
Terry of the Brothers Cinco is accused of murdering his wife.
40	10	"Tennis"	April 13, 2009	410
Tim and Eric play tennis; Glen Tennis interviews Grum about their new film, The Pilgrums; Spaghett advertises Cinco Cigarette Juice. Guest appearances: Fred Armisen, A.D. Miles, Flight of the Conchords, The Lonely Island and Bob Odenkirk

=== Season 5 (2010) ===
Often referred to as "Season Cinco". This was also the first and only season of the series to be produced 16:9 high definition.

No. overall	No. in season	Title	Original release date	Prod. code
41	1	"Comedy"	February 28, 2010	501
Tim and Eric change the format of their show into one reminiscent of Saturday Night Live; Cinco Diarrheaphram; Morning Meditations; Channel 5 promotes James Quall and David Liebe Hart's new cop drama, Quall of Duty: San Diego Streets. Guest appearances: Corbin Bernsen, Jack McBrayer, and Danny Trejo
42	2	"Puberty"	March 7, 2010	502
Eric reaches puberty before Tim, prompting him to try and find a way to induce it himself; Cinco i-Jammer and e-Bumper; Fortin' with Will; David Liebe Hart sings a song about puberty Guest appearance: Will Forte
43	3	"Reanimated"	March 14, 2010	503
After his remains are recovered, Casey Tatum is brought back to life; No. 1 Co-Worker; Patrick Duffy promotes Man Nip; Dr. Steve Brule considers whether kissing or buying a jetpack is more romantic. Guest appearances: Wendell Pierce, "Weird Al" Yankovic
44	4	"Choices"	March 21, 2010	504
Tim writes an autobiographical novel, Choices: The Problem with Eric Wareheim; Cinco H'amb; All Dolled Up. Guest appearances: William Sanderson and Karen Black
45	5	"Crows"	March 28, 2010	505
Tim's eyes are pecked out by crows. Flamboyant pop group The Paynus Brothers start a spanking craze. Cinco advertises the Sleepwatching Chair. Guest appearances: John Ennis, Michael Gross, Marilyn Manson, Bob Odenkirk, Jerry Penacoli, and Rainn Wilson guest star
46	6	"Lucky"	April 4, 2010	506
Tim thinks that his Cinco Musky Tusk Necklace is a more effective luck charm than Eric's rabbit's foot; Cinco Bro-oche; Pierre uses "Dream Cream" to see his ideal dream. Guest appearances: Bob Odenkirk, Trisha Paytas
47	7	"Stuntmen"	April 11, 2010	507
After being sent to prison for touching a clown, Steve Mahanahan's father Donald Mahanahan (Will Ferrell) promotes his "original" Child Clown Outlet; the Stontmehn Brothers appear on the talk show Feminine Perspectives to perform a pumpkin smashing stunt.
48	8	"Handsome"	April 18, 2010	508
Tim and Eric compete against each other to determine who is the "number one handsome man"; the Cinco Face-Time Party Snoozer is introduced. Guest appearances: Daphne Rosen and Elizabeth Starr
49	9	"Greene Machine"	April 25, 2010	509
An infomercial for the eponymous "Tairy Greene Machine", which features every work Tairy Greene has ever appeared in or is vaguely associated with, such as Little Dancing Man, and Little Danson Man (a film wherein Ted Danson is shrunk to only a few inches tall). Guest appearances: Zach Galifianakis, LeVar Burton, Peter Cetera, David Cross, Ted Danson, and Richard Marx
50	10	"Man Milk"	May 2, 2010	510
Half-hour series finale. After they begin to lactate, Tim and Eric decide to bottle and gift their "man milk" for the holidays; David Liebe Hart sings about STDs; Ben Stiller and Ben Hur form a comedy duo; Cinco Privacy Helmet; Sal and Al's Italian Massage; Be Provocative, Be Organized: A Two-Step Guide; Paul Rudd entertains himself with the Cinco Identity Generator 2.5; Richard Dunn, Hairvoyant Guest appearances: Fred Armisen, Paul Rudd, and Ben Stiller

=== Specials ===
Title	Original release date
"Chrimbus Special"	December 5, 2010
The story of Tim and Eric's Chrimbus, a holiday strongly paralleling Christmas, is told to a little girl in the distant future by her grandfather who reveals himself to be a mythical creature known as Dee Vee. Promotions for the DVD release are shown multiple times throughout the special.
"Awesome 10 Year Anniversary Version, Great Job?"	August 28, 2017
Tim and Eric try to invite others to attend their respective martial arts exhibitions; David Liebe Hart sings about growing one's own food; Cinco Fla'Hat; Casey and His Brother; "Spaghetti Again"; Steve Mahanahan reveals that he had escaped prison to continue his child clown rental business on international waters; Spooked by Spaghett.
