= The Catastrophe (film) =

2011 American short film

- Directed by: Michael Glover Smith
- Written by: Michael Glover Smith
- Produced by: Michael Glover Smith; Clayton Monical
- Starring: Peyton Myrick; Hector Reyes; Marla Seidell; George Christopher Tronsrue; Suzy Brack; Mia Park; Duane Sharp; Marshall Bean; Ed Schultz; D.J. Collins; Mouzam Makkar
- Cinematography: Justin Cameron
- Edited by: Ryan Taylor
- Music by: Shane Kliebenstein
- Release date: November 19, 2011 (Illinois International Film Festival)
- Running time: 15 minutes
- Country: United States
- Language: English

The Catastrophe is a 2011 short film directed by Chicago-based independent filmmaker and film studies instructor Michael Glover Smith, loosely based on the short story Mr. Higginbotham's Catastrophe by Nathaniel Hawthorne. The film had its world premiere at the Illinois International Film Festival on Saturday, November 19, 2011, where it won the award for Best Dramatic Short.

== Plot ==
The Catastrophe is a surreal drama/mystery short film that uses dreamlike imagery, a Bob Dylan song and a poem by Forough Farrokhzad to paint a portrait of Dominicus Pike, the quintessential modern man. The movie follows Dominicus as he traverses the American midwest, plying his trade as a cigar salesman, and his dawning realization that he may have sold his soul to a multinational corporation.

The main story of The Catastrophe is interwoven with narrative threads involving the collapse of Dominicus’ relationship with his girlfriend, Carlie, and his discovery of what may be a murder plot involving one of his clients, Mohammad “Double Apple” Akbari. Only life on the road alone makes it hard for Dominicus to distinguish where reality ends and dreams begin.

== History ==
The Catastrophe was shot on high definition digital video in four days in the late summer of 2011. Shooting locations included Chicago, Villa Park and Des Plaines, Illinois. Aside from lead actor Peyton Myrick, a North Carolina–based theatrical actor, most of the rest of the cast are well known in the worlds of Chicago music, theater, television and independent film; the cast includes noted thespians Mia Park (host of television's Chic-a-Go-Go), Marla Seidell, Suzy Brack, and Duane Sharp (star of Zen Noir). The Catastrophe is dedicated to imprisoned Iranian filmmakers Mohammad Rasoulof and Jafar Panahi.
