= Josh Dolan =

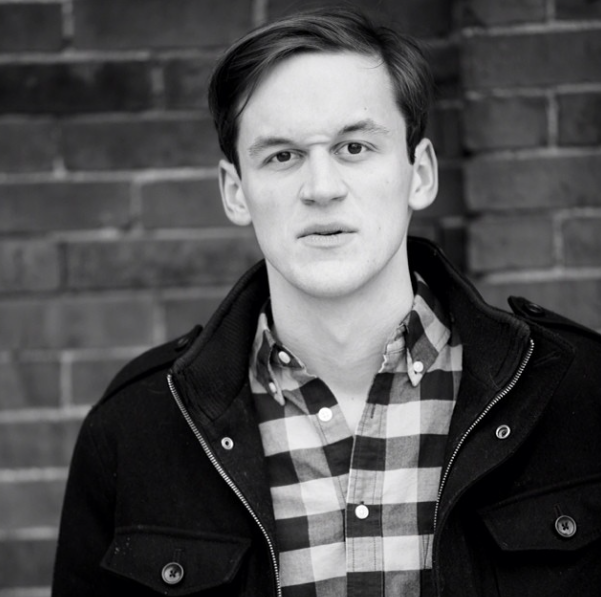
Comedian Josh Dolan

Josh Dolan (born August 14, 1991) is an American stand-up comedian, radio personality, actor, and podcast host based in Boston, Massachusetts. He is a member of the Boston Bruins Alumni and is known for his radio work with WAAF, hosting podcasts such as Breaking The Ice and Chirping Zebras, and appearances on Dirty Water TV (NESN). Dolan is also on-air at 100.1 FM The Pike (WWFX) in Worcester, Massachusetts, where he contributes regularly to The Mike Hsu Morning Show.

== Personal life ==
Dolan grew up in Ayer, Massachusetts. In 2013, he was cast in the award-winning TV show The Folklorist. Josh was a co-producer on the Boston, MA radio show, The Hill-Man Morning Show on WAAF (FM). Josh was also a contributor as a Boston Bruins Beat Reporter for WEEI.com before leaving the position to return to WAAF. Dolan was a part of the Matty and Nick Show on WAAF until the cancellation of the show in 2019. Dolan was the producer and co-host of the new afternoon drive show on WAAF with Mike Hsu until WAAF went off the air in February 2020. He has done a lot of charity work with the Boston Bruins Alumni and regularly plays in charity hockey games.

Josh Dolan has hosted the well-known Boston podcast called Breaking The Ice Podcast, along with former WAAF personalities Mike Hsu and Isaiah Moskowitz.

He has also served as host on Dirty Water TV on NESN.
