= Cathy Mitchell =

Cathy Mitchell may refer to:

- Cathy Mitchell (television personality), infomercial host and author
- Cathy Mitchell (politician), American politician

== See also ==
- Kathy Mitchell
