= BLTV =

BLTV may refer to:

- Beautiful Life Television, formerly known as Buddha's Light Television, a television station in Taiwan
- Boston Latino TV, a 2003–13 television show on Boston Neighborhood Network
- Birmingham Local TV
