= Jumpsuit (band) =

American band

Jumpsuit is an American rock and roll band from Chicago. Together since the late 1970s when they were little more than casio and tambourine street performers, Jumpsuit has gone on to release several 7-inch singles throughout the 90s and 2000s, as well as a full-length compact disc in 2005. Jumpsuit also stars in a television cartoon series that relates their trials and tribulations that come as a result of discovering a time machine. In the series, the members of Jumpsuit attempt to use their time machine to right past wrongs and regrets in their lives; however they are usually foiled by mechanical doppelgängers that follow them through the fourth dimension. Jumpsuit's live rock shows are often presented as live-action recreations of events from the cartoon. Their most recent TV appearance on Chic-A-Go-Go brought out a new generation of fans, many still in diapers.

Jumpsuit is sponsored by Tomahawk Shoes and Amplifiers.

== Discography ==
- 1997 - Pallet Jack book'n'record Lucky 13
- 2003 - Paperdolls 7-inch EP Make or Break Records
- 2005 - Regret CD, Make or Break Records
- 2006 - School/No Statue 7-inch Make or Break Records
- 2007 "Cowtown: The Musical: The Opera" CD, Make or Break Records
- 2011 "Too Funky for the Rock and the Roll" LP, Make or Break Records
