= Bald cap =

Wig-like cap simulating the appearance of a bald or partially bald head

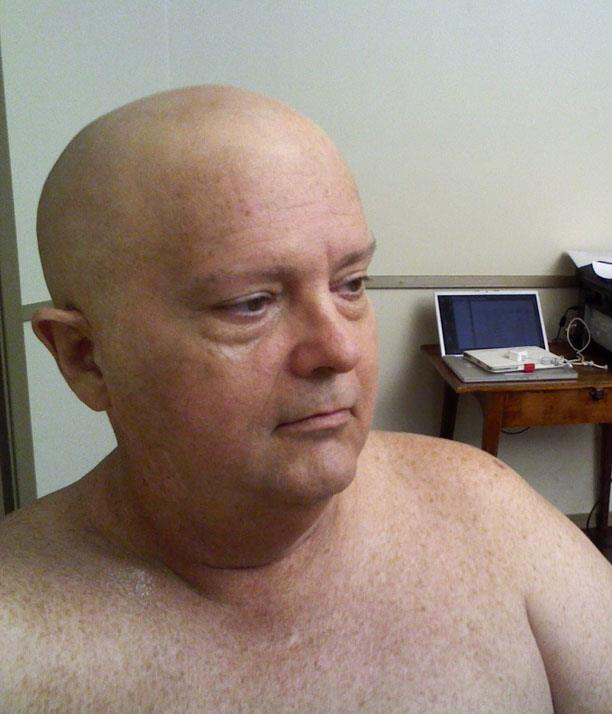
Actor Michael Q. Schmidt in a bald cap

A bald cap is a wig-like cap simulating the appearance of a bald or partially bald head. As part of an actor's make-up, it is often used to make a person appear older. Bald caps are a versatile medium. They form the basis of many creative fantasy make-ups.

Bald caps may be purchased ready-made or be constructed on-site by a make-up artist, who applies several layers of liquid plastic (such as latex) to a pattern made by covering the actor's head in clingfilm. The finished cap is glued to the actor's head with spirit gum or surgical adhesive, and the edges of the cap are blended with the actor's skin using make-up techniques. Almost any colour medium can be applied to the bald cap to give it colour and texture for creating a bald look, to blending in with skin tones.

Bald caps used in the theatre are made of thicker rubber, intended to be put on and off rapidly and multiple times. Coarser and more unrealistic bald caps are sometimes also used as part of a clown costume. They may also be made of plastic.

Bald caps may also be used for occasions when an actor who has hair wishes to act as if they are wearing a wig to cover up their baldness. In this case, the actor will wear a bald cap with a wig on top; the wig can be removed to reveal the "baldness" beneath. This trick received notable use in the "Earthanasia" episode of the British comedy program, The Goodies.
