= Michael Q. Schmidt =

American actor (1953–2025)

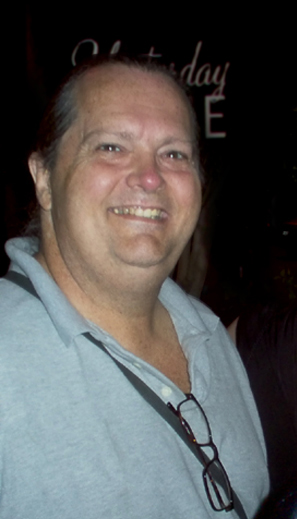
- Schmidt in 2006
- Born: Michael Quentin Schmidt; April 20, 1953; Whittier, California, U.S.
- Died: August 20, 2025 (aged 72)
- Occupations: Art model, actor
- Years active: 1990s–2025
- Website: mqschmidt.com

Michael Quentin Schmidt (April 20, 1953 – August 20, 2025) was an American actor and art model. According to Film Threat, he had become much in demand owing "to his versatility and his willingness to take roles to wild extremes".

== Early life and modeling ==
Michael Schmidt was born to Fred W. Schmidt and Marie Slyker. Schmidt worked as a model from the late 1990s, posing for art classes and for live art installations. He was used as the body model to create the animated mountain troll for the 2001 film Harry Potter and the Sorcerer's Stone.

== Television roles ==
In 2003, Schmidt's modeling work led to an ongoing series of live appearances as a model for Let's Paint TV, an interactive call-in television show where host and artist John Kilduff instructs on painting while simultaneously running on a treadmill, preparing food or drink, and fielding uncensored phone calls. Schmidt became part of the Tim & Eric team when in 2004 he joined their acclaimed Tom Goes to the Mayor, broadcast on Cartoon Network's Adult Swim. Additionally, their Adult Swim series Tim and Eric Awesome Show, Great Job (TEASGJ) features Schmidt in various episodes, where he is listed as among the Top Ten Favorite Recurring Characters. In August 2007, he performed at The Troubadour in Hollywood in a live version of the show entitled "Muscles for Bones" featuring "Weird Al" Yankovic, and followed in November 2007 with the Tim and Eric Awesome Show Live performance at Caesars Palace as part of The Comedy Festival. He performed at the Tim and Eric Live 2009 shows in San Diego and Anaheim, California.

Schmidt's other television work included appearances on Jimmy Kimmel Live!, Penn & Teller's Bullshit, Janice Dickinson Modeling Agency, Sunset Tan and Comedy Central's Distraction. Schmidt worked primarily in independent productions. His first major film role was in Naked Shadows, filmed in 2003 and released in 2006. Schmidt's next lead roles were in Flesh Pit (2004), Skeletons in the Closet (2005), and multiple roles in The Three Trials (2006). His most recent feature film role was in Snatched (2009).

== Film roles ==
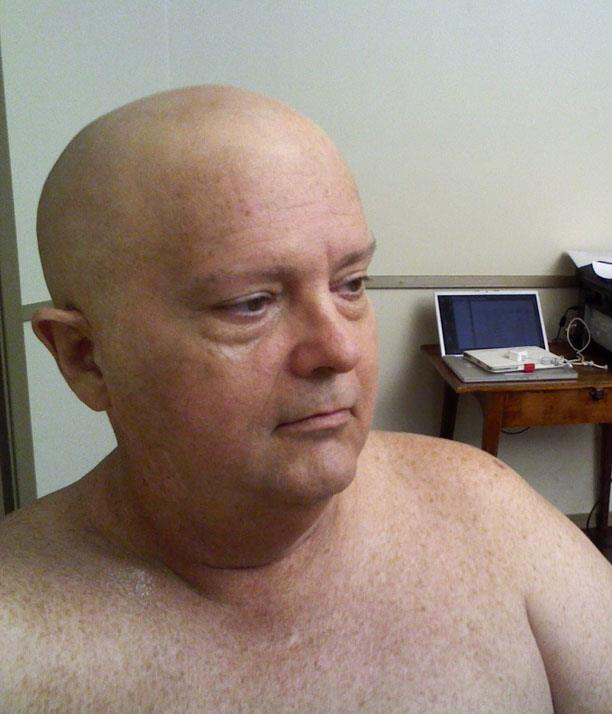
Schmidt in a bald cap while on set for a music video shooting (April 2013)

Schmidt had numerous bit parts in films and portrayed various characters as a supporting actor in independent films and film shorts, including roles as 'Texas' George Gant in Rebel Studz: The Uncensored Documentary (2007), Billy Bob Barfield in Fear Ever After (2007), and Chug Skivens in Pretty Twisted (2009). He was cast to play Rembrandt's Diana at Bath in the 2010 release of Caravaggio: The Search directed by Maureen Murphy.

Schmidt also made featured appearances in numerous music videos, including M.I.A.'s 2010 video for "Born Free", Flesh-n-Bone's 2011 video for "How Many", Pierce the Veil's 2012 video for "King for a Day", Motionless in White's 2013 video for "A-M-E-R-I-C-A", Lil Debbie's 2014 video for "Work The Middle", Waters' 2014 video for "I Feel Everything", and Charming Liars' 2015 video for "Burn".

== Death ==
Schmidt died on August 20, 2025, at the age of 72.

== Partial filmography ==
=== Television ===
- Let's Paint TV (11 episodes 2004–2015)
- Tom Goes to the Mayor (28 episodes 2004–2006)
- Distraction (6 episodes 2005–2006)
- Penn & Teller: Bullshit! (2005)
- Totally Busted (2005)
- North Mission Road (2005)
- Attack of the Show! (2006)
- Tim and Eric Awesome Show, Great Job! (9 episodes 2007–2008)
- Jimmy Kimmel Live! (2007)
- Praise the Lord (2007)
- Tim and Eric Nite Live! (4 episodes 2007)
- Poorman's Bikini Beach (2008)
- The Gong Show with Dave Attell (2008)
- James Gunn's PG Porn (2008)
- Tim and Eric Awesome Show, Great Job! Chrimbus Special (2010)

=== Film ===
- Harry Potter and the Sorcerer's Stone (2001)
- Schmucks (2001)
- The Decay of Fiction (2002)
- Santa Claus Versus the Christmas Vixens (2002)
- Hired (2004)
- Clean (2004)
- Tooth Radio (2004)
- Streakers (2004)
- Flesh Pit (2004)
- The Green Book (2004)
- The Confession (2005)
- Skeletons in the Closet (2005)
- Temporary (2005)
- Tears of a Clown (2005)
- Ninja What? (2005)
- A Happy Ending (2005)
- Coming Home (2005)
- A Happy Ending (2005)
- Dancing with Pain (2006)
- Shadow Man (2006)
- Axegrinder (2006)
- Corporate ThugZ (2006)
- The Three Trials (2006)
- 18 Fingers of Death! (2006)
- Huge Naked Guy (2006)
- Naked Shadows (2006)
- Fear Ever After (2007)
- Skid Marks (2007)
- Delaney (2008)
- A Very Peanus Christmas (2008)
- Cost of Living (2009)
- Snatched! (2009)
- Screening Room (2010)
- Forfeit of Grace (2010)
- Anti-Samartine Hotline (2010)
- Welcome Back Satan (2010)
- Camp Virginovich (2010)
- Caravaggio: The Search (2010)
- Tim and Eric's Billion Dollar Movie (2012)
- Hamlet A.D.D. (2014)
