= The Mr. Science Show =

- Genre: Educational
- Created by: Roger Cohen
- Developed by: Jerry Schuman
- Directed by: Tim Perkins
- Presented by: Tim Perkins
- Starring: Tim Perkins

Production
- Executive producer: Jerry Schuman
- Producer: Tim Perkins
- Production locations: Melbourne, Florida, United States
- Editor: Mike Fry
- Camera setup: Mike Fry
- Running time: 60 minutes

Original release
- Network: Time Warner Cable
- Release: 1992 – 1995

The Mr. Science Show was a lecture based science television program for children developed by Tim Perkins, which aired weekly in the 1990s on Time Warner Cable's Public-access television cable TV channel. The program was produced in Melbourne, Florida, United States. The show utilized simple science experiments, silly stories, and stunts to explain specific concepts in science.

== History ==
A Central Florida cable television program titled Cable Goes To School, which was produced by Time Warner Cable, aired a segment introducing a series of live science education shows at a small theatre in Melbourne, Florida. The live science education shows initially were developed to promote The Science Fare science supply stores. After airing the program, which explained magnets and magnetism, the first standalone episodes of The Mr. Science Show were produced to feature additional science topics. With Tim Perkins in the role of Mr. Science, a name bestowed by the children in the audience. The first standalone episodes of the Mr. Science Show were produced with each show featuring an in depth review of a particular science topic.

The Mr. Science Show first aired on Time Warner Cable as a Public-access television show in 1992 with Tim Perkins as Mister Science. In the 60 minute shows Perkins played a science enthusiast who offered several experiments mixed with stories which taught something about a particular area of science. The experiments often involved the children from the audience and were often simple enough to be tried by viewers. The presentations were delivered in a humorous way and there was always something that would go wrong, thus providing viewers with an example of what not to do.

== Distribution ==
The Mr. Science Science Shows were taped live and distributed freely as educational fillers to other Time Warner Cable facilities where they were seen sporadically by audiences in the United States. Over 50 programs were scripted but only a few were actually produced and broadcast. The live tapings were sometimes attended by hundreds of children from Brevard County Public Schools. Some Florida schools used donated footage from The Mr. Science Show for producing Public Service Announcements in their school's television production studios.

== See also ==
- Beakman's World
- Bill Nye the Science Guy
- Bob & Ray
- The Sinbad Show
- Watch Mr. Wizard
