= Mia Park =

American actress

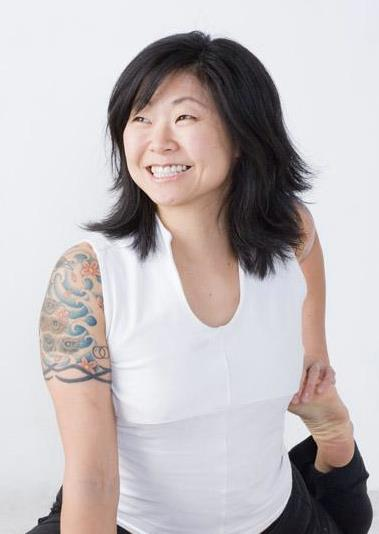
Mia Park

Mia Park is an American TV show host, actress, drummer, and yoga instructor based in Chicago. She is the long-time host of the children's dance show Chic-a-Go-Go, and co-founder of Chicago's A-Squared Theatre Workshop.

== Early life and education ==
Mia Chan Mi Park was born in Philadelphia. She attended Shimer College, graduating with distinction in 1995. Then located in Waukegan, Illinois and currently located in Chicago, Shimer is a Great Books college with a four-year core curriculum.

== Performance career ==
Park is the host of the Chicago underground children's show Chic-a-Go-Go, "a dance show for kids of all ages". Lonely Planet described the show as "a kiddie version of Soul Train." Reviews of the show frequently focus on Park's "deliriously chipper" style or "always-up rock-n-roll demeanor". She has hosted Chic-A-Go-Go since 1998. Her connection to Chic-a-Go-Go actually goes back to the very first show in 1996, when her then-boyfriend's band performed as the show's first musical guest, and she appeared as a dancer. Park, who typically moves rapidly from one project to another, has described the show as "the longest thing I've ever done in my life."

As the host (or co-host, as the host is nominally hosted by the rat puppet Ratso), Park interviews the guest musical groups after their performances. In a 2012 Chicago Reader feature, she complained about having missed the opportunity to interview Duran Duran due to a scheduling mixup; In August of the same year, however, Nick Rhodes of Duran Duran made good on their original promise.

A drummer and percussionist, Park began performing in bands in 1995. Many of the bands in which she performs are all-female and/or all-Asian, including Kim (which she described as a "pop-rock, punk-out, all-female Asian band") and Pook Nury (a Korean female drum group). As of 2012, she was a percussionist for the all-female pop orchestra Girl Group Chicago.

Park appeared in a January 3, 1999 episode of MTV's 120 Minutes as a special correspondent. She won a contest from radio station Q101. It was for their Q101 Twisted 5 Holiday Concert. During the episode she interviewed Beck, Everlast, and Soul Coughing.

In 2001, she wrote of the challenges facing rock groups of this kind:

When I tell people that I am the drummer for an all-Asian American female rock band, I don't expect to be taken seriously. There aren't any other bands like Kim in Chicago, let along in america, so I don't expect the masses to comprehend that, YES, women rock, and that, YES, Asian American women also rock ... and we rock hard, dammit!

Park organizes an annual event of one-night-only female cover bands performing to benefit the homeless, called "Covers for Cover."

Park is a co-founder of Chicago's A-Squared Theatre Workshop, the city's only pan-Asian theater troupe. She conceived of and appeared in the company's highly successful 2012 production My Asian Mom, a series of eight short one-person plays by Asian performers about their mothers. Park's contribution, which dealt with her grandmother's escape from North Korea and also involved a lengthy handstand, attracted particular attention.

Park is an advocate for Asian American representation in theatre. From the Chicago Sun-Times: "For decades, “Chicago Med” regular Mia Park has seen race used as an excuse for lazy or uninformed casting. On the one side, she constantly hears the refrain that Asian-American actors — whether their roots are in Hawaii or India or China or Pakistan — are hard to find. On the other edge, there’s the belief that they simply aren’t right for shows that don’t deal specifically with Asian storylines or characters. Park has a succinct response: “It’s all bulls—,” she said. “The talent base in Chicago alone is huge. And unless ethnicity or culture is specifically written into a character to help drive a story? There’s no reason you can’t cast someone who looks like me.”

In 2006, Mia co-founded the Asian American theater company, A-Squared Theatre Workshop and ran the Chicago Asian American Acting Industry Group which hosted educational acting workshops and supported local Asian American talent. She currently runs the Our Perspective: Asian American Plays program.

== Filmography ==
=== Film ===
Year	Title	Role	Notes	Ref.
2006	The Lake House	Receptionist		
2007	The Minx	Linnea Chiang		
2017	Signature Move	Bookstore Customer		

=== Television ===
Year	Title	Role	Notes
2008	Pancake Mountain	Miss Mia	2 episodes
2011	Boss	Clinic Volunteer	4 episodes
2012	Shameless	Korean Liquor Store Wife	Episode: Just Like the Pilgrims Intended
2013–16	Chicago Fire	Nurse	4 episodes
2016	Chicago P.D.	Nurse Beth	Episode: She's Got Us
2016–19	Chicago Med	Nurse Beth	28 episodes
2017	APB	Korean Woman	Episode: Fueling Fires
2018	Empire	Nurse	Episode: Sweet Sorrow
2019	Code-Switched	Kevin's Mom	

=== Shorts ===
Year	Title	Role	Notes
2009	At Last, Okemah!	Record Store Owner	
2011	Instant Slapping		
2011	The Catastrophe	Mrs. Kimballton	
2013	4 Seconds: Ricky Hustile's Last Shot at the NBA	Yoga Instructor	

== Other activities ==
Park has worked as a yoga instructor since 2006.

== Works cited ==
- Park, Mia Chan Mi (2001). "Waving Fans". In Vickie Nam (ed.). Yell-Oh Girls!: Emerging Voices Explore Culture, Identity, and Growing Up Asian American. Harper Collins. pp. 269–270. ISBN 0060959444.
