= NewTV =

Community media center in Newton, Massachusetts

NewTV is Newton, Massachusetts’ community media center, paid for through fees assessed on local cable bills.

Residents of the City of Newton, members of Newton-based non-profit organizations, employees of Newton businesses and City of Newton employees are eligible to become members of NewTV. NewTV offers services to the community, including production services, original programming and training.

== History ==
In the 1980s, Newton’s Mayor, Theodore D. Mann, traveled to cities around the US and saw that independent public access television stations were being established. He wanted to see that happen in Newton. At the time, Continental Cable held the local access facilities and channels. Mayor Mann got to work organizing community members to form NewTV’s first Board of Directors. By 1990, this Board was established and set out to find a home and employees for NewTV. Construction began at the NewTV facility in 1991 and it opened on June 7, 1992.

NewTV spent its first fifteen years at its Lincoln Street location. There, it expanded from a single channel (NewTV 13) to a three-channel line-up (community, education and government). In 1994, NewTV began producing Newton News, a weekly news program. In 2006, NewTV moved to its current Needham Street location. In 2013 they did a build-out to expand the facility to approximately 7000 square feet. On October 3, 2013, NewTV launched an HD channel through a partnership with RCN. NewTV was the second public access television station to be offered an HD channel in Massachusetts. NewTV now has three HD channels with RCN.

The station is funded by a 5% fee paid by cable TV providers Verizon, Comcast and RCN. It also collects membership fees from participants and holds fund-raisers.

== Programming ==
NewTV operates three separate television channels, each designated for public, educational, or governmental content, since NewTV is a P.E.G. station. According to the Boston Globe, "Residents of Newton, members of Newton-based nonprofit organizations, employees of Newton businesses, and Newton municipal employees are eligible to use NewTV: to get free use of TV production equipment and facilities, cable TV channel time, and training in TV production, media literacy, and Internet access."

The Community Channel features programs produced by members of the Newton community or programs sponsored by members of the Newton community. This channel provides a forum for free speech and self expression. Some programs have been distributed statewide, or even nationwide.

The Education Channel features programming produced by members of the public and private school community in Newton, whether it be parents, students, school administrators or interns. Since the programming on this channel is monitored for educational content it is not a public forum like the other two channels.

The Government Channel features coverage of public municipal meetings. There is also programming produced in collaboration with municipal and state departments that focus on issues affecting Newton.

=== Other programming ===
Newton News is a half-hour weekly news program focused on news happening in Newton. The program is produced by a news director and most reporting is done by interns. Many interns have gone on to professional success in broadcast journalism. The program airs on all three channels.

The Original Programming department produced narrative content that was distributed throughout the nation, the most notable of which was The Folklorist. This series shows on all three channels

NewTV has a production services department to produce client videos.

In January 2004, and again in January 2005, disputes arose over the airing of a news program called Mosaic: World News from the Middle East. Opponents argued that the program provides a distorted view of Arab broadcasts, a venue for antisemitism, anti-Americanism, and "terrorist propaganda". Supporters of the program, while conceding that the broadcasts may on occasion contain "anti-Semitic and anti-American content" argued that episodes "give Americans a diverse array of information about how the country is portrayed in the Middle East", and that their broadcast is a free speech issue. Mosaic has also been criticized by the Committee for Accuracy in Middle East Reporting in America, which claims it "whitewashes terrorism and promotes extremism". Objections to Mosaic centered around the programs use of news broadcasts produced by the Hezbollah-run Al Manar television; Al Manar was designated a Specially Designated Global Terrorist organization by the United States in 2004.

In 2004 local environmental activists used the station's equipment to produce a documentary film about the Angino family farm, the last farm in Newton, as part of a campaign that persuaded the town to preserve the farmland from development.
