= Lavender Lounge =

Public-access TV show

Lavender Lounge was a public access television show in San Francisco that aired from 1991 to 1995, one of the first of its kind in the United States. Mark Kliem was the creator and executive producer of Lavender Lounge, nicknamed "The Queer American Bandstand". In addition to dancers invited from the general public, Lavender Lounge frequently featured LGBTQ+ artists, drag queens and performers such as the queer punk band Pansy Division, Elvis Herselvis, and the Acid Housewives, the latter of whom the New York Times, reviewing Lavender Lounge, described as " three men in psychedelic-colored housedresses".

The format of the show was a "TV Dance Party for Gay Boys and Girls", with members of the public invited to dance in the studio to recorded music interspersed with guest performers. It was patterned after Dick Clark's American Bandstand and John Waters's Hairspray, but aimed at a gay and lesbian audience.

Sixty episodes of the Lavender Lounge television show were created, including being named "Official Video" of GLBTQ Pride Parade" in 1993 and 1994, plus "Official Video" of Halloween In The Castro 1992 and 1993.

Segments of Lavender Lounge were screened at the Los Angeles Gay Film Festival and the Fresno Gay Film Festival. During a six-month period in 1994, episodes of the show were broadcast on satellite reaching from Alaska to Puerto Rico.

In 1994 and 1995, Lavender Lounge was aired on both the Public-access television channel and the leased access channel in San Francisco. It was one of the most popular Public-access television shows ever aired in San Francisco.
