= Let's Paint TV =

- Created by: John Kilduff
- Developed by: John Kilduff
- Starring: John Kilduff
- Country of origin: United States
- Original language: English

Production
- Producer: John Kilduff
- Production locations: Eagle Rock, Los Angeles, California (2001-2008); Van Nuys, Los Angeles, California (2009-present)
- Running time: 60 minutes (public access & online)

Original release
- Network: Public Access TV
- Release: 2002 – present

Let's Paint TV is an American television show hosted by artist John Kilduff.

The show is best noted for its live episodes, which consist of the host painting while he runs on a treadmill; in addition, he sometimes takes calls from viewers, cooks food, plays ping pong, or makes blended drinks. The show's episode titles typically reflect whatever tasks are being undertaken, for example, Let's Paint, Exercise, and Play Ping Pong.

Let's Paint TV was originally broadcast on Los Angeles Public-access television cable TV from 2001 through 2008; after the LA public access studios were shut down in early 2008, the show transitioned to being an online-only program. The program began receiving world-wide attention in 2006 when Kilduff began uploading video clips of his show to YouTube.

== Show information ==
John Kilduff conceived the idea for Let's Paint TV while working on a different comedy Public-access show. He was waiting for a Saddam Hussein impersonator to arrive and began thinking about his "exercise bike in the storage room, and I thought visually painting on an exercise bike could be interesting." He eventually decided that a treadmill would be more feasible for painting than an exercise bike.

John Kilduff claims his aim with the series is to make people of all skill levels try their hand at painting or other forms of creative self-expression. Kilduff frequently encourages viewers to use very large brushes in order to cover the canvas as quickly as possible before worrying about details, as he feels an empty canvas can be very intimidating to novices.

Although Kilduff says that the show is meant to inspire creativity in others, many of the callers he gets tend not to take him seriously. As the show was once on Public-access TV and is now on the internet, there is little to no censoring. The show also lacks caller screening. Many take advantage of this by expressing prejudice, cursing, accosting members of the show, and making derogatory comments about rival gangs. Despite the overwhelming number of prank callers, John generally continues to take calls.

The sight of an artist simultaneously jogging, painting, blending drinks, and chatting to guests and painting live models has led some to speculate that the whole show is an ironic piece of performance art. Kilduff denies this and states that he is completely sincere in trying to encourage people to do something creative.

=== Terrestrial television run ===
The show originally began airing on Time Warner Public-access television in Los Angeles in 2001 and is now being seen in New York City and London. Clips of the show appeared on TV's Naughtiest Blunders in 2005 airing on England's ITV television network, and in 2008 on Whacked Out Videos.

Let's Paint TV became more widely known in late 2006 when Kilduff began uploading recordings of episodes to the online video service YouTube, where it has since become a cult hit and increased his live show's viewership.

=== Transition to internet television ===
On December 6, 2008, the last episode of the Public-access TV version of Lets Paint TV was taped. The Public-access TV studios in the City of Los Angeles shut down on December 31, 2008.

The show currently streams live Monday through Friday 11am-12:00pm PST on letspainttv.com.

== Reviews ==
LA Weekly warmly reviewed the show, saying that "it jettisons the inverse snobbery of the Bob Ross tradition, assuming a sophisticated audience informed by the inescapable influence of Modernism and the indeterminate sincerity of post–Saturday Night Live television. It turns out Let’s Paint TV is indeed a clever parody of Bob Ross and company, but — like so much parody, from Don Quixote to the novelty music of Spike Jones — this one turns out to be better art than that at which it pokes fun."

The Village Voice noted that "Kilduff makes the average multitasker look like a slacker."

CBS's Mancave Daily, using images of Kilduff throughout their article, spoke about Let's Paint TV and wrote, "it displays all that is wrong and entertaining about public access television". In revisiting Kilduff in 2014, they examined his broadcasting on YouTube and Stickam and his use of a treadmill for his multi-tasking, and observed "If this isn’t the epitome of public access television, I don’t know what is".

== John Kilduff ==
John Kilduff, the show's host, is an artist and longtime Los Angeles resident. He received comedic training at The Groundlings, studied improv at Los Angeles City College, and attended the Otis/Parsons Art Institute. In 2008 he received a Master of Fine Arts degree from UCLA.

Kilduff has appeared as a guest on The Tyra Banks Show, where he painted Banks' portrait. He appeared on the red carpet for the VH1 2006 Big Awards, and painted David Hasselhoff's portrait on the second season of America's Got Talent. Kilduff was also filmed painting and jogging for a 2006 USA Network commercial.

LA Weekly notes that during most episodes of Let's Paint TV, Kilduff wears "his trademark crumpled and paint-stained Brooks Brothers suit." In order to avoid working a day job, Kilduff sells many of his paintings at art fairs around California. He has appeared at several art shows throughout Southern California, often running on his treadmill, painting, and doing various other activities while museum patrons look on.

== Partial guest cast ==
- John Kilduff
- Paul Kilduff (John's Brother)
- Eric André
- Michael Q. Schmidt
- Zach Galifianakis
- Deborah Hunter
- Inga Svorkist
- James Evans
- Kelly Taylor
- Frozen Plastic (musicians)
- Los Cremators (musicians)
- Mondo (musicians)
- Ultraviolet Eye (musicians)
- Rahdunes (musicians)
- Anal Holocaust (musicians)
- Lamont Paul
- Josh Robert Thompson
- Mark Wentzel
- Cannon Kelly
- Paulette Nichols
- Ask a Chola
- Venus Alexa
- Bernard Nacion
- Gabe Rothschild
- Molly Barnes
- Raymond Chavez
- Irish Kid Charles
- Francine Dancer
- Melfon (KROQ morning show supergroup)
