= The Basement Sublet of Horror =

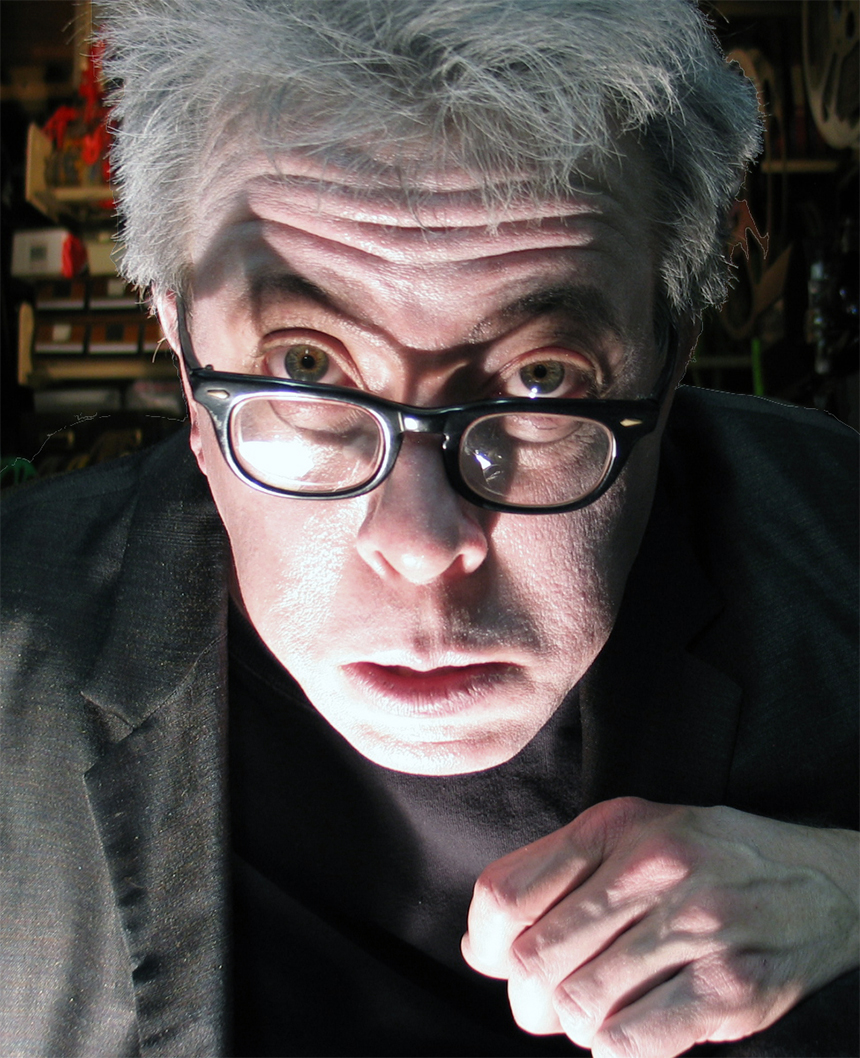
- Host Gunther Dedmund
- Genre: Horror Host, Horror, cult
- Created by: Demolition Kitchen Video
- Starring: Gunther Dedmund
- Theme music composer: Audio Junkfood Recordings
- Opening theme: "The Basement Sublet of Horror"
- Country of origin: United States
- Original language: English
- No. of seasons: 18 (Seasons, not by year)
- No. of episodes: 230

Production
- Executive producer: Demolition Kitchen Video
- Production locations: Lawrence, KS
- Running time: 90 min.
- Production company: Demolition Kitchen Video

Original release
- Release: June 13, 2006 – present

The Basement Sublet of Horror is a self-produced Public-access television cable TV show by Joel Sanderson. The show uses a tongue-in-cheek approach to screen altered feature films intercut with cartoons, educational and instructional videos in such a way to create a new condensed feature that collages visual puns and humorous subplots. The host of the show is the fictional Gunther Dedmund, played by Joel Sanderson.

== Background ==
The Basement Sublet of Horror is based on a long tradition of late-night television horror movie hosts that began in the 1950s with Vampira. Wichita, Kansas had its own horror host show, called The Host and Rodney, from the late 1950s through the 1970s starring Tom Leahy. It seems to have been the very first Horror Host show in the country, as it did not carry the "Shock Theater" package common to shows of the time, and was created from scratch by the station.

The Basement Sublet of Horror follows a long history of horror hosts that play horror films on television that have had a nationwide cult following for decades. Several generations of fans have grown up watching late-night Horror Host programs, at once becoming erstwhile film students and cinema aficionados, and also networking with other fans around the country. With the development of the Internet and cable television, horror host shows have seen a revival likened to the drive-in resurgence of indoor theaters that present exploitation.

These Horror Hosts include the likes of Ghoulardi, Elvira, and Joe Bob Briggs, who was the host of "Drive-In Theater" on Showtime, and "MonsterVision" on TNT.

== Development ==
The Basement Sublet of Horror first started screening in June 2006. Prior to that date, Joel Sanderson had been involved in producing live events in the Kansas area for over thirty years. His first film production was the Escape’ Drive-in which began in 1989, the show featured a combination of re-edited educational films, re-edited feature films, and live music. The show moved indoors in 1994 and became the M.T. Pockets Budget Film Festival with a three-year run at the Free State Brewery in Lawrence, Kansas, followed by an eight-year run at the Wichita Center for the Arts.

== Characters ==
The host of The Basement Sublet of Horror is Gunther Dedmund, a fictional character that Joel Sanderson plays. Another character in the show, Richard Wayne, is also played by Joel Sanderson. Several other characters have appeared in the six seasons of the show that have been broadcast so far, including several of Gunther's landlords (David Bagsby), his boss Roger Slacks (Tim Manning), his neighbor (David Bagsby), a rival TV host Rusty Trees (Tim Manning), a country western singer named Tex LeBeauf (Scott Phillips), Jake of "Jake's Mind Repair" (Fred Gutknecht), an emergency guest host (Fred Gutknecht), a gravedigger named Mr. Rule (KC Stanton), an Italian movie zombie (Gil Bavel), a UFO Expert (Gil Bavel), a giant red rabbit named Rapjack Rabbit (KC Stanton), Gunther's Aunt Ertha, Gunther's Aunt Bertha (Richard Davis), and a ghost named Lester Jenkins (Richard Davis).

Gunther Dedmund also likes to bring in special guest hosts, including Ol’ Flick, a classic Wichita, KS. TV host (Jim Erickson), Butch Cleaver, host of "Meet Cleaver Theatre" from Cincinnati, and author Scott Phillips (The Ice Harvest, Cottonwood).

== Publications ==
In 2012, The Basement Sublet of Horror stepped into the world of publishing by creating comic books and magazines. Both publications are related to the on-air program and are named Basement Sublet of Horror. Several established writers and artists have contributed to the publications, including Jon Niccum, Scott Philips, Rik 'Mr. Verlin' Livingston, Ben Urish, Dan Rempel, Greg Smallwood, Richard Chamberlain, Derek Koch, and Bill Goffrier (artist).

The magazine has also featured guest appearances by television hosts and film directors, including James 'Ol' Flick' Erickson, Butch R. Cleaver, Tom Leahy Jr., Andrew Rausch, and Roberta Solomon. Later issues featured interviews with artist Bradley Beard, Kansas filmmaker Lance Hayes, a tribute issue to director Christopher R. Mihm, Lawrence-based science fiction author James Gunn, horror director Leif Jonker, Topeka Special Effects Make-up Artist Jake Jackson, Host Gustopher Glitch, The Amazing Doktor Goulfinger, and Kansas City horror host Crematia Mortem.

The magazine was published for twenty-nine issues, along with seven Special Editions, and concluded its publication run, scheduled to end in 2026. The special editions issues produced included a Guide to the films Boris Karloff, the films of Bela Lugosi (both written by Richard Chamberlain), a complete reprinting of the BSOH Collector Card series, a 10th-anniversary scrapbook, a guide to the films made in Kansas, a "Best of BSOH" collection, and a special mini-book reprint of issue #10 of the magazine used as the liner notes for the Blu-ray release of Leif Jonker's "Darkness."
