= Cathy Mitchell (television personality) =

American television personality

Cathy Mitchell is an American author and television personality known for hosting "As seen on TV" infomercials. She was among the first infomercial hosts to emerge after the FCC began to allow program-length advertisements in the 1980s.

== Career ==
Mitchell is best known for hosting television infomercials for a wide range of products, such as the Chef-O-Matic Pro, the Sideshow Skillet, the Fry Pro 2, and the Turbo Cooker. She filmed her first infomercial in 1989, advertising the Snakmaster sandwich press. Mitchell chose to receive her payment as a commission on each unit sold, and the Snakmaster was highly successful. Prior to her television career, she had worked performing product demonstrations at fairs in California, including the State Fair.

In August 2008, Mitchell appeared in an infomercial parody alongside John C. Reilly on the TV show Tim and Eric Awesome Show, Great Job! hosted on Adult Swim. In 2014, Cathy Mitchell was featured on the Rachael Ray show. She participated in a Coffee Off with fellow pitchman Marc Gill which she lost by 8 cups.

=== Cookbooks ===
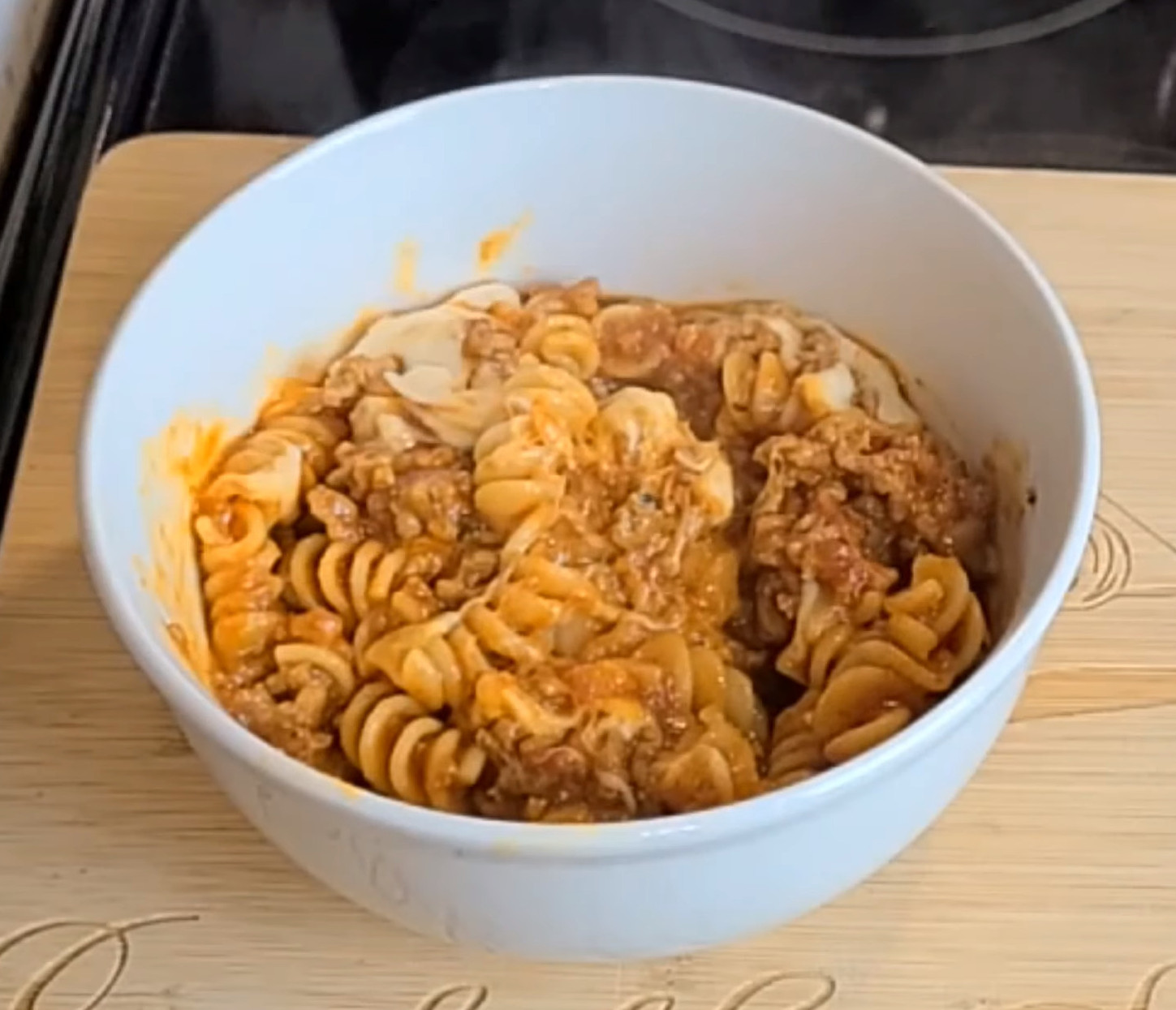
Skillet Pasta & Beef prepared according to Mitchell's Dump Dinners

Mitchell is the author of a number of cookbooks. Her first was Dump Cakes, a small book of recipes for dump cakes – cobbler-like desserts which are easily prepared by "dumping" fruit and packaged cake mix into a pan without mixing. It was published in 2014 by TeleBrands. She has also written a number of other cookbooks whose titles play on the "dump" template, including Dump Dinners and Crock Pot Dump Meals, all of which were advertised on the Steve Harvey Show and on HSN. The titles of these books have been the source of some ridicule, given the negative or scatological connotations of the word dump. Mitchell has acknowledged this, and suggested it may have contributed to the success of the books. Dump Cakes was featured in a humorous "As Seen on TV gift guide" segment of the late-night talk show Jimmy Kimmel Live!

Mitchell has also written Eat this Book where each page is made out of bake-able material and contains a guide of where to place ingredients.

== Bibliography ==
- Quick & Easy Dump Dinners and More (2014)
- Crockpot Dump Meals: 5 Ingredients or Less (2015)
- Red Copper Skillet Cooking (2017)

== Personal life ==
Mitchell lives in Valley Springs, California. She has five children.
