= Boston Latino TV =

US television program

- Genre: News; Entertainment; Celebrities; Sports
- Directed by: Digna Gerena
- Starring: Araminta Romero; Evelyn Reyes; Gil Matos; Clairemese Montero
- Opening theme: Boston Latino TV Theme
- Country of origin: United States
- Original language: English
- No. of seasons: 10

Production
- Executive producer: Digna Gerena

Original release
- Network: Boston Neighborhood Network (BNN)
- Release: April 2003 – present

Boston Latino TV (BLTv) is an English-language, culturally Latino production that utilizes new media to showcase the Latino presence in Boston on Public-access television cable TV. BLTv positively portrays the Latino culture through both, Latino hosts and on-site event video coverage, among English-Speaking Americans.

== Production team ==
- Digna Gerena - Executive Producer
- Araminta Romero - Director of Development
- Evelyn Reyes - Producer and Host
- Gil Matos - Producer and Host
- Clairemese Montero - Host
- Omar Cabrera - Host
- Tim Estiloz - Film Critic / Host
- LuzMar Centeno - Professional Photographer
- Marlene Sanchez - Production Assistant
