= Chicago Access Network Television =

Public access TV service in Chicago, Illinois, US

Ownership
- Owner: Chicago Access Corporation

History
- Founded: 1983

Links
- Website: http://www.cantv.org

Availability

Terrestrial
- Cable: Channels 19, 21, 27, 36, 42

Chicago Access Network Television (CAN TV) is a public, educational, and government access (PEG) cable television service in Chicago, Illinois. The organization is funded by cable companies as part of their cable franchise agreements with the City of Chicago. The companies are also required by law to carry the network's five channels.

== History ==
In 1983, the Chicago Access Corporation (CAC) was established by the City of Chicago as an independent nonprofit tasked with managing the public access channels in Chicago.

== Channels ==
CAN TV operates five cable television channels in Chicago. They are available on AT&T, Comcast, RCN, and WOW:

- CAN TV19: Public Affairs, entertainment, documentary and arts
- CAN TV21: Live, call-in Hotline shows, community events and arts coverage
- CAN TV27: 24/7 local news and information
- CAN TV36: Religious and inspirational programming
- CAN TV42: Interactive community bulletin board with blues and jazz from WDCB-FM

== Programming ==
Any Chicago nonprofit or resident can submit noncommercial content to CAN TV for free, and over 10,000 new, local programs are shown on the network every year. Submitted videos include independent productions and programs made using equipment and facilities provided by CAN TV.

Groups who produce programs using CAN TV's publicly accessible studio and equipment represent a wide range of communities, including seniors, attorneys, and people with disabilities.

Chicago-based nonprofits also host live call-in shows from a dedicated studio at CAN TV. These programs are shown live on cable television in Chicago and online, with topics including youth media training, neighborhood development, and domestic violence.

CAN TV also provides unedited coverage of community events in Chicago, offering live coverage of some events on cable television and online. Past coverage includes public forums, political events like protests and hearings, and arts events.

Programs produced by CAN TV include:

- Chicago Newsroom, where journalists and newsmakers analyze the week's top local stories.
- Perspectivas Latinas, which highlights community organizations serving the Latino community in Chicago.
- Political Forum, which gives Chicagoans a direct line to their government.

Past community-produced programs on CAN TV include:

- Chic-a-go-go
- JBTV
- Labor Beat
- SAIC's ExTV

Independent programming carried on CAN TV includes:

- Free Speech TV
- Illinois Channel

== Training and Equipment Access ==
Chicago residents can choose from a wide range of classes at CAN TV to gain the skills needed to make a video. After becoming members, residents then get access to the equipment they trained to use, including digital cameras, edit suites, and a TV studio.

== Controversy ==
In September 2023, the South Side Weekly published an article reporting issues that had arisen under the leadership of the new executive director, Darrious Hilmon. The concerns current and former staff raised in the article included the station's poor use of funds, an anti-union workplace culture, and the prioritization of signature program production at the expense of employee's main job responsibilities. Community producers interviewed for the piece reported that the station shrank the resources it offered by cutting the amount of studio slots available for reservation, barring the public from using the props/prop room, and eradicating controversial community produced shows from its social media. CAN TV declined to provide a response for the article.

Allegations of anti-union practices continued in an article posted by the Chicago Reader. An incident where Raza Siddiqui, the then-president of the union which represents CAN TV workers, NABET-CWA Local 41, came to the television station to film a show instead of work was detailed in the article. Furthermore, an employee of the station described being unable to contact the union office about employee concerns. Siddiqui responded in a follow-up piece, writing, "Working with management is never a conflict of interest when it serves our members and when our goals are aligned such as with worker safety."

While CAN TV's debut in Crain's was positive, with a journalist praising the station's programming and executive director, subsequent articles were critical of the organization's direction. An article covering a Better Business Bureau complaint filed against the station by a long-term producer and board member was released almost a year after the first article. The article also covered updates on an ongoing lawsuit against the station from a former employee and community producers' ongoing concerns. CAN TV responded to Crain's with a letter, stating they, "[serve] in good faith and with due care to ensure that the organization operates in compliance with applicable law and best practices and is accountable to the communities it serves."

Another article from Crain's covered a board meeting at the station in which community producers, former employees, and former board members voiced concerns about the executive director's behavior. Ex-staff alleged they were fired because of conflict with the executive director and not for budgetary reasons, as the executive director had claimed. Hilmon, in response, said the comments were, "emblematic of an ongoing, coordinated effort to undermine [his] leadership and cause reputational harm to an important community asset." But allegations of unprofessional behavior were echoed in statements from members of the community and previous CAN TV board members, citing incidents where Hilmon fired entire departments at the station and pushed for board members to leave in response to criticism.

== See also ==
- List of public-access TV stations in the United States
