= The Folklorist =

- Genre: Factual television
- Starring: John Horrigan
- Country of origin: United States
- Original language: English
- No. of seasons: 1
- No. of episodes: 13

Production
- Executive producer: Robert Kelly
- Producers: Andrew Eldridge; Angela Harrer
- Production location: Newton, Massachusetts
- Running time: Approx. 22 minutes
- Production company: NewTV

Original release
- Network: NewTV
- Release: March 23, 2012 – October 15, 2015

The Folklorist is a television series produced by NewTV, a community access television station located in Newton, Massachusetts, United States. The series explores some of the unique and lesser-known stories throughout history. Each half-hour episode of the show contains three or four featured segments that go into the backstory and lasting effects of a particular topic of folklore or hidden history.

== History ==
In 2011, John Horrigan and the NewTV staff met to discuss the idea of creating a television program about folklore. The NewTV team filmed several segments and a pilot came together within the following months. After the pilot aired in March 2012, the public response was strong enough to continue producing more episodes. Andrew Eldridge and Angela Harrer joined the show as co-producers in 2012 and started working on the show's first season, which aired in 2013. The Folklorist is currently in its second season of production, and is available online, as well on Luken Communication's Family Channel, and is currently available through Comcast's and RCN's on-demand services in the New England region.

== Awards ==
- 2016 Winner of the Boston/New England Emmy Award for Outstanding Director Post Production
- 2016 Winner of the Boston/New England Emmy Award for Outstanding Cinematography Short Form
- 2015 Winner of the Boston/New England Emmy Award for Outstanding Writing
- 2015 Winner of the Boston/New England Emmy Award for Outstanding Editing
- 2015 Winner of the Boston/New England Emmy Award for Outstanding Director/Post Production
- 2015 Winner of the Boston/New England Emmy Award for Outstanding Performer/Narrator
- 2015 Winner of the Alliance for Community Media Hometown Award for Entertainment & Arts Series
- 2014 Winner of the Boston/New England Emmy Award for Outstanding Historical Program
- 2013 Winner of the Boston/New England Emmy Award for Outstanding Program Host/Moderator
- 2013 Winner of the ACM Northeast Video Festival for Best Historical and Cultural Program
- 2012 Winner of the Boston/New England Emmy Award for Best Single Spot Promotion

== Episodes ==
No.	Title	Original release date
1	"The Boston Molasses Flood, The Boston Massacre, New England's Dark Day, The Christmas Truce"	March 23, 2012
ohn Horrigan describes the flood of molasses in Boston in 1919, the events surrounding the Boston Massacre, an eerie change in weather in 1780 that rapidly affected New England, and an unexpected truce during the midst of World War II. Features short segments on Babe Ruth, Neil Armstrong, Santa Claus, the Titanic, and demons.
2	"The Cuban Missile Crisis, An American Army of Two, The Grasshopper & the Ant, Amelia Earhart"	January 1, 2013
Horrigan investigates the Cuban Missile Crisis, the story of the two girls who made up an army, Aesop's fable "The Grasshopper and the Ant", and a lesser-known tale of the great aviator Amelia Earhart. Also includes stories of the Vietnam War, The Pharaoh's Curse, and Julius Caesar being abducted by pirates.
3	"The Lady in Black, The Prince of Pirates, The Los Angeles Nuclear Meltdown, Porky's Prank"	October 1, 2013
The history behind infamous pirate Samuel Bellamy, an astounding prank that caused quite a boom, a Los Angeles cover-up of a nuclear meltdown, and the legend of the "Lady in Black" of Georges Island (Massachusetts). Includes short stories about George Washington, the 1906 San Francisco earthquake, and Dracula.
4	"The Hoosac Tunnel, The Great Moon Hoax, We Broadcast This Interruption, The Battle of LA"	October 15, 2013
Host John Horrigan describes the troubled construction of the Hoosac Tunnel, a series of fabricated articles published in the New York Sun, an attack on Los Angeles in 1942, and two signal intrusions, one in 1986 and another a year later in 1987. Includes "campfire" stories about Benjamin Franklin and Steve Jobs.
5	"The Lost City of Norumbega, The Legend of D. B. Cooper, The Poe Toaster, The Night the Stars Fell"	October 29, 2013
Stories of a lost legendary city in North America, a mystery hijacker who was never found, the enigmatic Poe Toaster, and a meteor shower that caused panic in 1833. Features tales about Christopher Columbus, Walt Disney, Aladdin, and Medusa.
6	"The Hurricane of 1938, The Tale of Nikola Tesla, Kilroy Was Here, The Grape Island Alarm"	November 12, 2013
Horrigan tells audiences about the great inventor Nikola Tesla, a reoccurring graffiti in WWII, a Revolutionary War effort on Grape Island (Norfolk County, Massachusetts), and a massive hurricane in New England. Features segments on Leonardo da Vinci and Muhammad Ali.
7	"The Robinson Crusoes of Wake Island, The Tornado That Saved Washington D.C., Springheeled Jack"	November 26, 2013
Stories about two men hiding in the midst of WWII on Wake Island, a tornado during the Burning of Washington in the War of 1812, and an eerie legend in English folklore. Includes "campfire" segments on Thomas Edison, Gertrude Ederle, and the Trojan Horse.
8	"The Ponzi Scheme, The Children's Blizzard, George Washington and the Poison Peas, The Dover Demon"	December 10, 2013
Host John Horrigan tells audiences of the roots of the Ponzi scheme, an assassination attempt on George Washington, an unsolved mysterious sighting of a creature in Dover, Massachusetts, and a blizzard in the Midwest that caught many children and families unaware. Also features descriptions of Albert Einstein, Jane Goodall, and Barack Obama.
9	"Shackleton's Voyage, The Gloucester Sea Serpent, Cottingley Fairies"	November 6, 2014
The story of an explorer's attempt to survive in a snowy wasteland, a town that descends into hysteria when visited by an unknown beast, and two young ladies enchant the world with their mystical photographs.
10	"New England Lighthouse Storm, Elizabeth Jennings, The Cardiff Giant"	November 20, 2014
Host John Horrigan tells a story of two brave men who hold their stations atop a doomed lighthouse, a woman who fights for her right to ride on a streetcar, and how an unbelievable discovery attracts the attention of the greatest showman on Earth.
11	"Angels of Mons, The Year without a Summer, The Wooden Horse"	December 4, 2014
The story of a divine intervention that helped turn the tide for the British Expeditionary Force in WWI, a mysterious weather anomaly that creates a panic across the world in 1816, and three WWII Prisoners of War who devised an ingenious plan to try and escape the German prison camp known as Stalag III.
12	"The Legend of Hugh Glass, Deborah Sampson, Gasparilla"	June 26, 2015
The stories of a famous frontiersman and his legendary fight for survival, a woman who disguised herself as a man in order to fight for her country, and the rise and fall of one of history's most famed pirates.
13	"The Legend of Princess Caraboo, Powder Alarm, Ape Canyon"	October 15, 2015
Stories of an eccentric woman who tricked her way into the aristocracy, five gold miners who found themselves under attack by a group of strange creatures, and a seizure of arms by the British that caused alarm in the American colonies.
