= Chic-a-Go-Go =

Chicago children's dance show

- Chic-a-Go-Go logo
- Created by: Jake Austen; Jacqueline Stewart
- Starring: Jake Austen; Mia Park
- Country of origin: United States
- No. of episodes: over 1,000

Production
- Producers: Jake Austen; Jacqueline Stewart
- Running time: 30 Minutes

Original release
- Network: Chicago Access Network Television
- Release: May 1996

Chic-a-Go-Go is a public-access television cable television children's dance show that airs on Chicago Access Network Television (CAN-TV). The show bills itself as "Chicago's Dance Show for Kids of All Ages".

== Show description ==
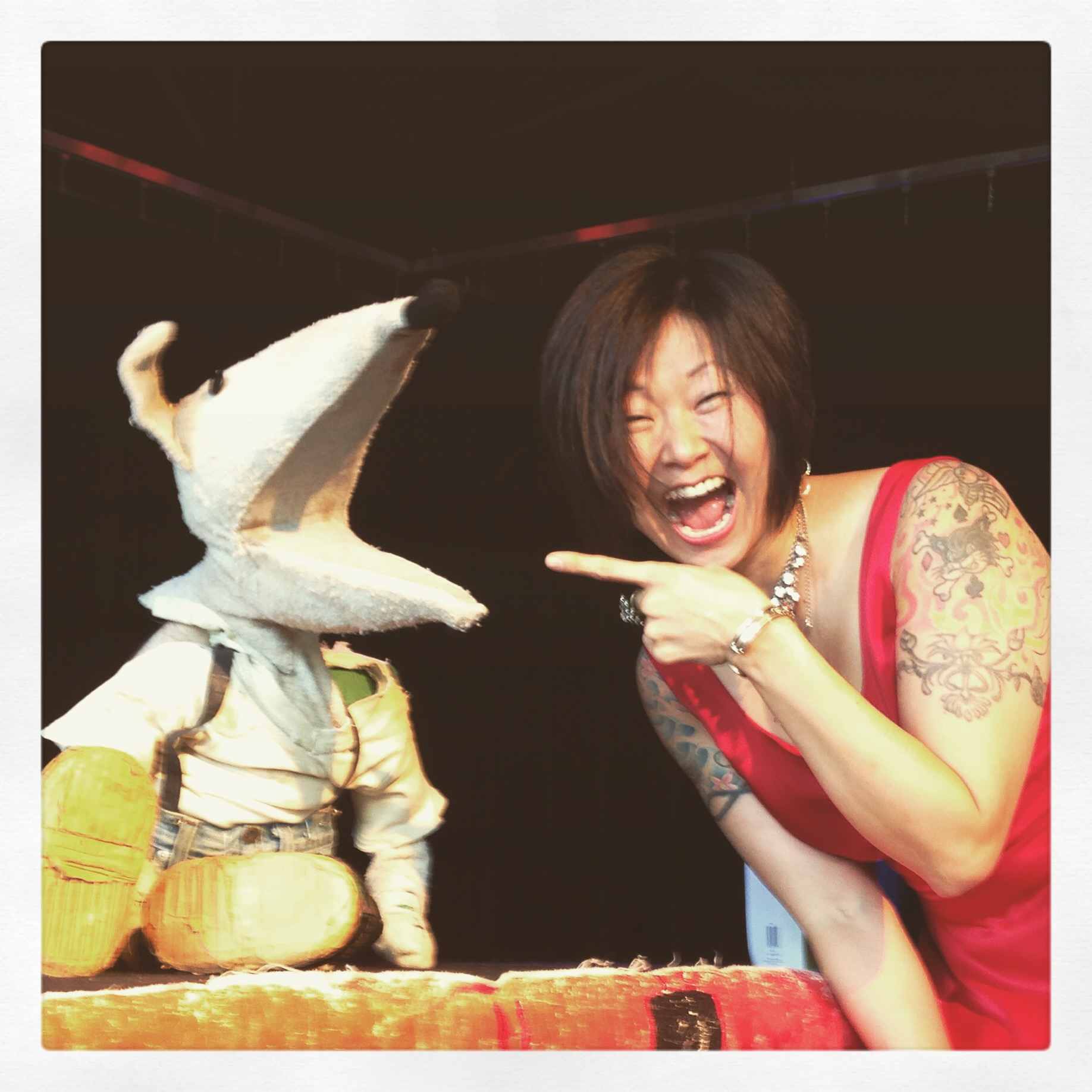
Mia Park and Ratso hosting Chic-A-Go-Go

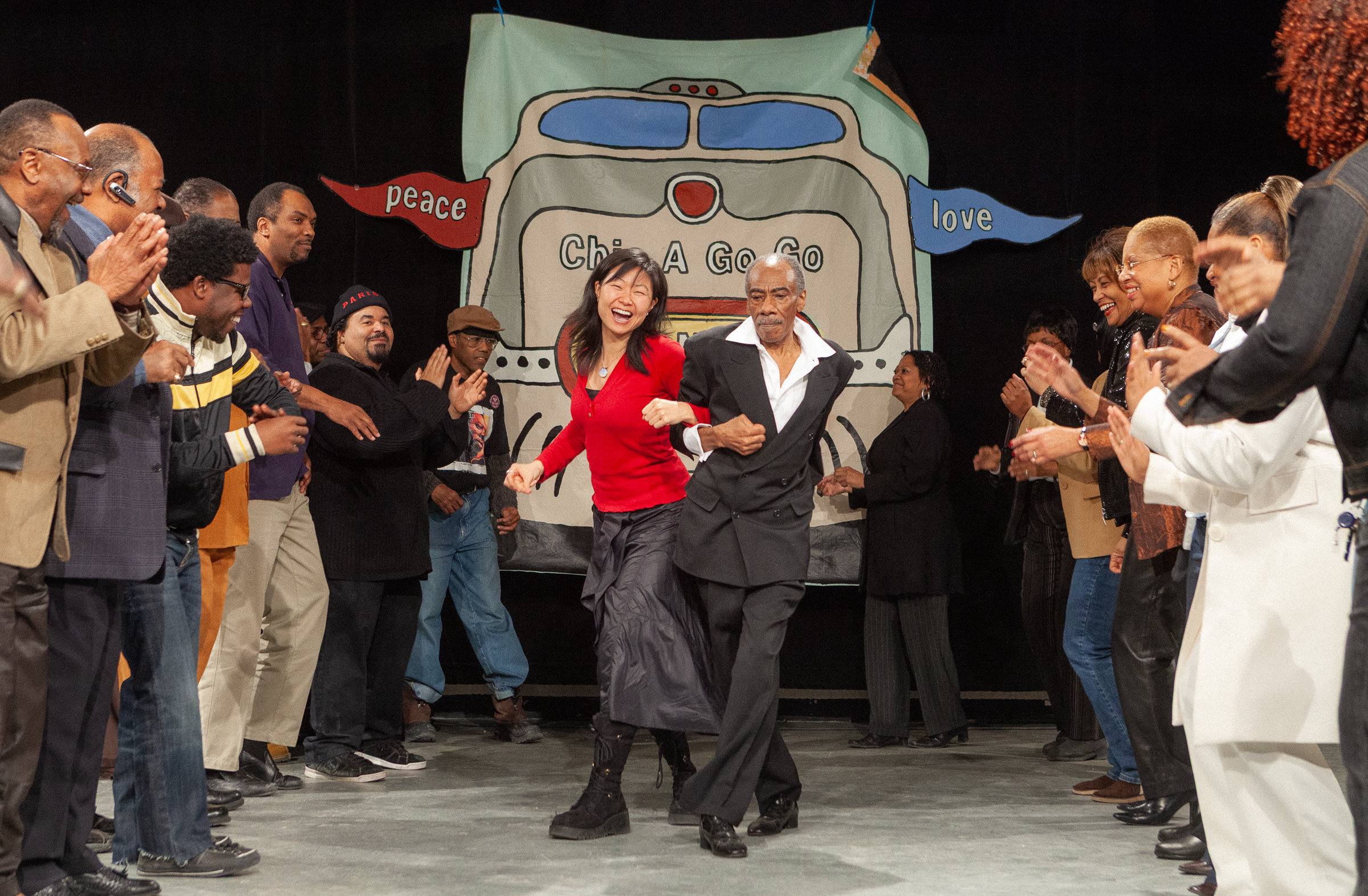
Mia Park with dancers on the set of Chic-A-Go-Go on January 30th, 2009. Photo by Jim Newberry.

The show invites members of the public to participate in tapings at CAN-TV studios. A typical episode features dancing to prerecorded music, as well as musical guests lip syncing to their own songs. Each show is hosted by Jake Austen, who portrays Ratso, a teenage puppet rat, and Mia Park as human sidekick Miss Mia.

Among the show's regular features are the "El Train Line" (based on Soul Train's "Soul Train Line"), the "Fantasy Dance" (which features dancers in front of a green screen), and videotaped interviews with guests.

== History and influences ==
Austen got the idea for the show when he published a story in his magazine Roctober about Kiddie-a-Go-Go, an all-kids dance show produced in Chicago between 1963 and 1970. Austen and Stewart met the show's creators, Jack and Elaine Mulqueen, and were inspired to complete a certification course that would allow them to use the facilities of Chicago Access Corporation. They shot the first episodes of the show in March 1996.

In addition to Kiddie-a-Go-Go, the show is influenced by well-known dance shows such as Soul Train, American Bandstand, and Solid Gold.

In the 2004 movie The Big Bounce, Morgan Freeman's character is seen watching the show.

== See also ==
- Soul Train
- American Bandstand
- Solid Gold
- Pancake Mountain
- Yo Gabba Gabba!
